= Dwyer (name) =

Dwyer is an Irish surname which is a slightly anglicised variation of O'Dwyer. It is said that people with the surname Dwyer and who come from Ireland all come from the same clan.

== Surname ==
=== Arts and entertainment ===
- Alice Dwyer (born 1988), German actress
- Allys Dwyer, American actress and educator
- Audrey Dwyer, Canadian actor and playwright
- Benjamin Dwyer (born 1965), Irish classical guitarist and composer
- Bil Dwyer (1907–1987), American cartoonist and humorist
- Bil Dwyer (born 1962), American comedian and game-show host
- Doriot Anthony Dwyer (1922–2020), American flautist
- Finbarr Dwyer (1946–2014), Irish Irish accordion player and composer
- Hilary Dwyer (1945–2020), English actress
- Jim Dwyer (journalist) (1957–2020), American journalist
- John Dwyer (musician), American musician
- John M. Dwyer (1935–2018), American set decorator
- Karyn Dwyer (1975–2018), Canadian actress
- Kieron Dwyer (born 1967), American comic book artist and penciller
- Leslie Dwyer (1906–1986), English actor
- Marc Dwyer (born 1987), Australian radio presenter and actor
- Michael Dwyer (journalist) (1951–2010), Irish journalist and film critic
- Mary Alice Dwyer-Dobbin, American television producer
- PK Dwyer (born 1992), American musician
- Penny Dwyer (1953–2003), British comedy writer and performer
- Phil Dwyer (musician) (born 1965), Canadian musician
- Terri Dwyer (born 1973), English actress
- Virginia Dwyer, American actress

=== Military ===
- John Dwyer (soldier) (1890–1962), Australian recipient of the Victoria Cross
- Edward Dwyer (1895–1916), English recipient of the Victoria Cross
- Joseph Patrick Dwyer (1976–2008), American soldier
- Michael Dwyer (1772–1825), Irish soldier and insurgent
- Ross T. Dwyer (1919–2001), American general

=== Politics ===
- Bernard J. Dwyer (1921–1998), American politician
- Don H. Dwyer Jr. (born 1958), American politician
- Florence P. Dwyer (1902–1976), American politician
- James Dwyer (politician) (1881–1932), Irish politician
- James J. Dwyer, American politician
- Jeremy Dwyer (1947–2005), Mayor of Hastings, New Zealand
- Kate Dwyer (1861–1949), Australian educator, suffragist, and labour activist
- John Dwyer (Australian judge) (1879–1966), Australian politician
- Michael Dwyer (Canadian politician) (1879–1953), Canadian politician
- Philip Dwyer (born c. 1967), Irish far-right anti-immigration activist
- R. Budd Dwyer (1939–1987), American politician
- Séamus Dwyer (1886–1922), Irish politician
- Ubi Dwyer (1933–2001), Irish anarchist
- Walter Dwyer (1875–1950), Australian politician and judge
- William Dwyer (Irish politician) (1887–1951), Irish politician

=== Science and academia ===
- Angela Dwyer, Australian social scientist and academic
- Dominic Dwyer, Australian microbiologist and clinical professor of medicine
- Francis Patrick Dwyer (1910–1962), Australian chemist
- John Dwyer (medicine) (born 1939), Australian professor of medicine and public health advocate
- Joseph Dwyer (physicist) (born 1963), American physicist
- Peter Dwyer, Australian anthropologist
- Rocky Dwyer, Canadian business scholar
- William Gerard Dwyer (born 1947), American mathematician

=== Sport ===
- Alan Dwyer (born 1952), English association footballer
- Anthony Dwyer (born 1970), Australian rules footballer
- Bernard Dwyer (born 1967), English rugby league footballer
- Bob Dwyer (born 1940), Australian rugby union coach
- Bridget Dwyer (born 1980), American golfer
- Chappie Dwyer (1894–1975), Australian cricketer
- Chris Dwyer (born 1988), American baseball player
- Dom Dwyer, English-born American association football (soccer) player
- E. B. Dwyer (1876–1912), Australian cricketer
- Frank Dwyer (1868–1943), American baseball player
- Gordie Dwyer (born 1978), Canadian ice hockey player
- Jack Dwyer (1927–1997), American football player
- Jamie Dwyer (born 1979), Australian field hockey player
- Jim Dwyer (baseball) (born 1950), American baseball player
- John Dwyer (baseball) (active 1882), American baseball player
- John Dwyer (field hockey) (1928–2026), Australian field hockey player
- Jonathan Dwyer (born 1989), American football player
- Larry Dwyer (1884–1964), Australian rugby union player
- Laura Dwyer (born 1977), American wheelchair curler
- Laurie Dwyer (1938–2016), Australian rules footballer
- Mark Dwyer (born 1964), Australian rules footballer
- Martin Dwyer (born 1975), English jockey
- Matthew Dwyer (born 1959), Irish cricketer
- Michael F. Dwyer (1847–1906), American racehorse owner
- Mick Dwyer (born 1968), Australian rules footballer
- Mike Dwyer (ice hockey) (born 1957), Canadian ice hockey player
- Nate Dwyer (born 1978), American football player
- Noel Dwyer (1934–1993), Irish footballer
- Pat Dwyer (hurler), Irish hurler
- Patrick Dwyer (sprinter) (born 1977), Australian sprinter
- Patrick Dwyer (ice hockey) (born 1983), American ice hockey player
- Phil Dwyer (1953–2021), Welsh footballer
- Philip J. Dwyer (1844–1917), American racehorse owner
- Simon Dwyer (born 1989), Australian rugby league footballer
- Tommy Dwyer (hurler), Irish hurler
- Wayne Dwyer, New Zealand rugby league player

=== Other fields ===
- Bill Dwyer (mobster) (1883–1946), American gangster and bootlegger
- Dermod Dwyer, Irish chief executive
- George Dwyer (1908–1987), English Roman Catholic archbishop
- Sir Joe Dwyer (1939–2021), British civil engineer and businessman

- Kevin Dwyer (disambiguation), multiple people
- Michael Martin Dwyer (1984–2009), Irish security guard
- Michael Middleton Dwyer, American architect
- Robert Joseph Dwyer (1908–1976), American Roman Catholic archbishop
- William Lee Dwyer (1929–2002), American judge

=== Hyphenated ===
- Mary Alice Dwyer-Dobbin, American television producer
- Edmund Dwyer-Gray (1870–1945), Australian politician

== Given name ==
- Robert Dwyer Joyce
- Ada Dwyer Russell

== See also ==
- Dwyer (disambiguation)
- O'Dwyer (surname)
- Dwyre
