= Lismakeeve =

Townland in County Tipperary, Ireland

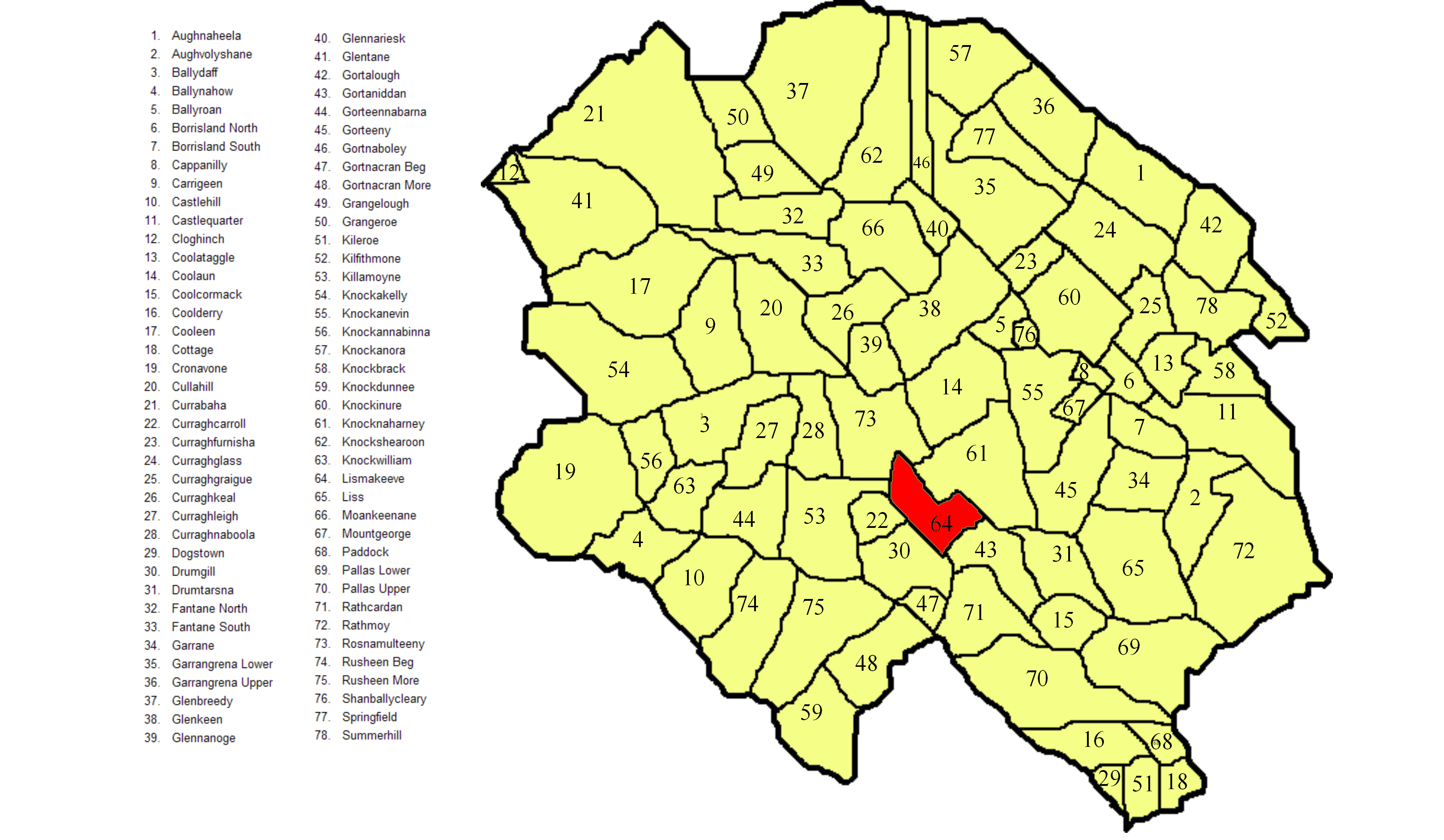
Location of the townland within the civil parish of Glenkeen and the ecclesiastical parish of Borrisoleigh and Ileigh

Lismakeeve is a townland in the civil parish of Glenkeen in County Tipperary, Ireland.

It contains the hamlet of Ileigh, the location of a Catholic church, which lends its name to that of the encompassing ecclesiastical parish of Borrisoleigh and Ileigh, this ecclesiastical parish being unusual in that it is co-extensive with the civil parish.
