= Glenkeen (disambiguation) =

Glenkeen is a civil parish in County Tipperary.

Glenkeen may also refer to:

- Glenkeen (townland), one of the 78 townlands in the above parish
- Glenkeen, County Fermanagh, a townland in Northern Ireland, see List of townlands of County Fermanagh
- Glenkeen, County Londonderry, a townland in Northern Ireland, see Aghadowey civil parish
- Glenkeen, County Tyrone, a townland in County Tyrone, Northern Ireland, see Aghaloo
