= O'Dwyer =

O'Dwyer or O'Dwyers may refer to:

House of (Clan) O'Dwyer

== People ==
- O'Dwyer (surname)
- O'Dwyers of Kilnamanagh
- William O'Dwyer, 100th mayor of New York City (1946–1950)
- Sinéad O'Dwyer (born 1983), Irish fashion designer

== Other ==
- J. R. O'Dwyer Company, magazine publisher for the United States public relations industry
- O'Dwyers GAA, a Gaelic Athletic Association club based at Hamlet Lane, Balbriggan, County Dublin, Ireland
- O'Dwyer VLe, handgun – see List of caseless firearms

== See also ==
- Dwyer (disambiguation)
- Dwyre
