= R-500 =

R-500 may refer to:

- A military version of the Warner Scarab aircraft engine
- A missile for the Russian Iskander-K (9M728) missile system

== See also ==
- R500 (disambiguation), including roads
