= Gleeson Group =

Beverage Manufacturer

Gleeson Group was a manufacturer and distributor of packaged beverage and confectionery products, established in 1974, and owned by the Cooney family. It has approximately 650 employees. The company has national coverage through its 13 distribution hubs. It also owns a large manufacturing plant located in Borrisoleigh, County Tipperary.

== History ==
The company was established in the late 1960s, by the Gleeson family, in Borrisoleigh, County Tipperary. It was primarily a manufacturer of soft drinks, and a bottler of stout. The company was sold to brothers Nicholas and Patrick Cooney in 1974. The company's first major expansion was its first Dublin depot, which was opened in 1976. The company gradually grew, acquiring wholesale companies across Ireland.

The company's biggest acquisition was the buy-out of United Beverages' business outside Dublin, from Diageo in 2005. The company did further business with Diageo in August 2010, when they acquired the Gilbey's Wines business from them.

In 2012, C&C Group purchased Gleeson Wholesale from Pat Cooney

== Brands ==
The following list shows the notable brands that Gleeson Group distributed:

- Tipperary Natural Mineral Water
- Bavaria - Dutch Lager.
- Duvel
- Maredsous
- Vedett
- Menabrea
- Weihenstephaner
