= R498 road (Ireland) =

Road in County Tipperary, Ireland

R498 road
- Bóthar R498
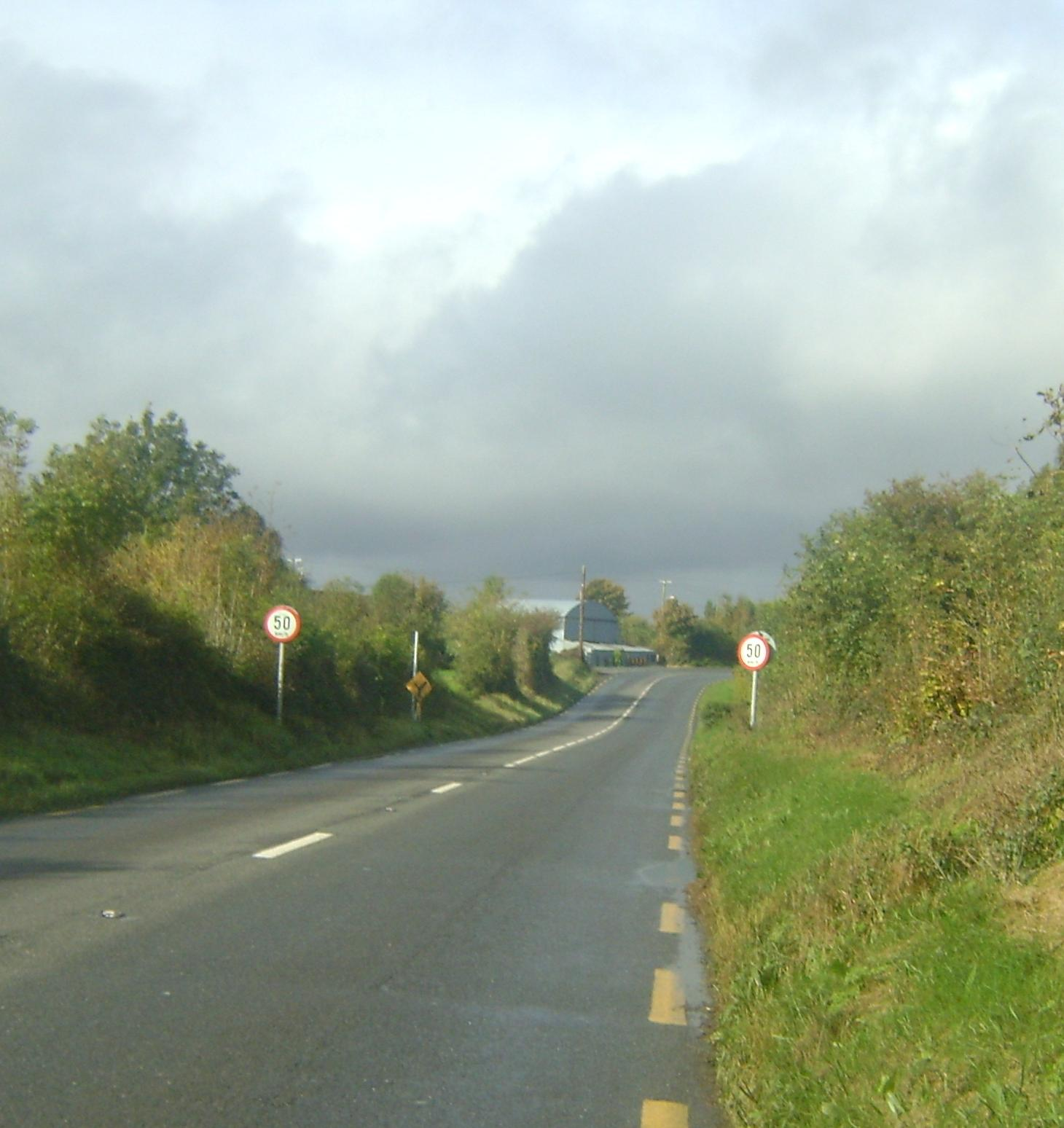
- R498 at Bouladuff

Route information
- Length: 37 km (23 mi)

Location
- Country: Ireland
- Primary destinations: County Tipperary; Nenagh - Starts in town centre (R497); Bridge over Limerick–Ballybrophy railway line; Crosses the Nenagh River; Passes under the M7; R499; Borrisoleigh - R501; Bouladuff.; R503; Terminates at the N62 road Liberty Square Thurles

Highway system
- Roads in Ireland; Motorways; Primary; Secondary; Regional

The R498 is a regional road in County Tipperary linking Nenagh, via Borrisoleigh and Bouladuff to Thurles. The road is approximately 37 km (23 mi) long.

== R498–N62 Link Road ==
During 2011, a road to link the N62 with the R498 was built. Taking a small portion of the L4121 local road near Tipperary Institute, the road was already widened and turned off into a new road going over the main Dublin–Cork line with a new bridge to be constructed and joining the N62 at Gortataggart. This new stretch of road is currently part of the R498, as designated by Transport Infrastructure Ireland in 2012. North Tipperary County Council was in charge of its construction.

== Thurles Bypass ==
Plans for a Bypass to connect the N62 North (before Thurles) N75 and R498 with N62 South (pass Thurles) have been approved and are currently in route selection, it is more than likely the R498–N62 link road will be part of the new bypass.

== See also ==
- Roads in Ireland - (Primary National Roads)
- Secondary Roads
