= R500 road =

R500 road may refer to:

- R500 road (Ireland)
- R500 road (South Africa)
