= Dwyer =

Dwyer may refer to:

== Places in the United States ==
- Dwyer, New Mexico
- Dwyer, Wyoming

== Other uses ==
- Dwyer (name), a surname
- Dwyer Arena
- Dwyer Hill Road
- Dwyer Brothers Stable
- Dwyer Stadium
- Dwyer Stakes
- Monsignor Paul Dwyer Catholic High School
- William T. Dwyer High School

== See also ==
- Dwyre
- O'Dwyer (disambiguation)
