= Curreeny =

Townland in County Tipperary, Ireland

Coordinates: 52°44′N 8°09′W

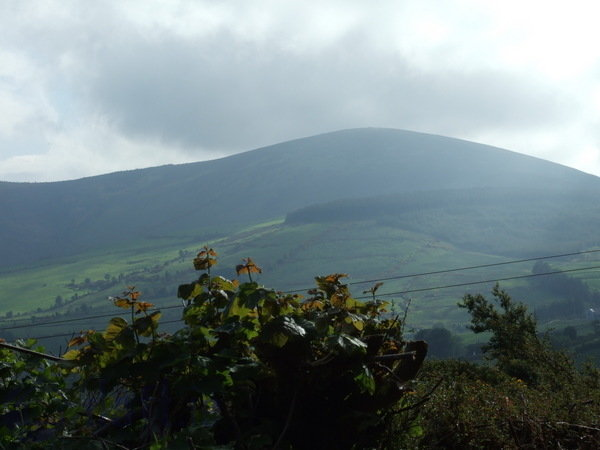
A view of Mauherslieve

Curreeny (Irish: Na Coirríní) is a townland in North County Tipperary, Ireland. It is situated 16 km (10 mi) from Nenagh, in the Roman Catholic parish of Templederry. Curreeny is on the R497 regional road, which is the main road from Nenagh to Tipperary Town. Curreeny is near Dolla, Templederry and Kilcommon villages and within reasonable driving distance from Limerick city, Nenagh, Thurles, Templemore, Tipperary town, Newport and Cashel.

Curreeny is a rural area located within the Silvermine Mountains, at the foot of Mauherslieve or Mother Mountain. Much of the terrain is hilly and is covered in evergreen forestry. The origin of the name Curreeny is The little pointed hills. Curreeny is approximately 1,000 ft (300 m) above sea level. Mauherslieve Bog is to the west of the townland.
