= John Grace (hurler) =

Irish hurler

Personal information
- Born: 1957 (age 68–69) Dolla, County Tipperary, Ireland

Sport
- Sport: Hurling
- Position: Midfield
Club
- Years: Club
- Silvermines
Club titles
- Tipperary titles: 0
Inter-county*
Years	County	Apps (scores)
1979-1984	Tipperary	3 (0-00)
Inter-county titles
- Munster titles: 0
- All-Irelands: 0
- NHL: 1
- All Stars: 0
- *Inter County team apps and scores correct as of 21:45, 28 August 2021.

John Grace (born 1957) is an Irish former hurler. At club level he played with Silvermines and was also a member of the Tipperary senior hurling team. He usually lined out at midfield.

== Career ==
Grace first came to prominence at juvenile and underage levels with the Silvermines club in Dolla. He was just 17-years-old when he lined out with the club's senior team that won the North Tipperary Championship title in 1974. Grace's performances for the club brought him to the attention of the Tipperary minor team selectors. After two years in that grade he preogressed onto the under-21 team and won a Munster Under-21 Championship title in 1978. Grace lined out with the Tipperary senior hurling team at various times between 1979 and 1984.

== Honours ==
Silvermines

- North Tipperary Senior Hurling Championship: 1974

Tipperary

- National Hurling League: 1978-79
- Munster Under-21 Hurling Championship: 1978
