= R504 road =

R504 road may refer to:

- R504 road (Ireland)
- R504 road (South Africa)
- R504 Kolyma Highway
