= Sean Mackey =

Sean Mackey may refer to:

- Sean Mackey (civil engineer)
- Sean Mackey (physician)
