= Edmund O'Dwyer =

Irish landowner and soldier

Edmund O'Dwyer (died 25 August 1654). also spelt O'Dwyre, was an Irish landowner and officer of the Confederate Irish forces in the Irish Confederate Wars, playing the leading role in Munster in the fight against the Cromwellian conquest of Ireland.

== Background ==
Clan O'Dwyer dates from the days of Brian Boru in the 10th century. The last clan chief was Philip O'Dwyer of Kilnamanagh, who died in 1648. A landowner in the barony of Clanwilliam, Edmund O'Dwyer is believed to have been a cousin of Philip O'Dwyer, whose brother Donogh was one of Edmund O'Dwyer's colonels at the time of the fight against Cromwell. In The O'Dwyers of Kilnamanagh (1933), Sir Michael O'Dwyer describes Edmund O'Dwyer as "a near kinsman".

== Career ==
In 1640, O'Dwyer was listed among the cavalry raised by the Marquess of Ormond for King Charles I's war against the Scots Covenanters. In 1647, he fought for the Confederates at the Battle of Dungan's Hill, after which he was captured and held as a prisoner at Dublin Castle. He was still there in 1648, a longer captivity than foreseen.

O'Dwyer was appointed to command the Irish Confederate forces in County Tipperary and County Waterford when Oliver Cromwell landed in Ireland in August 1649. In March 1650, Cromwell was able to capture both strongholds of the O'Dwyers, Dundrum, County Tipperary, and Ballagh, and O'Dwyer's brigade then took to the mountains and woods and carried on the fight, raiding and harassing the English.

In 1651, O'Dwyer came to an agreement with the New Model Army's Colonel Jerome Sankey about an exchange of prisoners, and Sankey praised O'Dwyer for the "punctuall performance of his word on all ingagements". He also reported that O'Dwyer had shown a "very honest and friendly demeanour" to the English officers who had been his prisoners.

At the end of 1651, O'Dwyer had five regiments and some 2,700 men. He led one infantry and one cavalry regiment himself, while three others of foot were commanded by Donogh O'Dwyer, a Colonel White, and a Colonel O'Meagher.

On 23 March 1652, at Cahir Castle, O'Dwyer agreed a treaty of surrender with Sankey. His men, but not his officers, were to deliver their arms and horses to Sankey at Cashel two weeks later. They would have the liberty to live where the English allowed, payment for their arms, some pay, and the leave to go overseas to fight as mercenaries, although not against the Commonwealth of England. The Articles of Agreement between them were read out in the English parliament on 8 April 1652. However, Donogh O'Dwyer was then arrested for his part in the Cashel massacre of 1641 and in November 1652 was executed in Cashel.

O'Dwyer's estates were confiscated, leaving him with no income. By the middle of October, he and his brigade were on the European mainland. In October 1653, O'Dwyer had the permission of the English to ship another 3,500 Irishmen to the County of Flanders to fight for the Prince of Condé.

On 25 August 1654, O'Dwyer was killed in the storming of Arras, together with his brother officers in arms Piarus Butler and James FitzGerald.

== In fiction ==
Edmund O'Dwyer features as a character in the novel Rebel's Knot (2022) by Cryssa Bazos, set amid the historical events of Cromwell's invasion.
