= R503 road =

R503 road may refer to:

- R503 road (Ireland)
- R503 road (South Africa)
