= R501 road =

R501 road may refer to:

- R501 road (Ireland)
- R501 road (South Africa)
