= Gwyer =

Gwyer is a surname. Notable people with the surname include:

- Barbara Gwyer (1881–1974), British academic administrator
- Herbert Gwyer (died 1960), British Anglican bishop in Southern Africa
- Maurice Gwyer (1878–1952), British lawyer, judge, and academic administrator

== See also ==
- Dwyer (name)
