= Kilnamanagh Lower =

Barony in County Tipperary, Ireland

Kilnamanagh Lower (Irish: Cill na Manach Íochtarach) is a barony in County Tipperary, Ireland. This geographical unit of land is one of 12 baronies in County Tipperary. Its chief town is Dundrum. The barony lies between Kilnamanagh Upper to the north (whose chief town is Borrisoleigh), Clanwilliam to the south (whose chief town is Cahir) and Eliogarty to the east (whose chief town is Thurles). It is currently administered by Tipperary County Council.

== Legal context ==
Baronies were created after the Norman invasion of Ireland as divisions of counties and were used for the administration of justice and the raising of revenue. While baronies continue to be officially defined units, they have been administratively obsolete since 1898. However, they continue to be used in land registration and in specification, such as in planning permissions. In many cases, a barony corresponds to an earlier Gaelic túath which had submitted to the Crown.

Kilnamanagh was controlled by the O'Dwyer clan in the 16th century. They adopted English-law property ownership from 1607.

== Modern times ==
When County Tipperary was split into North and South Ridings in 1836, the barony of Kilnamanagh was split into two half-baronies. Kilnamanagh Upper was allocated to the north riding with Kilnamanagh Lower being allocated to the south riding.

== Towns, villages and townlands of the barony ==
Annacarty, Ballintemple, Cappawhite, Donohill, Dundrum, Goold's Cross, Hollyford, Kilmore, Rathkennan, Rossmore.

=== Civil parishes of the barony ===
This table lists a historical-geographical sub-division of the barony known as the civil parish (not to be confused with an Ecclesiastical parish).

Name in Irish	Name in English
Áth Cró	Aghacrew
Baile an Teampaill	Ballintemple
An Chill Mhór	Kilmore
Cill Phádraig	Kilpatrick
An Clochar	Clogher
Cluain Abhla	Clonoulty
Dún Eochaille	Donohill
Ráth Cianáin	Rathkennan
Uachtar Liag	Oughterleague

== See also ==
- List of civil parishes of South Tipperary
