= Rearcross =

Village in County Tipperary, Ireland

Rearcross Crois na Rae
- Village
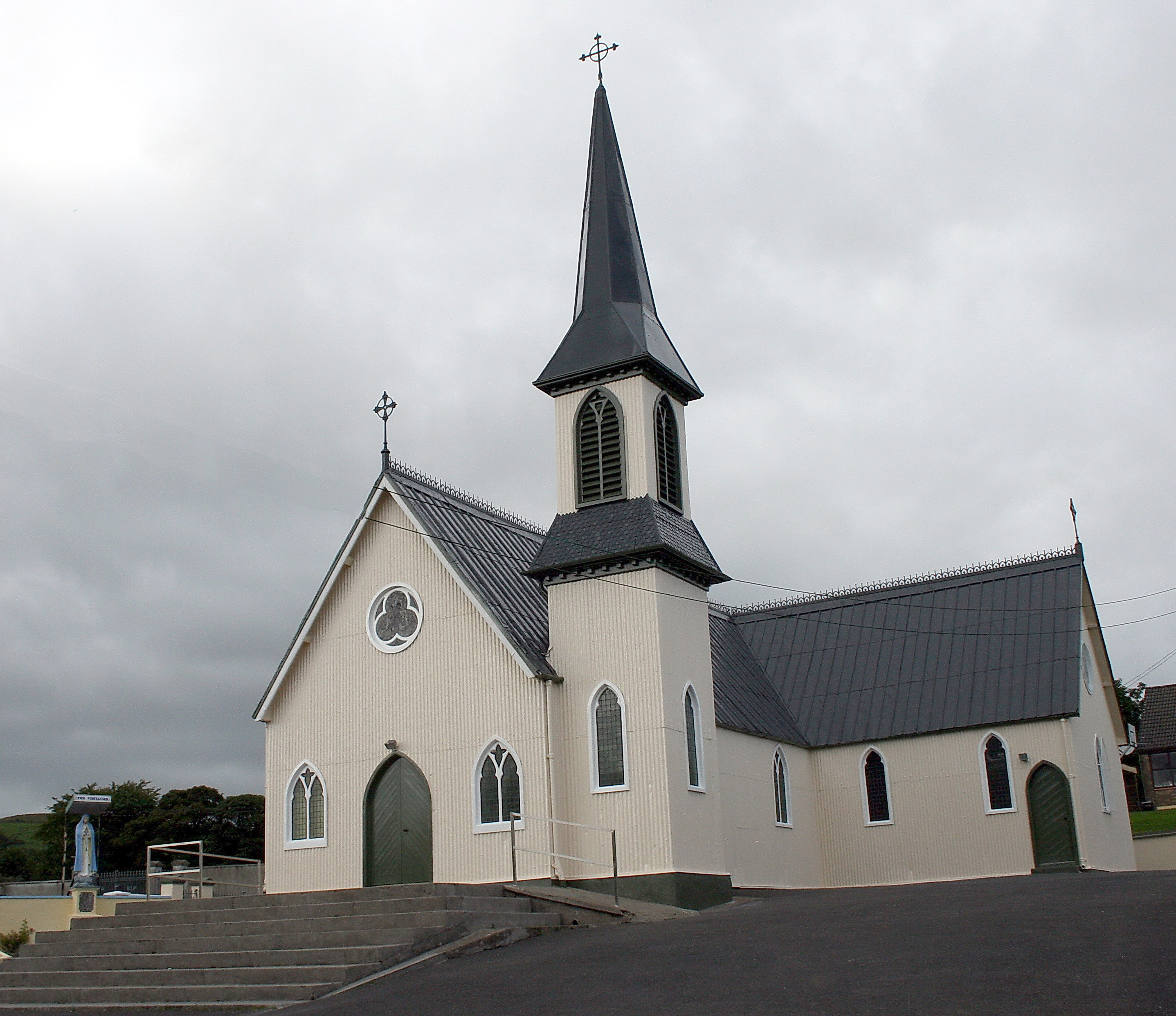
- Church in Rearcross

- Location in Ireland
- Coordinates: 52°41′10″N 8°14′12″W
- Country: Ireland
- Province: Munster
- County: County Tipperary
- Time zone: UTC+0 (WET)
  - Summer (DST): UTC-1 (IST (WEST))

Rearcross or Rear Cross (Irish: Crois na Rae) is a village in the townland of Reardnogy in County Tipperary, Ireland. It is in the Slieve Felim Mountains, 25 km east of Limerick on the R503 Thurles to Limerick road. The village is in the Roman Catholic parish of Kilcommon and Hollyford and Rearcross, in the Archdiocese of Cashel and Emly, and also in the historical barony of Owney and Arra.

== Rearcross Church ==
Rearcross Church was designed by a Swiss architect for a Wesleyan congregation. It was a temporary structure situated in Northumbria and used by the mining community there. During the 1880s the community at Rearcross had to walk quite a distance to hear mass in the absence of a local church. At the time, diocesan funds were heavily committed to finishing the cathedral in Thurles and with resources stretched the bishop dispatched the local priests on fund-raising drives to America. The parish priest in Rearcross, Fr. William J. McKeogh, on one such expedition succeeded in raising the sum of £4,400 in America while other priests returned with less.

In the meantime, Fr. McKeogh somehow heard of the church in Northumbria, where the mining industry was going into decline. In 1887 he arranged to buy the church for £440, had it dismantled, imported to Limerick and transported by the local farmers of Rearcross to its present location. The site was donated by the Hogan family. The steps were built at the expense of the landlord, Lord Barrington, by his workmen from Glenstal Abbey. The church is unique, having corrugated tin walls (the iron having been used during the Second World War) and roof, three galleries, a stained glass rose window in each gable and representations of two saints not usually the objects of Irish devotion - St. Thomas Aquinas and St. William. The names coincide with the first names of the priest donors. The church was renovated at the cost of €90,000 c. 2000.

== People ==
- Austin Flannery, priest

== See also ==
- Other tin churches in Ireland
- List of towns and villages in Ireland
