= Nick Cooney (sport shooter) =

Irish sports shooter

Personal information
- Nationality: Irish
- Born: 23 July 1934
- Died: 2 March 1999 (aged 64)

Sport
- Sport: Sports shooting

Nick Cooney (23 July 1934 – 2 March 1999) was an Irish sports shooter. He competed in the mixed skeet event at the 1980 Summer Olympics. In 1986, he and his brother founded the Tipperary Natural Mineral Water company.
