= Metal Storm =

Research and development company based in Australia

Metal Storm Limited
- Type: Public
- Industry: Defence
- Founded: 1994; 32 years ago
- Defunct: 2012; 14 years ago
- Fate: Voluntary administration
- Headquarters: Brisbane, Australia
- Key people: Terence James O'Dwyer, chairman
- Website: defendtex.com

Metal Storm Limited was a research and development company based in Brisbane, Australia, that specialized in electronically initiated superposed load weapons technology and owned the proprietary rights to the electronic ballistics technology invented by J. Mike O'Dwyer. The Metal Storm name applied to both the company and technology. The company had been placed into voluntary administration by 2012.

== Technology ==
Metal Storm used the concept of superposed load: multiple projectiles loaded nose to tail in a single gun barrel with propellant packed between them. The Roman candle, a traditional firework design, employs the same basic concept; however, the propellant continues to burn in the Roman candle's barrel, igniting the charge behind the subsequent projectile. The process is repeated by each charge in turn, ensuring that all projectiles in the barrel are discharged sequentially from the single ignition. Various methods of separately firing each propellant package behind stacked projectiles have been proposed which would allow a "shoot on demand" capability more suitable to firearms.

The concept of superposed loads was first applied to firearms in 1558 by the Italian inventor Giambattista della Porta. The experimental Chambers gun, created in the 1790s in Pennsylvania, was a seven-barrel tripod-mounted volley gun firing superposed loads in a similar manner to the Metal Storm gun, but neither superposed small arms nor mounted guns saw any real military use due to their expense and impracticality.

By the early 1990s, Mike O'Dwyer, an Australian inventor, observed that these methods did not eliminate the problem of unintended propellant ignition caused by highly pressurized hot gases "leaking" past the remaining projectiles in the barrel (blow-by) and igniting their charges. O'Dwyer's original Metal Storm patents demonstrated a method whereby projectiles placed in series along the length of a barrel could be fired sequentially and selectively without the danger associated with unintended propellant ignition.

In the original Metal Storm patents, the propellant immediately behind the projectile closest to the muzzle of the gun barrel was ignited by an electronically fired primer, the projectile was set in motion, and at the same time a reactive force acted on the remaining stacked projectiles in the barrel, pushing them backwards. By design, the remaining projectiles would distort under this load, expanding radially against the gun barrel wall. This created a seal (obturation), which prevented the hot propellant gases (expanding behind the lead projectile) from leaking past them and prematurely igniting the remaining propellant charges in the barrel. As each of these propellant charges was selectively (electronically) ignited, the force "unlocked" the projectile in front and propelled it down the gun barrel, and reinforced the radial expansion (and hence the seal) between the projectiles remaining in the barrel and the barrel wall.

Subsequent designs discarded the "distorting shell sealing against the barrel" concept in favour of containing the propellant in "skirts" that form the rear part of each projectile. These skirted projectiles differ from conventional shells and cartridge units in that the skirts are part of the projectile, and in that the skirts are open-ended (at the rear). The rearward seal to the skirt is provided by the nose of the following projectile in the barrel. As in the previous design, the firing of a projectile results in a rearward impulse on the remaining projectiles stacked in the barrel. This results in the skirts of the remaining shells in the barrel being compressed against the following shell heads, effectively creating a seal that prevents hot gases in the barrel triggering unintended propellant ignition ("blow-by") along the length of the barrel. Metal Storm also introduced inductive electronic ignition of the propellant, effectively from outside the barrel.

== Products ==
The Multi-shot Accessory Under-barrel Launcher (MAUL) is an electronically fired, 12-gauge shotgun for use as an accessory weapon to a range of weapons, such as the M4 or M16 rifle, or as a stand-alone 5 shot weapon, providing a range of lethal (buckshot and slug) and non-lethal (blunt impact, door breaching, and frangible) munitions, all preloaded in 5 round "stacked projectiles" munition tubes. Metal Storm reported the first shoulder-firing of the MAUL during tests on 24 April 2009 at its test facilities in Chantilly, Virginia.

Metal Storm has created a 36-barreled stacked projectile volley gun, boasting the highest rate of fire in the world. The prototype array demonstrated a firing rate of just over 1 million rounds per minute for a 180-round burst of 0.01 seconds (~27,777 rpm / barrel). Firing within 0.1 seconds from up to 1600 barrels (at maximum configuration) the gun claimed a maximum rate of fire of 1.62 million RPM and creating a dense wall (0.1 m between follow-up projectiles) of 24,000 projectiles.

The 3GL is a semi-automatic grenade launcher firing individually loaded grenades, with up to three rounds being able to be loaded and fired semi-automatically. It can be attached to weapons via RIS rails or to a stand-alone folding stock.

A minigun with a belt of separate firing chambers also exists.

== History ==
The first 36-barrel prototype was unveiled in June 1997. The Chinese government offered Metal Storm US$100M in 2000 to develop the technology in China. O'Dwyer refused the offer, and informed the Australian Department of Defence, leading to a discussion the Department confirmed occurred, but refused to comment on its substance. Nonetheless, the concept behind the weapon system generated some interest in China such that research was carried out to investigate the utility of such a weapon for use onboard naval vessels and armoured vehicles, in the latter case even for the purpose of intercepting incoming anti-tank guided missiles.

In June 2003, Metal Storm entered into an agreement to provide technology to Thunderstorm Firefighting Pty Ltd to help develop a civilian application of its technology to help with bushfire fighting activities. On 27 June 2003, Metal Storm received funding from the American military.

In 2005, O'Dwyer left the company with a $500,000 payout and an intention to sell half his stake - then valued at $43m - but he could not find a buyer.

On 19 November 2007, it was announced that the US Navy was buying Metal Storm grenade "barrels".

In August 2010, Metal Storm signed a contract with a value of US$3,365,000 with Papua New Guinea's Correctional Services Minister Tony Aimo to supply 500 MAULs and 10,000 less-lethal barrels for use by correctional services officers.

Metal Storm was placed into voluntary administration on 26 July 2012. In late 2015, DefendTex, an Australian-based defence R&D company, acquired the intellectual property, trademarks and other assets of Metal Storm with a view to the continued development and commercialisation of the technology, however Metal Storm was not mentioned on the DefendTex website as of 2026.

== See also ==
- Advanced Individual Combat Weapon
- Close-in weapon system
- List of modern armament manufacturers
- List of multiple-barrel firearms
- Ribauldequin
