= Kilnamanagh Upper =

Barony in County Tipperary, Ireland

Kilnamanagh Upper (Irish: Cill na Manach Uachtarach) is a barony in County Tipperary, Ireland. This geographical unit of land is one of 12 baronies in County Tipperary. Its chief town is Borrisoleigh. The barony lies between Ormond Upper to the north (whose chief town is Toomevara), Kilnamanagh Lower to the south (whose chief town is Dundrum) and Eliogarty to the east (whose chief town is Thurles). It is currently administered by Tipperary County Council.

== Legal context ==
Baronies were created after the Norman invasion of Ireland as divisions of counties and were used for the administration of justice and the raising of revenue. While baronies continue to be officially defined units, they have been administratively obsolete since 1898. However, they continue to be used in land registration and in specification, such as in planning permissions. In many cases, a barony corresponds to an earlier Gaelic túath which had submitted to the Crown.

== Modern times ==
When County Tipperary was split into North and South Ridings in 1836, the barony of Kilnamanagh was split into two half-baronies. Kilnamanagh Upper was allocated to the north riding with Kilnamanagh Lower being allocated to the south riding.

== Towns, villages and townlands of the barony ==
Borrisoleigh.

=== Civil parishes of the barony ===
This table lists a historical-geographical sub-division of the barony known as the civil parish (not to be confused with an Ecclesiastical parish).

Name in Irish	Name in English
Bealach Achaille	Ballycahill
Dún	Doon
Gleann Caoin	Glenkeen
Maigh Ailbhe	Moyaliff
An Teampall Beag	Templebeg
An Teampall Uachtarach	Upperchurch
Tuaim	Toem

== See also ==
- List of civil parishes of County Tipperary
