= Kevin Dwyer =

Kevin Dwyer may refer to:

- PK Dwyer, jump blues musician, sometimes credited as Kevin Dwyer
- Kevin Dwyer (cricketer) (1929–2020), New Zealand cricketer
- Kevin Dwyer (politician) (1913–1982), Australian politician
