= R500 =

R500 may refer to:

- R500 Series. Radeon X1000 Series video cards
- Superlight R500, a vehicle produced by Caterham Racing
- R500 road (South Africa)
- R500 road (Ireland)
- Mercedes-Benz R-Class R500, a car
