= Clan O'Dwyer =

Clan O'Dwyer (Ó Duibhir) Noble house
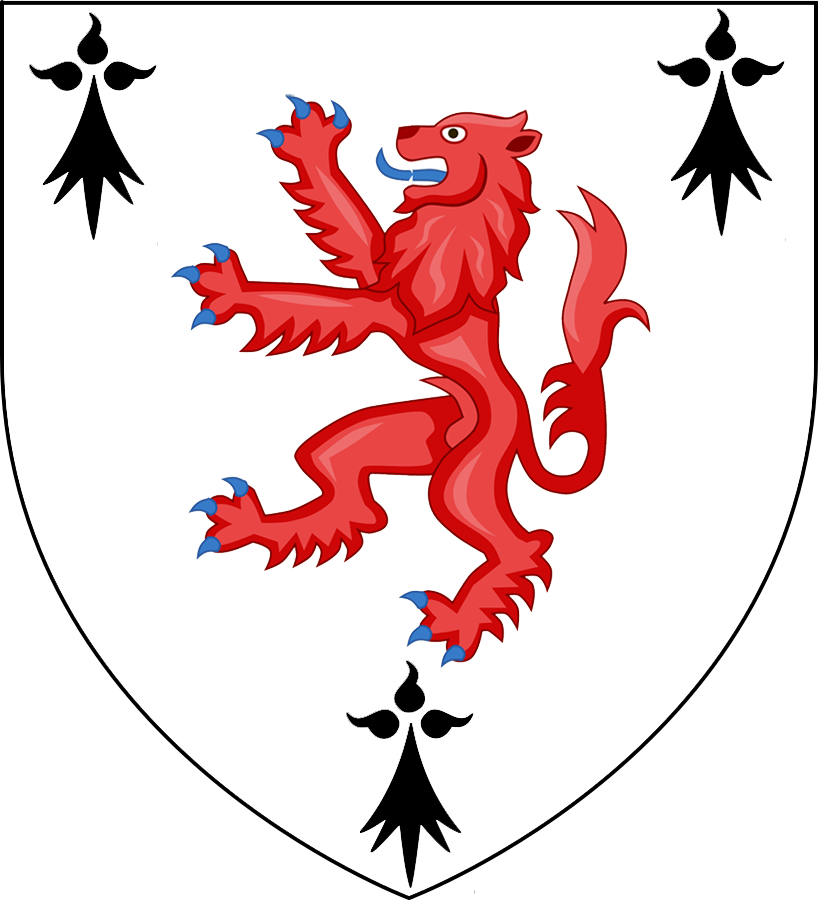
- Parent house: Laigin (Dál Cairbre)
- Country: Munster, Ormond & Leinster, Ulster (One Branch)
- Founded: c. 183 AD
- Founder: Dubhuir mac Spealáin
- Current head: By sept chief
- Titles: Lord of (Baron) Kilnamanagh; Lord of Clonyhorpa; Lord of Drumdromy; Baron de Thory (France); Graf (Count/Earl) O’Dwyer
- Motto: Virtus sola nobilitas : virtue alone enobles
- Estates: Dundrum house; Moyaliffe house (formerly); Killenure castle (formerly)
- Cadet branches: Lenihan, Hayden, O'Dwyer of Ulster

O'Dwyer (Irish: Ó Dubhuir), also known as Dwyer, Dyer is one of Ireland's oldest Gaelic noble or aristocratic houses, based most prominently in what is today County Tipperary. The name means "dark coloured", in reference to their progenitor Dubhuir mac Spealáin's hair colour.

== Ancestry ==
A claimed ancestor of the O'Dwyer clan was King Milesius of Spain, who according to legend conquered Ireland for the Gaels.

Documented paternal ancestors of the clan are of the Laigin, specifically, Cairbre Cluichechair, who was the son of Cú Corb, King of Leinster (himself the son of High King, Conchobar Abradruad). Cairbre Cluichechair moved into Munster, founding the Dál Cairbre Aradh at an early stage.

However, according to historian C. Thomas Cairney, the O'Dwyers were chiefs of the Dal Cairbre Arad tribe who in turn came from the Erainn who were the second wave of Celts to settle in Ireland between about 500 and 100 BC, which was before the Laigin who were the third wave of Celts to settle in Ireland.

== History ==
There are accounts of the O'Dwyer family participating in the Battle of Clontarf and Irish clan warfare.

The O'Dwyers eventually emerged as Lords of Kilnamanagh in the High to Late Middle Ages, but they are not referenced by name as significant in the Annals of the Four Masters until the 15th century.

Along with the O'Carroll of Éile, the O'Kennedy of Ormond and the Mulryan of Owney, the O'Dwyers of Kilnamanagh were one of a cluster of regional Gaelic clan powers in the High Middle Ages in the area of what would one day become County Tipperary who held out against Anglicisation with the arrival of the Lordship of Ireland. They interplayed with newer Norman arrivals on their borders who became significant powers, especially the Butler Earls of Ormond. Clan members Philip O'Dwyer and Anthony O'Dwyer captured the Rock of Cashel in 1641 during the Irish Rebellion of 1641. Subsequently, following the Cromwellian War in Ireland, the clan were punished and dispossessed of much of their land under the Act for the Settlement of Ireland 1652. Some were removed to County Clare, while others chose exile as Wild Geese on the European Continent. A significant number of O'Dwyer men found service in armies of Bourbon France, the Habsburg monarchy (including General Count John O'Dwyer, Governor of Belgrade) and even Romanov Russia (providing an Admiral).

Throughout history, the O'Dwyers would prove themselves capable generals and soldiers, and would participate in many armed conflicts:

O'Dwyer conflicts (non-exhaustive)
Nation	War Conflict	Dates:
Ireland	Battle of Clontarf Irish tribal warfare War of the Three Kingdoms Cromwell's Conquest of Ireland Nine Years' War Eleven Years' War Willamette War in Ireland Irish Rebellion of 1798	7th century AD to 18th century AD
United Kingdom	Anglo-Mysore Wars French Revolutionary Wars Napoleonic Wars: Battle of Waterloo; Venezuelan War of Independence Shimonoseki campaign Crimean War Zulu War Anglo-Nepalese War New Zealand Wars First Anglo-Sikh War Second Anglo-Burmese War WW1 WW2	18th century AD to 20th century AD
France	War of Spanish Succession American Revolutionary War: Siege of Savannah; Napoleonic Wars Franco-Prussian War	18th century AD to 19th century AD
USA	American Revolutionary War American Civil War: Army of the Potomac	18th century AD to 20th century AD
Spain	Eighty Years' War	18th century AD
Austria	War of Spanish Succession: Battle of Luzzara; Iberian Campaign; Austro-Turkish War (1716–1718)	18th century AD
Russia	Russo-Turkish War of 1768–74 Russo-Swedish War of 1788–1790	18th century AD

== Castles ==
In Kilnamanagh, the O'Dwyer built several castles, as part of their attempt to defend their lands. Today all of these castles are in ruin, but some of their remains can be seen in County Tipperary. Most were destroyed during the 17th century and all of them were confiscated during the times of Oliver Cromwell. These include:

- Ballysheeda Castle
- Ballagh Castle
- Clonyharp Castle
- Drumbane Castle
- Dundrum Castle (now the location of the 18th century Dumdrum House Hotel),
- Graigone Castle
- Killenure Castle (still largely intact)
- Milltown Castle.
- Moyaliffe Castle (now Moyaliffe House)

== Naming conventions ==
Male	Daughter	Wife (Long)	Wife (Short)
Ó Dubhuir	Ní Dhubhuir	Bean Uí Dhubhuir	Uí Dhubhuir
Ó Dubhuidhir	Ní Dhubhuidhir	Bean Uí Dhubhuidhir	Uí Dhubhuidhir

== List of people ==
The name has variants including Dwyer. People with the name O'Dwyer include:

O'Dwyer
- Pronunciation: /oʊ ˈdwaɪər/

Origin
- Meaning: "black"
- Region of origin: Ireland

Other names
- Variant form: Dwyer

- Declan O'Dwyer (b. 1987), Irish hurler
- Edmund O'Dwyer (d. 1654), Irish soldier
- Edmund Thomas O'Dwyer (1919–2005), Australian cricketer
- J. Mike O'Dwyer (b. ?), Australian weapon designer
- John Joseph O’Dwyer, 1st earl O’Dwyer, governor of Belgrade (b. ?)
- Joseph O'Dwyer (1841–1898), American physician
- Kelly O'Dwyer (born 1977), Australian politician
- Luke O'Dwyer (born 1980), Australian National Rugby League player
- Matt O'Dwyer (born 1972), American football player, NFL 1995–2005
- Michael O'Dwyer (1864–1940), administrator in British India
- Mick O'Dwyer (1936–2025), Irish Gaelic football player and manager
- Orla O'Dwyer (born 1998), Irish Australian rules footballer
- Pa O'Dwyer (1985–2026), Irish strongman
- Paul O'Dwyer (1907–1998), American politician and lawyer
- Richard O'Dwyer (born 1988), British web developer
- Robert O'Dwyer (1862–1949), Irish composer
- Sean O'Dwyer (born 1941), Irish Guards officer
- Steve O'Dwyer (born 1982), American professional poker player
- Steven O'Dwyer (born 1966), Australian rules footballer
- William O'Dwyer (1890–1964), American politician, the 100th mayor of New York City
- Devon O'Dwyer (born 1978), American Hustler
- Bryan K. O'Dwyer (born 1838), US Government scout, Wagonmaster, and Dodge City Saloon Keeper

== See also ==
- Irish clans
- Dwyer (name)
