= Milestone, County Tipperary =

Milestone Cloch an Mhíle
- Village
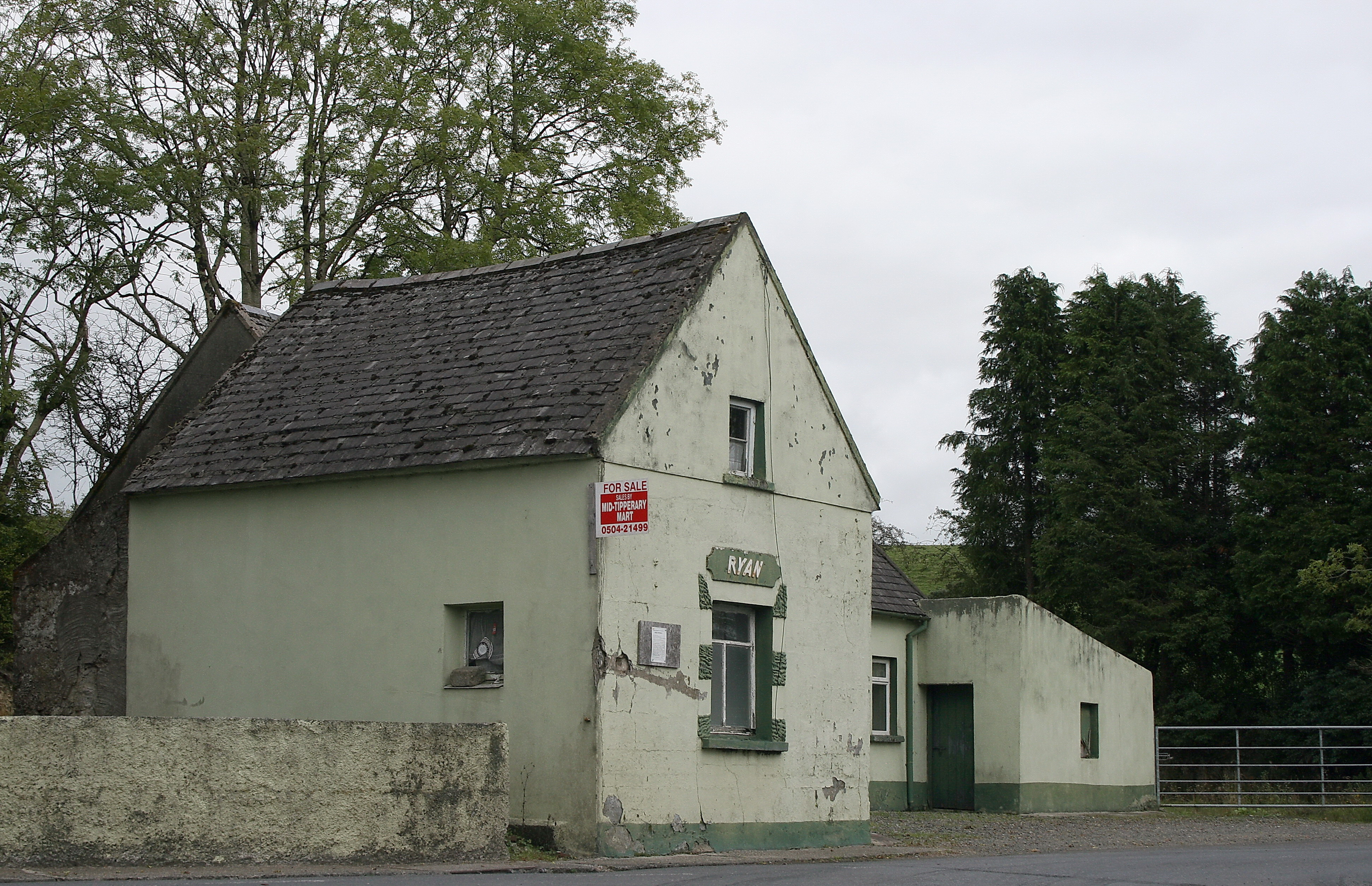
- Pub (closed) in Milestone

- Location in Ireland
- Coordinates: 52°40′34″N 8°05′02″W
- Country: Ireland
- Province: Munster
- County: County Tipperary
- Time zone: UTC+0 (WET)
  - Summer (DST): UTC-1 (IST (WEST))

Milestone (Irish: Cloch an Mhíle) is a small village in the townland of Graniara in County Tipperary, Ireland. It lies on the R503 Thurles to Limerick Regional Road where it is joined by the R497 Nenagh to Tipperary town road.

It is located in the Slieve Felim Mountains.

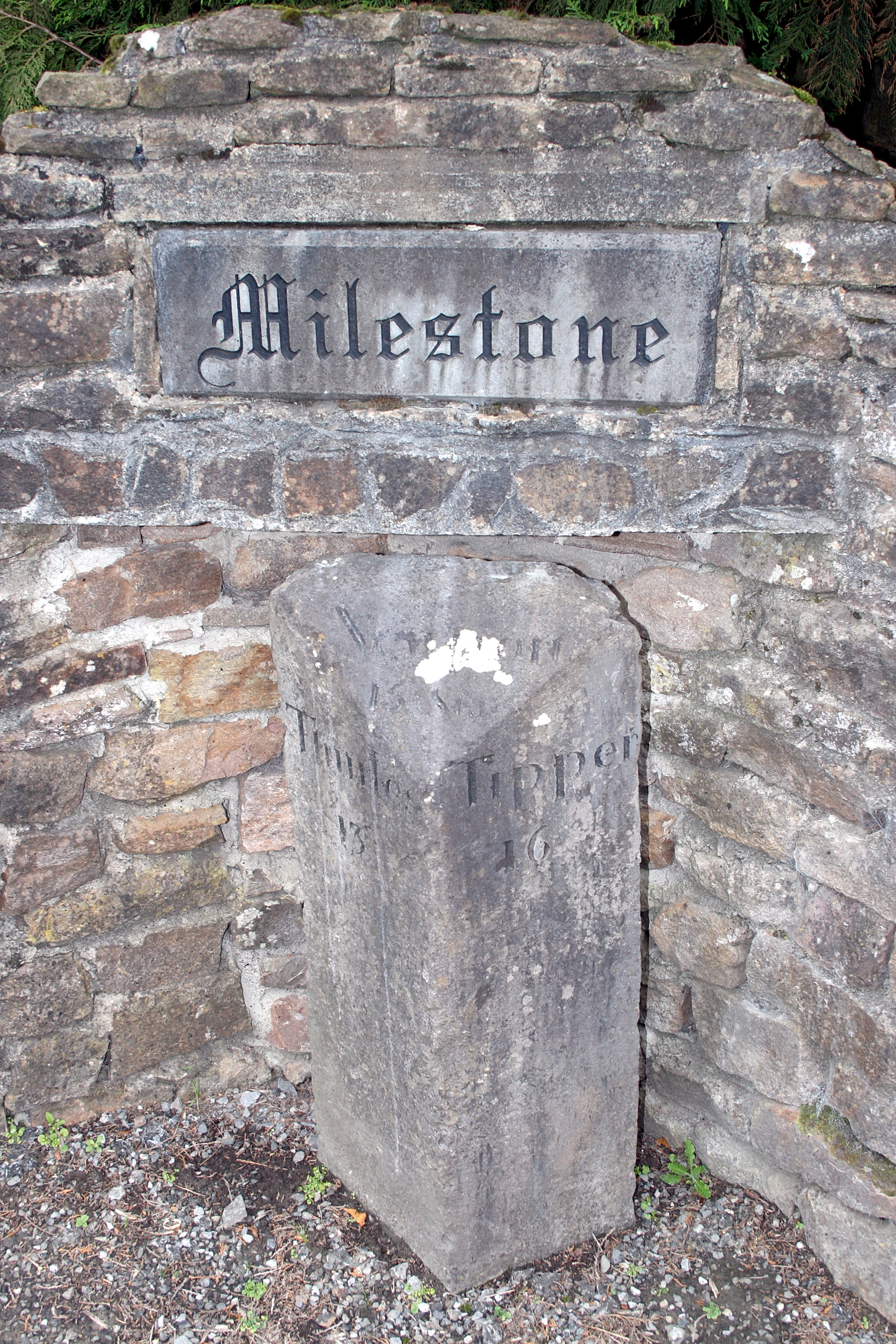
A milestone at Milestone

== See also ==
- List of towns and villages in Ireland
