= R499 road (Ireland) =

Road in Ireland

R499 road
- Bóthar R499
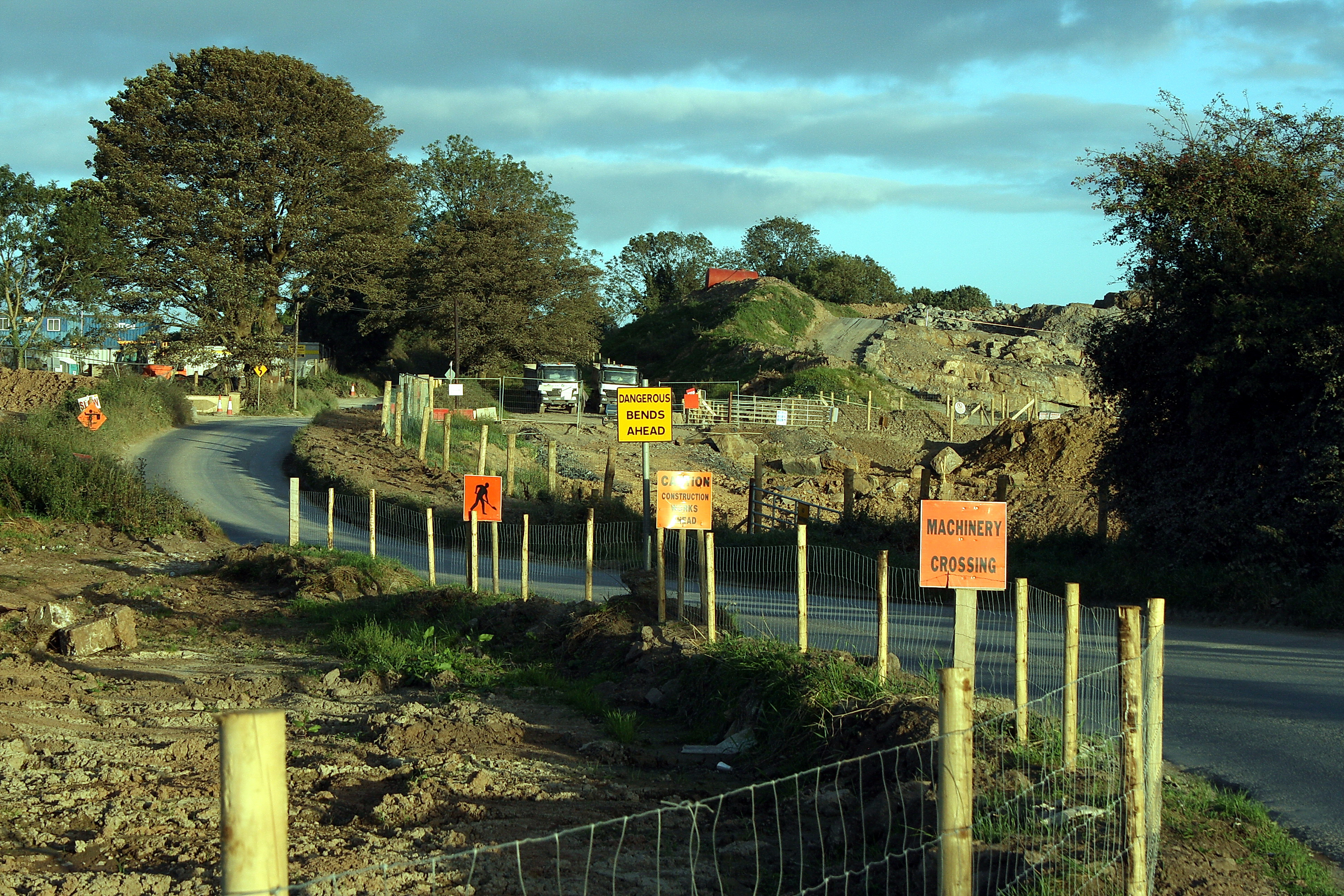
- R499 crossing the M7 construction works east of Birdhill (2007)

Route information
- Length: 23 km (14 mi)

Location
- Country: Ireland
- Primary destinations: County Tipperary; R445 seven kilometers east of Birdhill; Passes under the M7 between Limerick and Nenagh; Bridge over Limerick–Ballybrophy railway line; Silvermines – (R500); Dolla – (R497); Crosses the Nenagh River; (R498); Toomevara – terminates at the R445

Highway system
- Roads in Ireland; Motorways; Primary; Secondary; Regional

The R499 road is a regional road in Ireland which runs southwest-northeast from the R445 7 km east of Birdhill, County Tipperary, rejoining the R445 in Toomevara, County Tipperary. The route is 23 km (14 mi) long.

== See also ==
- Roads in Ireland
- National primary road
- National secondary road
