= Hollyford, County Tipperary =

Hollyford Áth an Chuilinn
- Village
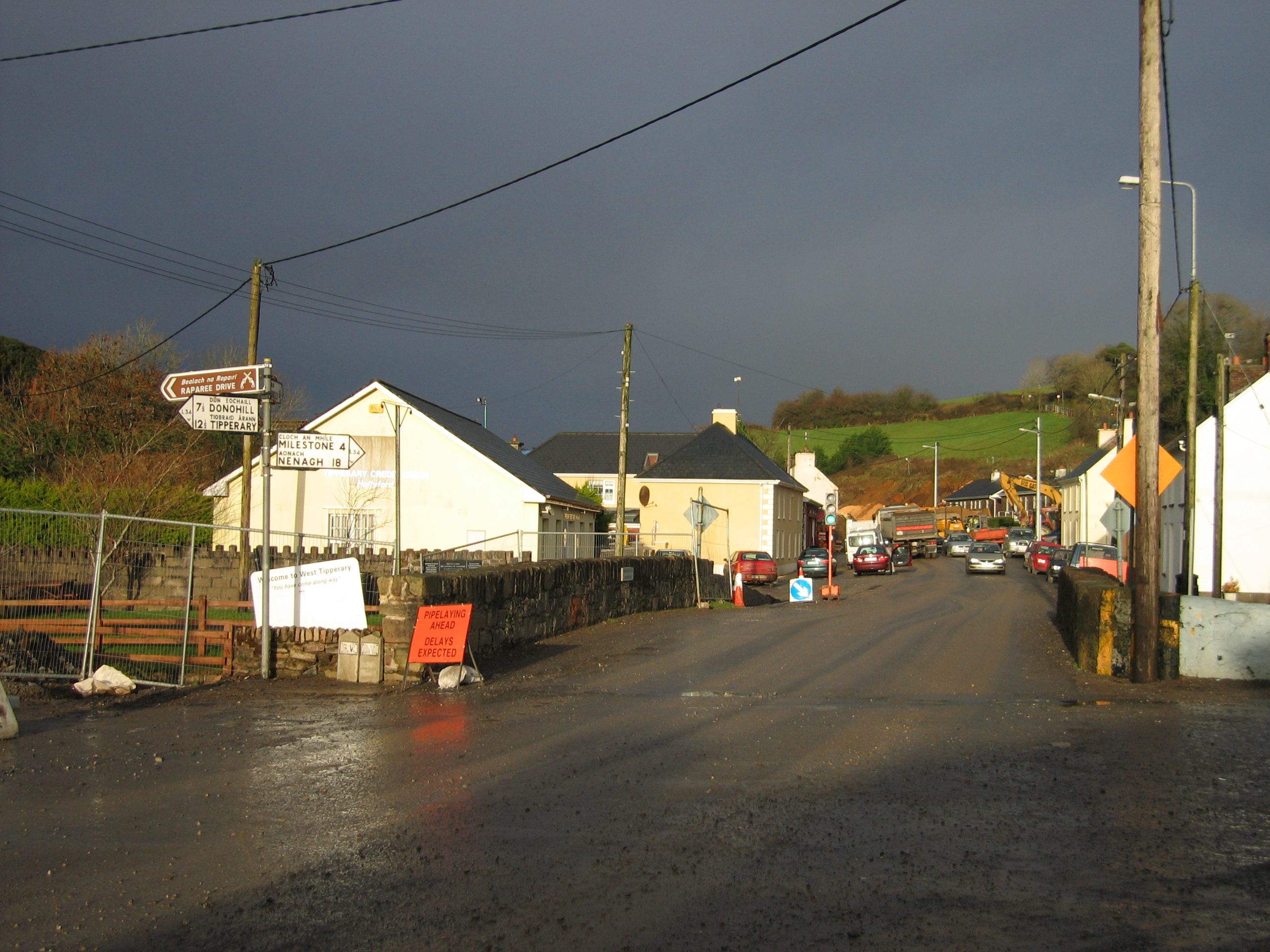

- Location in Ireland
- Coordinates: 52°38′03″N 8°06′39″W
- Country: Ireland
- Province: Munster
- County: County Tipperary

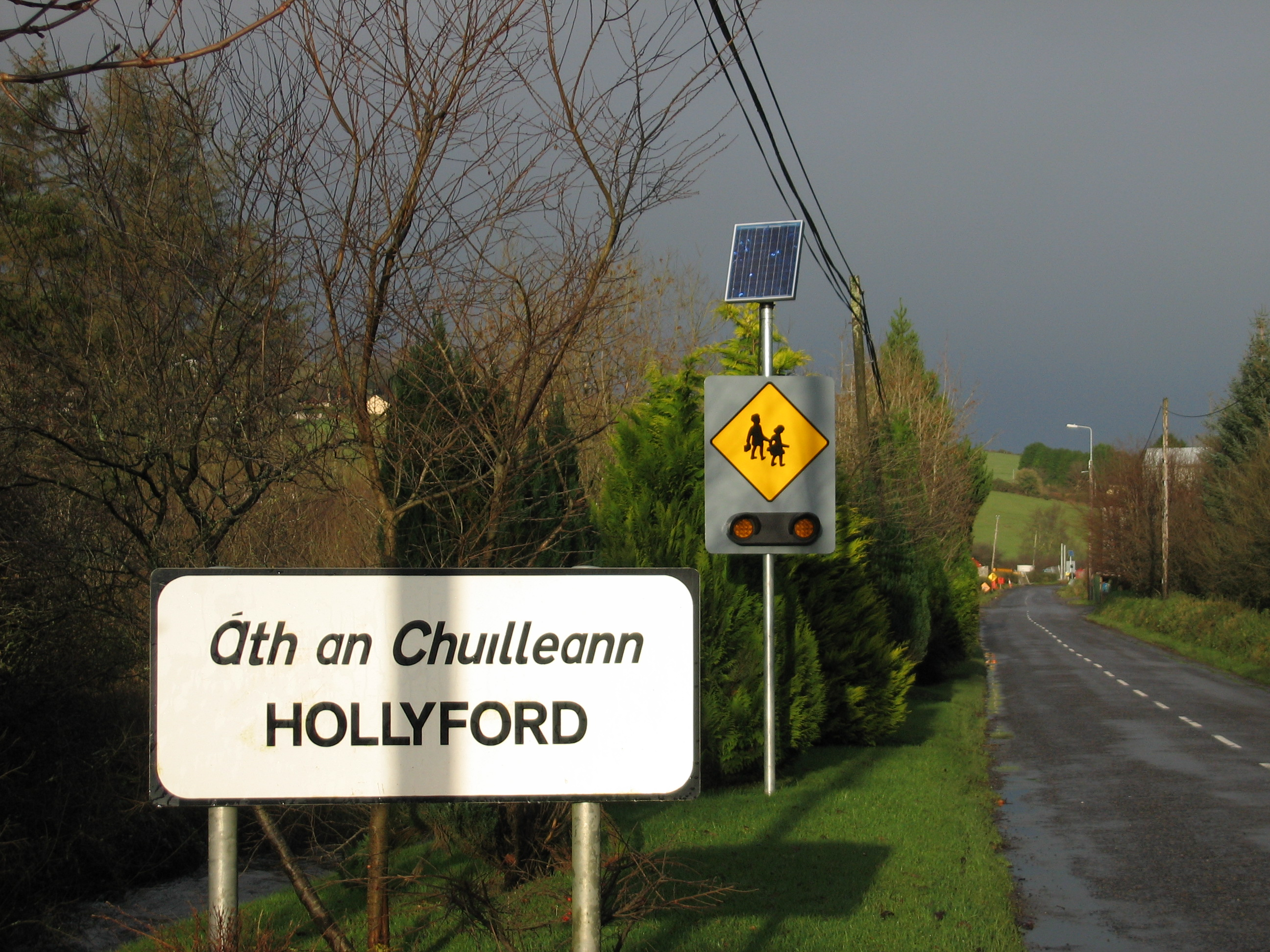
Note the misspelling of the Irish version of the placename on the sign, which should properly read Áth an Chuillinn.

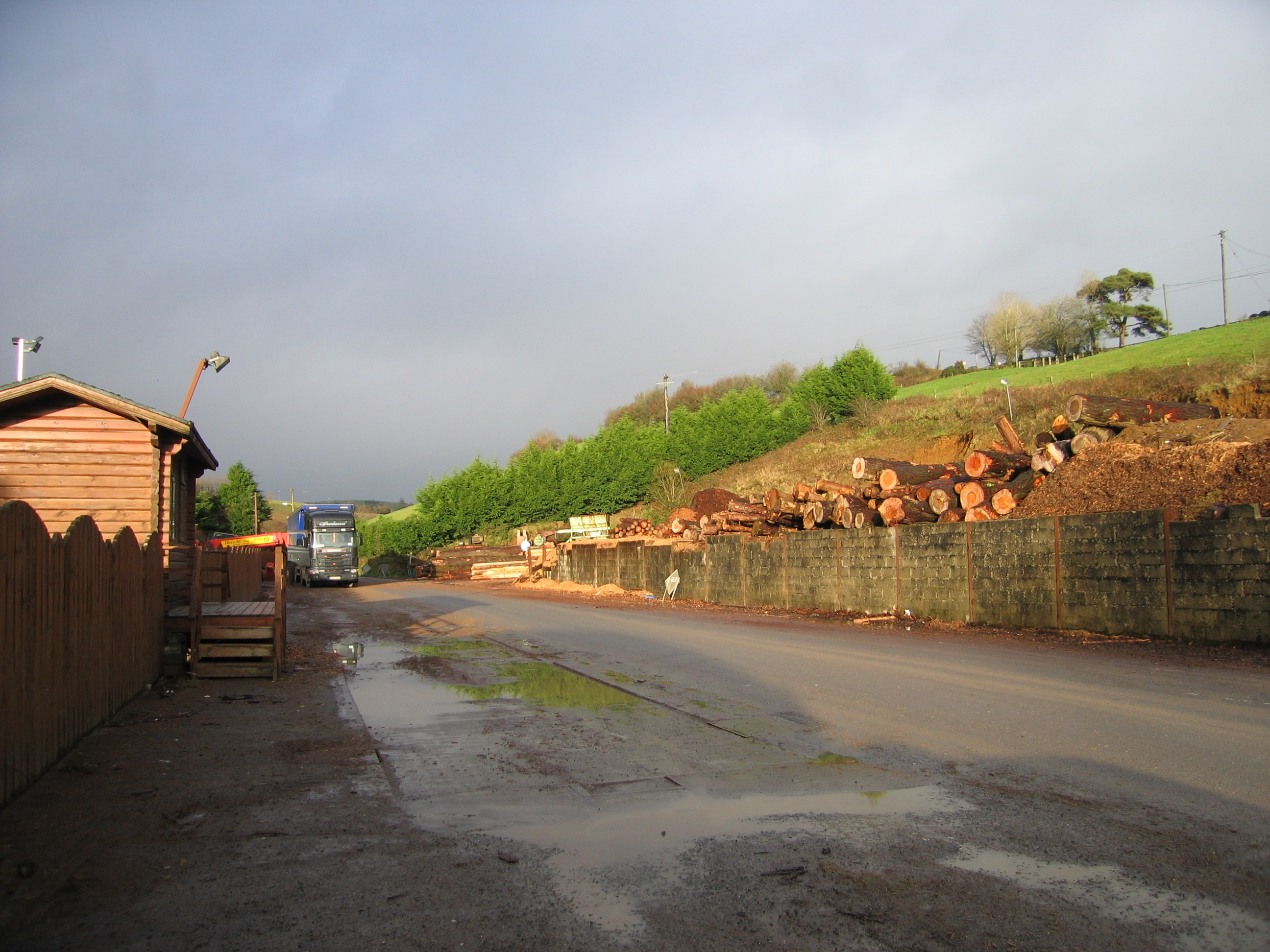
Hollyford; R497 Regional road passes through sawmill

Hollyford (Irish: Áth an Chuillinn) is a small village in County Tipperary, Ireland. It is in the Roman Catholic parish of Kilcommon and Hollyford and Rearcross, in the Archdiocese of Cashel and Emly, and is in the barony of Kilnamanagh Lower.

Hollyford lies in a valley running through the Slieve Felim Mountains. It is on the R497 regional road, which runs north–south for 55 km through the Silvermine and Slieve Felim Mountains from Nenagh to Tipperary Town.

== History ==
It was historically known in Irish as Áth Bhéal a' Chuillinn (anglicised Aghbellacullin), Béal a' Chuillinn (anglicised Bellacullin) and Cluain Mhurchaidh (anglicised Clonmurragha).

Part of the Cian route Patrick Sarsfield took for his daring attack on the Williamite siege train during the Siege of Limerick (1690) is marked out today, as "Sarsfield's Ride", and is now a walking and cycling route. It passes near the village of Hollyford. The O'Sullivan Beara Route, which passes through the village, runs from Castletownbere, County Cork for 350 km (220 mi) to Monaghan.

During the War of Independence on 11 May 1920, the IRA attacked the RIC barracks at Hollyford.

== Industry ==
The only industry of any scale in the village today is the sawmill. The surrounding hills are heavily forested on the less productive land with agriculture mainly on the better areas.

Hollyford was briefly a location of some copper mining, the mines were mainly worked between 1837 and 1839, and again between 1848 and 1862.

== Anglesey Road SAC ==
Anglesey Road is a special area of conservation (site reference code 002125) along the R497 road just north of the village. It is a small site containing a variety of habitats and species found in unimproved upland grassland within the steep valley of the Multeen, a tributary of the River Suir. The main threat to the site is agricultural improvement and afforestation. The road was named after the Marquess of Anglesey who gave orders to have it built. The Marquess and his retinue were traversing the hill country by horse and carriage when they lost their bearings and sought shelter in the parish priest's house, who provided hospitality with an overnight stay and victuals for their ongoing journey. So impressed by the priest's magnanimity and generosity, the Marquess enquired of the pastor if he could do anything for him, to which the reputed reply was "build us a road". In due course, the Anglesey Line was laid and is still in use through the hills to this day.

== Sport ==
Hollyford's local GAA club is Sean Tracey's GAA and is named after Irish rebel Seán Treacy, who was born nearby.

There is also a Gaelic handball alley in Hollyford which was built in the 1950s and renovated in 1991. The renovation was paid for by local residents, and included the restoration of the handball alley.

== See also ==
- List of towns and villages in Ireland
