= Borrisoleigh =

Town in County Tipperary, Munster, Ireland

Borrisoleigh Buiríos Ó Luigheach
- Village
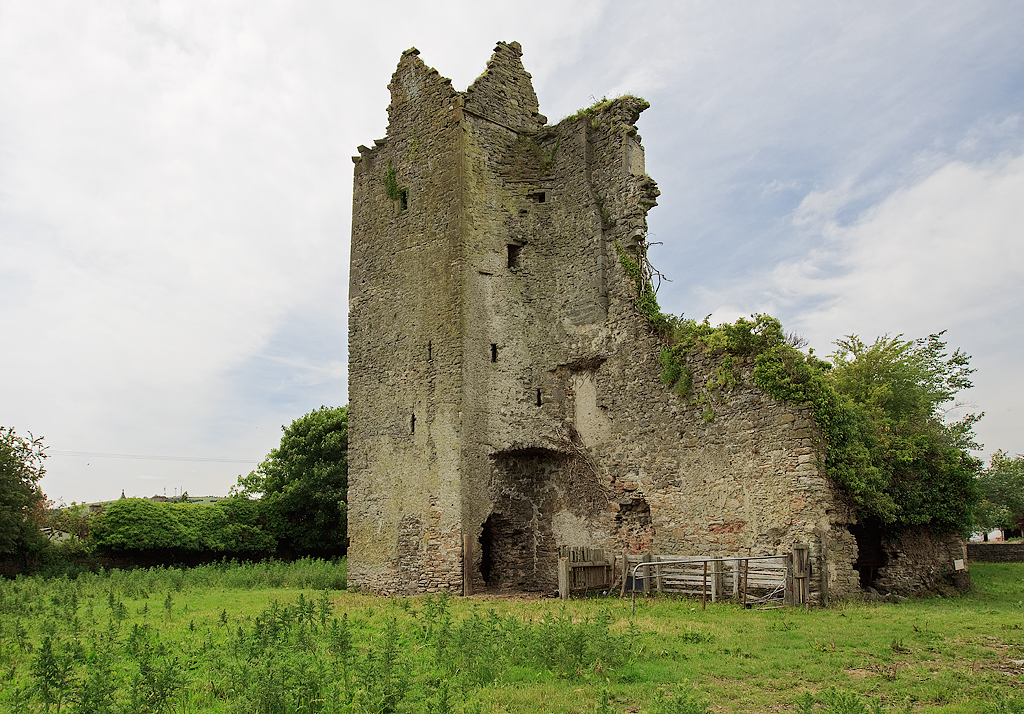
- Bourke's Castle

- Location in Ireland
- Coordinates: 52°45′07″N 7°57′23″W
- Country: Ireland
- Province: Munster
- County: County Tipperary

Population (2016)
  - Total: 679
- Time zone: UTC+0 (WET)
  - Summer (DST): UTC-1 (IST (WEST))

Borrisoleigh (Irish: Buiríos Ó Luigheach, meaning 'The Burgage of the territory of O'Lea or I‑leagh') is a small town in County Tipperary, Ireland. At the 2016 census, it had a population of 679. It is in the ecclesiastical parish of Borrisoleigh and Ileigh in the Roman Catholic Archdiocese of Cashel and Emly.

== Location and access ==
The town is part of the civil parish of Glenkeen in the historic barony of Kilnamanagh Upper. It is situated on the R498 Nenagh–Thurles road. To the east, the R501 goes to Templemore with fine views of the Devil's Bit mountain on the left hand side near Drom and Barnane. Borrisoleigh is 20 km south-east of Nenagh, 13 km north-west of Thurles, and 10 km south-west of Templemore.

== History ==
Borrisoleigh derives its name from the ancient territory of Uí Luighdheach in which it was situated. An annual cattle fair was held here every 27 November until the 1960s.

The first recorded settlement here was an abbey established by St. Cualan at Glean Caoin, anglicised as "Glankeen Abbey." Kilcuilan (St. Cualan's Church) was dedicated to him at a nearby holy well. A bell attributed to this saint, known as the "Bearnan Culan" or "Glankeen Bell" is now housed at the British Museum in London. A replica may be seen in the sanctuary of the parish church in Borrisoleigh.

After the Norman invasion of Ireland in the 12th century, the O'Dwyer and DeBurgo clans established a fortress on the River Camoge as a defence against the native settlement at Ileigh. Its ruins may still be seen as you leave Borrisoleigh on the Templemore Road.

In October 1846, absentee landlord Henry Dawson-Damer, 3rd Earl of Portarlington, threw a banquet at the Temperance Hall in Borrisoleigh while the surrounding parish was suffering through the Great Famine. He left a meager one hundred pound donation to the local Poor Relief Committee when he returned to England.

=== Catholic church ===
The parish priest Michael Slattery was appointed Archbishop of Cashel and Emly in 1833. Slattery was succeeded by Father William Morris, who led 118 local men in signing the Cormack Petition in 1858. This document provides a vital snapshot of the town's population, including its largest families (in this order): Ryan, Bourke, Kennedy, Dwyer, Maher, Gleeson, Harrington, and Patterson. It also shows the top 10 male given names were: John, James, Patrick, William, Michael, Daniel, Martin, Philip, Thomas, Edmond (tie), and Jeremiah (tie).

In 1877, Catholics from across the Province of Munster met to sign an appeal to Archbishop Croke of Cashel, urging him to secure the right to a religious university education. Representing Borrisoleigh were its parish priest Patrick, Canon Morris; Joseph Power, licensed surgeon; and Poor Law guardians Richard Chadwick and John Bourke.

Borrisoleigh has produced two well-known Catholic bishops: Joseph Shanahan (1871–1943) and Thomas Quinlan (1896–1970).

=== Church of Ireland ===
In 1785, a parish church for the Church of Ireland parish of Glenkeen was built in Borrisoleigh, on the site where St. Brigid's Cemetery is today. The glebe-house, which had a glebe of 11 acres (4.5 ha), was in the townland of Glenkeen. When the parish church was closed, the glebe house was sold in 1870.

== Amenities ==
Among its attractions are some traditional shop fronts, and a 15th-century tower house. An inscribed slab inserted into the gable of one of a pair of red sandstone houses are engraved the names Richard Burke and Ellis Hurley, 1643. Walter Doolin was the architect of the church in the main street. The window and door surrounds were quarried at Drombane, 12 miles (19 km) away. It is similar to the stone used in Cormac's Chapel, Cashel. Borrisoleigh has a number of small shops and a small supermarket, petrol stations, pubs, a post office, hair salons, schools, a church, a community hall and GAA sporting facilities.

== Education ==
Scoil Naomh Cualán is a Roman Catholic Primary School in Borrisoleigh, Co Tipperary.

St. Joseph's College is a Catholic lay co-educational second-level school.

== Economy ==
Borrisoleigh's economy is driven by the Gleeson Group, now owned by C&C, which markets Tipperary Natural Mineral Water, Bulmer's Cider and several other brands.

== Sport ==
The local Gaelic Athletic Association club is Borris–Ileigh GAA. The club's name is distinctive and is not to be confused with the place name Borrisoleigh. Former All-Ireland champion hurlers with the club were Liam Devaney, Ned Ryan, Paddy Kenny, Seán Kenny and Jimmy Finn whose playing years were in the period 1949–1965. Noel O'Dwyer was an all Ireland medal winner in 1971. In 1987, Richard Stakelum captained Tipperary to their first Munster championship in 17 years. Also in that era, brothers Bobby and Aidan Ryan were victorious in the 1989 and 1991 All-Ireland Championships, Bobby being the victorious captain in 1989. 2010 saw two further all Ireland medal winners Paddy Stapleton and Brendan Maher. The Borris-Ileigh club were All Ireland senior club champions in 1987. In 2016, Tipperary won the All Ireland defeating Kilkenny. Brendan Maher captained the team with Dan McCormack and Paddy Stapleton being members of the squad.

== Notable people ==
- John Ryan, recipient of the Victoria Cross
- Brendan Maher, hurler

== See also ==
- List of towns and villages in Ireland
