= Kilcommon and Hollyford =

The parish of Kilcommon and Hollyford is an ecclesiastical parish in the Roman Catholic Archdiocese of Cashel and Emly. It includes the villages of Rearcross and Kilcommon in County Tipperary and the village of Hollyford in County Tipperary, Ireland. The parish is located in the Slieve Felim Mountains close to the border with County Limerick.

== Churches ==
Churches within the parish include:

- St. Patrick's Church, Kilcommon
- St. Joseph's Church, Hollyford
- Our Lady of Visitation, Rearcross

== Sport ==
Hollyford's local GAA club is Sean Treacy's GAA and is named after Irish rebel and IRA member Seán Treacy who was born nearby.
