= R497 road (Ireland) =

Road in Ireland

R497 road
- Bóthar R497
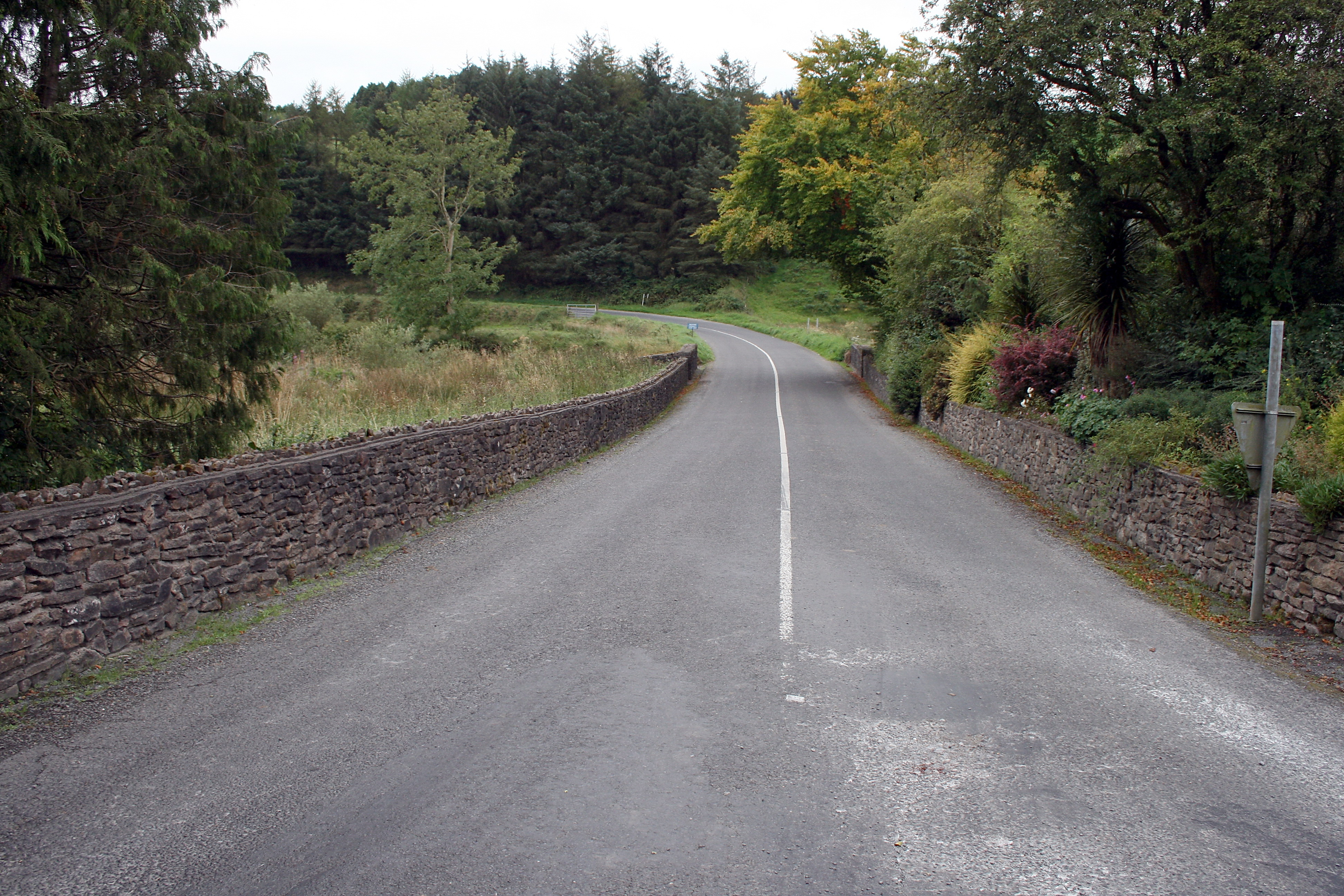
- R497 leaving Milestone towards Hollyford

Route information
- Length: 57 km (35 mi)

Location
- Country: Ireland
- Primary destinations: County Tipperary; Nenagh – leaves town centre at junction with the R445; Passes under the M7 south of Nenagh; (R500); Dolla – (R499); Curreeny; Joins the R503; Milestone – leaves the R503; Road passes through Anglesey Road Special Area of Conservation; Hollyford – Where is passes through a working sawmill; (R505); Donohill; Crosses the Dublin-Cork railway line at a level crossing; Tipperary Town – (R601); terminates at the N24

Highway system
- Roads in Ireland; Motorways; Primary; Secondary; Regional

The R497 road is a regional road in Ireland which runs north-south from Nenagh, County Tipperary to the N24 in Tipperary Town.

The entire route is in County Tipperary and is 57 km (35 mi) long. Part of the road is known as the Anglesey Road, named after the Marquis of Anglesey who gave orders to have it built.

Just north of the village of Hollyford the road passes through Anglesey Road special area of conservation (site reference code 002125), a small site containing a variety of habitats and species found in unimproved upland grassland within the steep valley of the Multeen, a tributary of the River Suir. The main threat to the site is agricultural improvement and afforestation.

== See also ==
- Roads in Ireland
- National primary road
- National secondary road
