= Sean Mackey (civil engineer) =

Irish engineer

Sean Mackey, OBE, KGS (1917–1997) was a prominent Irish civil engineer.

== Biography ==
Sean Mackey was born in Dolla, County Tipperary, Ireland, in 1917. Having attended Mount Saint Joseph College in Roscrea, he entered University College Dublin, where he obtained a BE civil engineering degree and BSc degree. He subsequently went on to get a master's degree in UCD before marrying Elizabeth Ann (Lilian) Mulleaney and emigrating to England, where he secured a job with leading construction steelmaker Dorman Long.

In 1947 he secured a post as senior lecturer in Leeds University, where he obtained a PhD in 1951. Then in 1953, he was invited to take up the newly created head of engineering post at the fledgling Indian Institute of Technology in Kharagpur, Eastern India. His teaching philosophy was always to encourage a 'practical' hands-on approach to engineering, and to this end, he encouraged his students to embark on a project to design and build a swimming pool complex on the institute's campus.

Finally in 1956, he moved to the University of Hong Kong to take up the post of Taikoo Professor of Engineering. Within a few years he had expanded the engineering faculty from one department to four, and later went on to be appointed dean of the joint Faculty of Engineering and Architecture. Outside of academia, he was a founding council member of the Hong Kong Management Association in 1960.

During his time in the University of Hong Kong, he initiated an intensive research programme studying the effects of wind on tall buildings, attracting global interest and culminating in an International Seminar in 1961. 1968 saw him help set up and become the first president of, the Hong Kong branch of the Institution of Structural Engineers. In 1962 he was elected president of the Hong Kong St Patrick's Society and was also for many years, a Steward of the prestigious Hong Kong Jockey Club. He also founded and chaired the Colony's 'British Engineering Week' in 1966, which was opened by the late Princess Margaret. In recognition of this work, the British Government awarded Professor Mackey the OBE- honorary, because he was the holder of an Irish passport.

Academically, he went on to receive fellowships of both the Institution of Civil Engineers, the Institution of Structural Engineers and the Geological Society. In 1965, Mackey achieved a Doctor of Science (DSc) degree from his alma mater, University College Dublin (National University of Ireland) and in 1972, received a second DSc (Honorary) from the University of Hong Kong.

In 1965, he was appointed a Justice of the Peace by the Colony's Legislative Council, and subsequently chaired a number of committees, including one specifically set up to investigate corruption within the Hong Kong Police Force. In 1978 as a result of his untiring voluntary work with the international Caritas foundation, he was honoured by the Vatican with a Knighthood of the Order of St. Gregory the Great.

After nineteen years service, he retired from The University of Hong Kong in 1976, and went on to practise successfully as an independent Consulting Engineer for a further eight years, working on major projects such as the new Kwai Tsing Container Terminals and new airport Hong Kong International Airport on Chek Lap Kok Island.

In 1984 Sean Mackey fully retired and returned with his wife Lilian to his beloved Ireland, to be with his three sons and seven grandchildren, and to concentrate on his other great love – fishing. Even in retirement, he still found time to attend and address several meetings of the Irish Institute of Engineers. Sean Mackey died aged 79, in June 1997.
