= Borrisoleigh and Ileigh =

Catholic parish in County Tipperary, Ireland

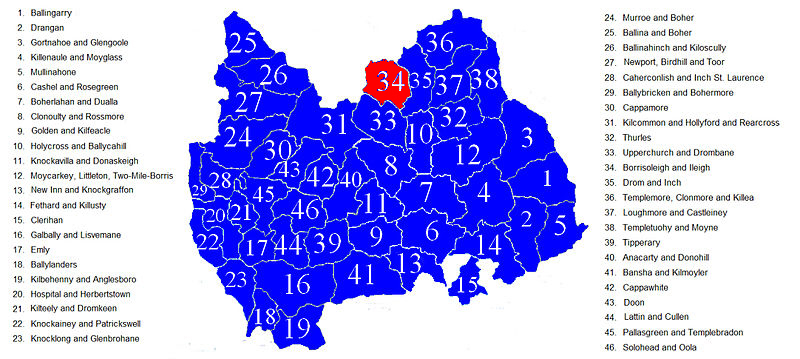
The parish, numbered 34, within the Archdiocese of Cashel and Emly

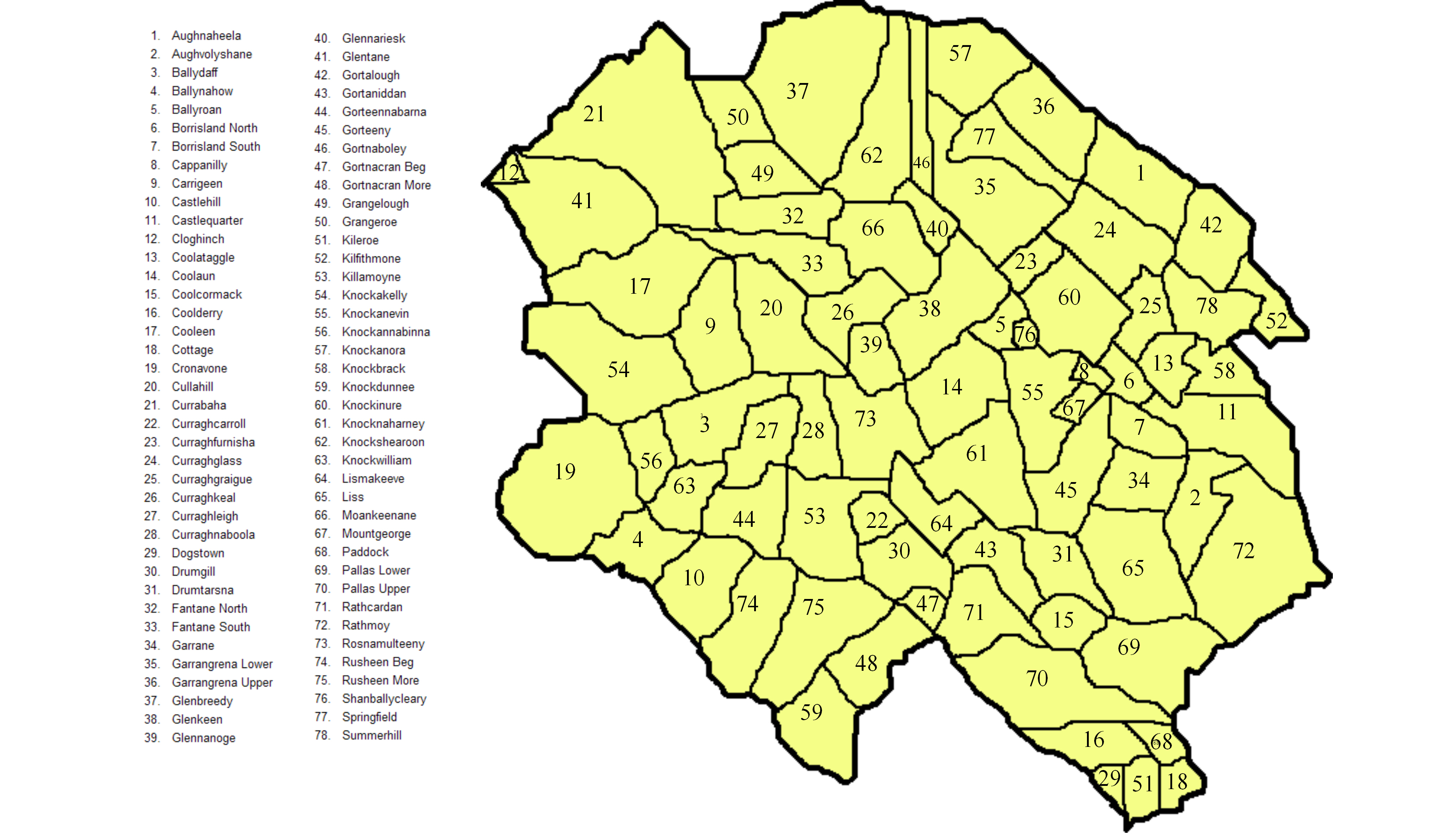
Townlands in the parish

Borrisoleigh and Ileigh is an ecclesiastical parish in the Thurles deanery of the Roman Catholic Archdiocese of Cashel and Emly in Ireland. This parish is unusual among Catholic parishes in Ireland in that it is co-extensive with a civil parish, that of Glenkeen.

The parish church, located in the town of Borrisoleigh, is dedicated to the Sacred Heart and is paired with an older church some three kilometers away at Ileigh.

Clubs in the parish include the Borris-Ileigh GAA club.

== See also ==
- Catholic Church in Ireland
