= Pat Dwyer (hurler) =

Irish sportsman

Patrick Dwyer
Personal information
- Native name: Pádraig Ó Duibhir (Irish)
- Born: 19 December 1965 (age 60) Hugginstown, County Kilkenny, Ireland
- Occupation: Farmer
- Height: 6 ft 1 in (185 cm)

Sport
- Sport: Hurling
- Position: Full-back
Club
- Years: Club
- Carrickshock
Club titles
- Kilkenny titles: 0
Inter-county
- Years: County
- 1989-1996: Kilkenny
Inter-county titles
- Leinster titles: 3
- All-Irelands: 2
- NHL: 2
- All Stars: 1

Patrick Dwyer (born 19 December 1965) is an Irish hurling manager and former player. At club level he played with Carrickshock and was also a member of the Kilkenny senior hurling team. He usually lined out as a full-back.

== Career ==
Dwyer first came to prominence at juvenile and underage levels with the Carrickshock club before eventually joining the club's top adult team. He first appeared on the inter-county scene with the Kilkenny junior team that won the All-Ireland Junior Championship title in 1988. This success saw Dwyer drafted on to the Kilkenny senior hurling team in 1989. He was full-back on the Kilkenny team that won consecutive All-Ireland Championship titles in 1992 and 1993. Dwyer's other honours include two National League titles, three consecutive Leinster Championship medals and an All-Star Award. In retirement from playing he became involved in team management with Carrickshock.

== Honours ==
=== Team ===
Kilkenny

- All-Ireland Senior Hurling Championship: 1992, 1993
- Leinster Senior Hurling Championship: 1991, 1992, 1993
- National Hurling League: 1989-90, 1994-95
- All-Ireland Junior Hurling Championship: 1988
- Leinster Junior Hurling Championship: 1988

=== Individual ===
Awards

- All-Star Award: 1997
