= R503 road (Ireland) =

Road in Ireland

R503 road
- Bóthar R503
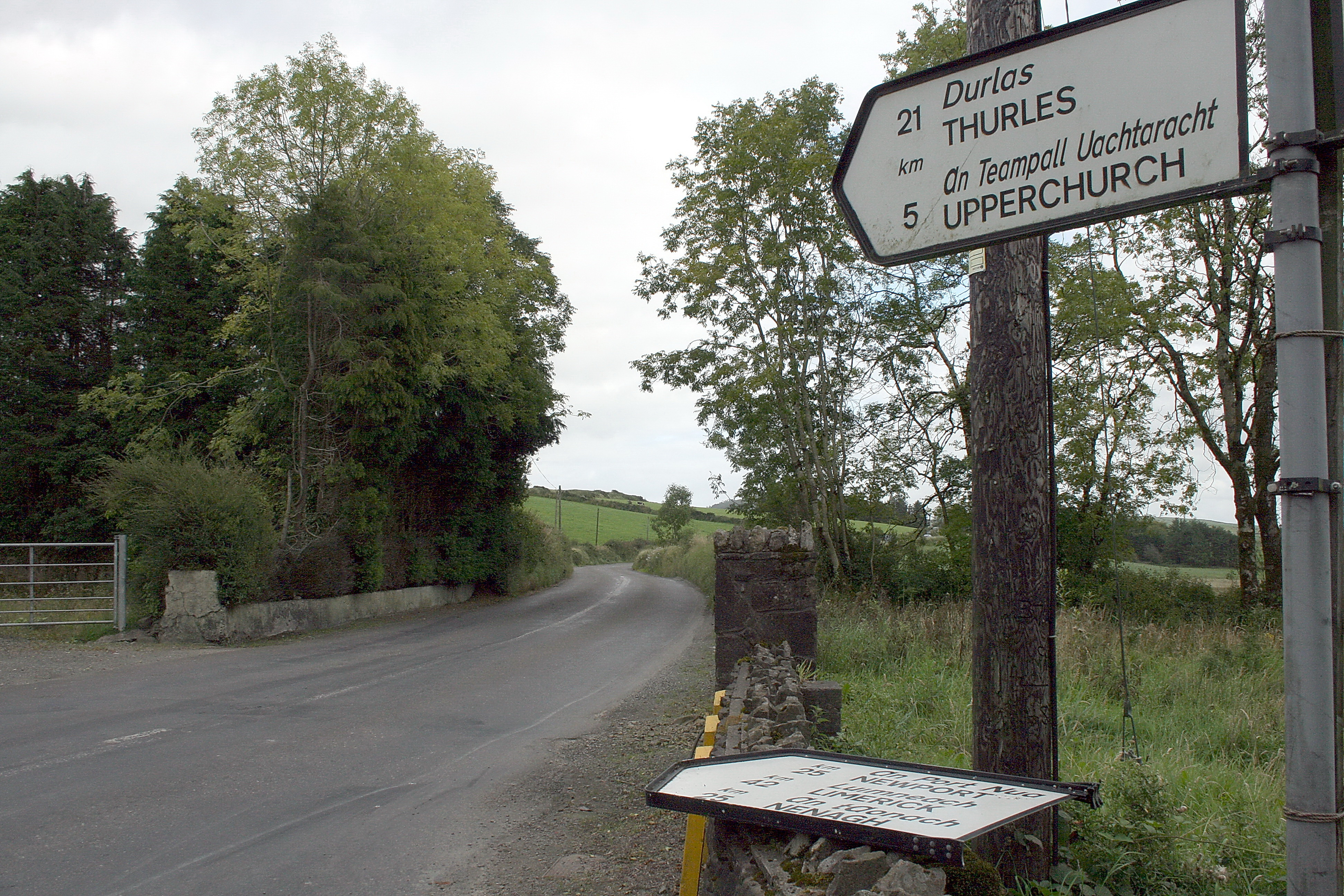
- The R503 in Milestone, County Tipperary

Route information
- Length: 55 km (34 mi)

Location
- Country: Ireland
- Primary destinations: County Tipperary; Thurles – leaves the R498; Ballycahill; Upperchurch; Milestone – joins the R497; Leaves the R497; Rearcross; Newport – (R504); County Limerick; Terminates at a roundabout junction with the N7 and the R445

Highway system
- Roads in Ireland; Motorways; Primary; Secondary; Regional

The R503 road is a regional road in Ireland which runs east–west from Thurles, County Tipperary to the N7 west of Limerick City. The entire route is in County Tipperary and is 55 km (34 mi) long.

== See also ==
- Roads in Ireland
- National primary road
- National secondary road
