= Marc Dwyer =

Australian radio presenter (born 1987)

Marc Dwyer (born 19 June 1987) is an Australian radio presenter and former actor.

He appeared as Dylan in Ray Lawrence's 2000 acclaimed film Lantana, playing the son of Anthony Lapaglia and Kerry Armstrong. This was followed by a 2001 double episode of the Australian drama All Saints. Dwyer also appeared in various television and photographic advertisements between 2000 and 2005.

Dwyer started his radio career at 101.3 Sea FM on the Central Coast of New South Wales.

Dwyer applied and was accepted into the Australian Film Television and Radio School to complete a graduate diploma in commercial radio broadcasting, completed in October 2008.
