= Moyaliff =

Moyaliff Maigh Ailbhe
- Townland
- Location in Ireland
- Coordinates: 52°34′27″N 7°53′45″W
- Country: Ireland
- Province: Munster
- County: County Tipperary
- Elevation: 100 m (330 ft)
- Time zone: UTC+0 (WET)
  - Summer (DST): UTC-1 (IST (WEST))
- Irish Grid Reference: S046555

Moyaliff (historically Moaliffe "Mealiff", from Irish: Maigh Ailbhe) is a civil parish and townland in County Tipperary, Ireland. The civil parish is in the barony of Kilnamanagh Upper. It has 31 townlands in total; 27 of these townlands are in the Roman Catholic Parish of Upperchurch-Drombane, three in the Roman Catholic parish of Holycross-Ballycahill and one townland Moyaliff itself shared between the two.

The name is composed of two Irish words: Maigh, meaning 'plain' and "Ailbhe", Irish for Alvy, giving the full name of Maigh Ailbhe or Alvy's Plain.

== Townlands ==
The civil parish has 31 townlands:

- Áth Longfoirt/Allengort
- Béal Átha an Oidhre/Ballynera
- Béal Átha hUachtair/Ballyoughter
- An Cillín Liath/Killinleigh
- An Cláirín/Clareen
- Cluain Uí Thorpa/Clonyharp
- Cnoc an Charna Duibh/Knockacarhanduff Commons
- Coill Pennefather/Pennefatherswood
- Cúil na Muine/Coolnamoney
- An Chúlchoill/Coolkill
- Currach na Tinne/Curraghnatinny
- An Drom Bán/Drumbane
- Drom Daibhche/Drumdiha
- Dromainn an Ghabhair/Drumminagower
- Dromainn Philib/Drumminphilip
- Dúraí/Dooree Commons
- Faill an Ghabhail/Foilagoule
- An Ghléib/Glebe
- Goirtín an Phóire/Gorteenaphoria
- Gort an Chuaille/Gortahoola
- Leacain Dara/Lackandarra
- An Lisín/Lisheen
- Maigh Ailbhe/Moyaliff
- Ros Caoin Beag/Roskeen Little
- Ros Caoin Theas/Roskeen South
- Ros Caoin Thuaidh/Roskeen North
- Ros Caoin/Roskeen
- Ros Moilt/Rosmult
- Ros na gCeanannaí/Rosnacananee
- An Seanbhaile Dubh/Shanballyduff
- Tuairín Cuileannach/Tooreencullinag

== Historical barony ==
According to the Down Survey of Ireland, part of the historical parish of Moyaliff (then known as Moaliffe) was in the now defunct barony of Killnelongurty.

== See also ==
- Walter Butler of Nodstown
