= J. Mike O'Dwyer =

Australian inventor

James Michael O'Dwyer is an inventor who grew up in Muttaburra, Queensland, Australia, chiefly known for his Metal Storm weapon.

== Biography ==
O'Dwyer completed Year 12 education, then went on to be a manager at Woolworths before his inventions were able to provide an income.

An American company, Breeze Technology Holdings, has the rights to one of his inventions – air-cooled sneakers.

== Metal Storm ==
O'Dwyer spent 15 years developing a rapid-fire gun prototype called Metal Storm that uses stacked projectiles. Metal Storm can fire up to 1,000,000 rounds per minute, or 16,000 rounds per second, and was declared by Guinness World Records to be the world's most intelligent and fastest firearms. The technology was being commercialised by a company also called Metal Storm, but they requested their shares be suspended from trading on 20 July 2012 and later was placed into voluntary administration.

In late 2015, DefendTex, an Australian-based defence R&D company, acquired the intellectual property, trademarks and other assets of Metal Storm.
