= R501 road (Ireland) =

Road in Ireland

R501 road
- Bóthar R501

Route information
- Length: 9 km (5.6 mi)

Location
- Country: Ireland
- Primary destinations: County Tipperary; Templemore continues from (N62) at junction of Richmond and Thurles Road.; Passes Drom (1 km via local road); Local road to Devil's Bit Mountain; Borrisoleigh – terminates at the R498

Highway system
- Roads in Ireland; Motorways; Primary; Secondary; Regional

The R501 road is a regional road in County Tipperary in Ireland linking the N62 national secondary road in Templemore to the R498 in Borrisoleigh.

The road is 9 km (5.6 mi) long.

== See also ==
- Roads in Ireland
- National primary road
- National secondary road
