= Glenkeen =

Civil parish in County Tipperary, Ireland

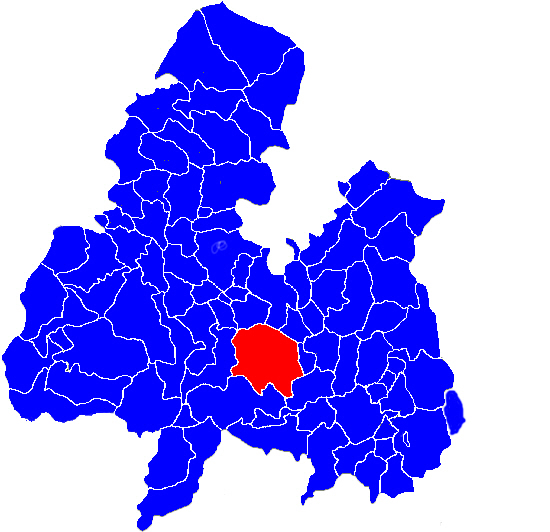
Location of the parish within north Tipperary

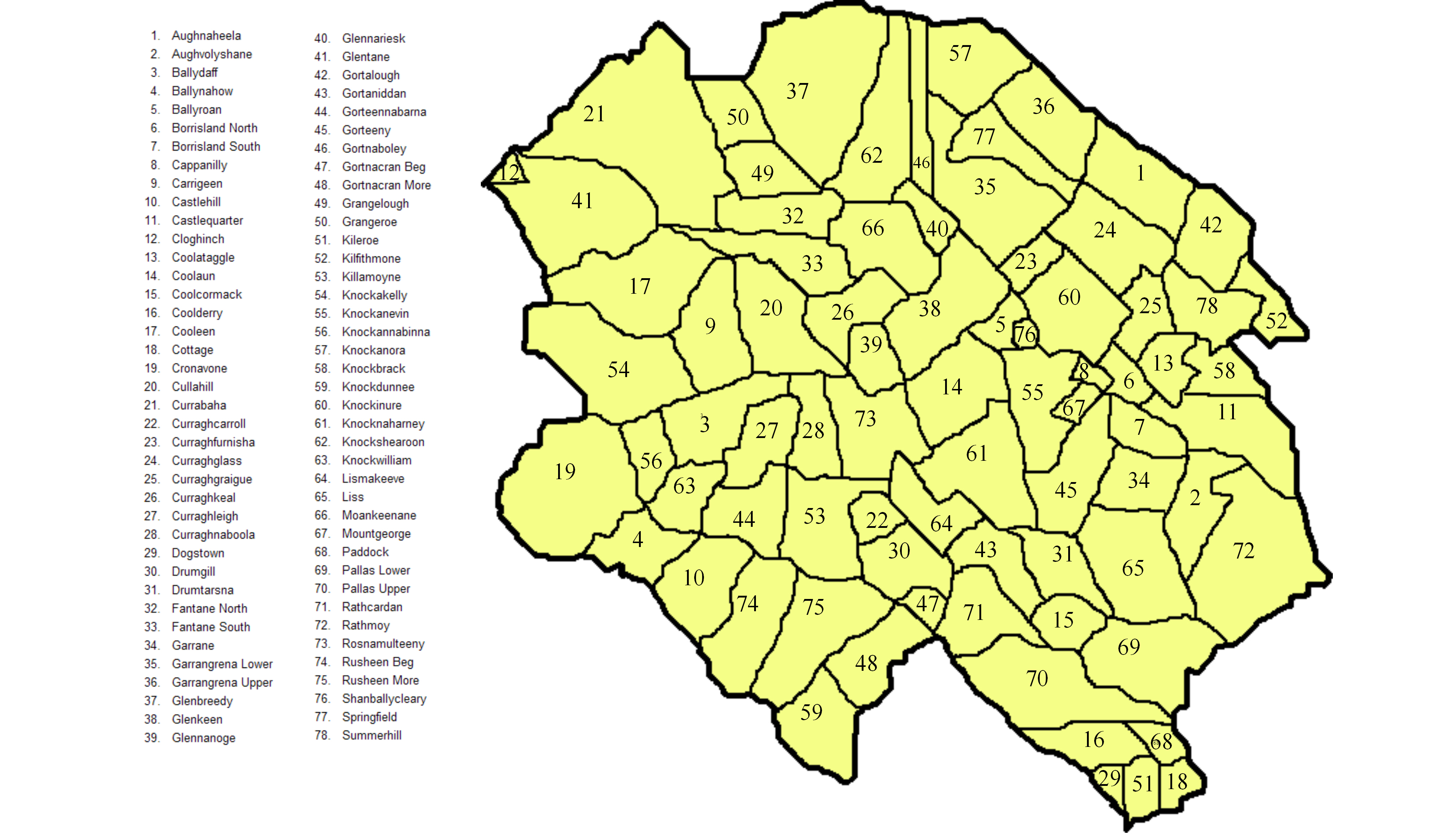
Townlands in the parish

Glenkeen or Glankeen (Irish: Gleann Caoin) is a civil parish in County Tipperary, Ireland. It is one of seven civil parishes in the barony of Kilnamanagh Upper.

The former Church of Ireland parish of Glenkeen, which was co-extensive with the civil parish, was in the diocese of Cashel (which is now part of the diocese of Cashel and Ossory) and its glebe house was in the townland of Glenkeen.

This civil parish is unusual in that, when the parish structure of the Catholic church was re-established, the resultant ecclesiastical parish, that of Borrisoleigh and Ileigh (which is part of the Roman Catholic Archdiocese of Cashel and Emly), was (and is) co-extensive with the civil parish.

The town of Borrisoleigh is located in the parish, which encompasses 14,215 statute acres and is divided into 78 townlands:

- Aughnaheela
- Aughvolyshane
- Ballydaff
- Ballynahow
- Ballyroan
- Borrisland North
- Borrisland South
- Cappanilly
- Carrigeen
- Castlehill
- Castlequarter
- Cloghinch
- Coolataggle
- Coolaun
- Coolcormack
- Coolderry
- Cooleen
- Cottage
- Cronavone
- Cullahill
- Currabaha
- Curraghcarroll
- Curraghfurnisha
- Curraghglass
- Curraghgraigue
- Curraghkeal
- Curraghleigh
- Curraghnaboola
- Dogstown
- Drumgill
- Drumtarsna
- Fantane North
- Fantane South
- Garrane
- Garrangrena Lower
- Garrangrena Upper
- Glenbreedy
- Glenkeen
- Glennanoge
- Glennariesk
- Glentane
- Gortalough
- Gortaniddan
- Gorteennabarna
- Gorteeny
- Gortnaboley
- Gortnacran Beg
- Gortnacran More
- Grangelough
- Grangeroe
- Kileroe
- Kilfithmone
- Killamoyne
- Knockakelly
- Knockanevin
- Knockannabinna
- Knockanora
- Knockbrack
- Knockdunnee
- Knockinure
- Knocknaharney
- Knockshearoon
- Knockwilliam
- Lismakeeve
- Liss
- Moankeenane
- Mountgeorge
- Paddock
- Pallas Lower
- Pallas Upper
- Rathcardan
- Rathmoy
- Rosnamulteeny
- Rusheen Beg
- Rusheen More
- Shanballycleary
- Springfield
- Summerhill
