= Mary Alice Dwyer-Dobbin =

American television executive (active 1972–?)

Mary Alice ("Mickey") Dwyer-Dobbin is an American daytime television producer.

== Biography ==
A native of St. Louis, Missouri, Dwyer-Dobbin is a television executive with experience in creative development, production, and management. Her nickname has been "Mickey" since childhood.

She was married to Leon Dobbin, an NBC executive who died in 2010 at age 92. They had one child, a son, Dean.

Dwyer-Dobbin is a graduate of Webster University, where she studied theater and speech. She earned her master's degree in theater from The Catholic University of America.

== Career ==
=== Early career ===
Dwyer-Dobbin's first television job was with Bob Stewart Productions, working on game shows, before joining Rankin/Bass Productions producing cartoons on the NBC and ABC Saturday-morning schedules. Her earliest credit is an associate producer credit, under in maiden name Mary Alice Dwyer, for the September 1972 episode "Yankee Doodle", of the animated series Festival of Family Classics. Next she landed a job developing daytime shows at ABC as well as working on ABC Afterschool Special programs. One of the shows she helped birth was Ryan's Hope. In 1976, she was promoted to director of children's programming and, that season, brought to air the Emmy-winning daytime special My Mom's Having a Baby, which the network subsequently broadcast in prime time. A year later, she moved to NBC as director of daytime and kids programming and was subsequently promoted to vice president, children's programming. Most notably, she was responsible for bringing the Smurfs to the network.

In 1981 Dwyer-Dobbin became vice president, programming, for the cable-network startup Daytime, which started broadcasting in March 1982; in 1983 it merged with the Cable Health Network, which had started broadcasting in June 1982, creating Lifetime.

At Lifetime, she was in charge of The Dr. Ruth (Westheimer) Show - a live, call-in program that broke new ground back in 1983 when it premiered, and launched candid and bubbly sex therapist Dr. Ruth Westheimer's career. She said, "There were some among us who were very nervous. There was concern that we would offend our advertisers and offend our affiliates and offend our audience. There were concerns that the subject matter, and Dr. Ruth`s explicitness, just might be too much. Now that she`s been on the air a year, I think we could count on the fingers of one hand the number of complaints we`ve gotten. America has taken her to its heart.

=== Daytime television ===
Dwyer-Dobbin returned to ABC Daytime as head of east coast programs in 1986 and soon became executive in charge of all programming and development for the division. Dennis Swanson, to whom she reported from 1991 to 1993 said about Dwyer-Dobbin, "Mickey is tireless, hands-on, tough, and fun to work with. She has an energy and a creative level that were unsurpassed." ABC's daytime had been slipping when he took it over, and he gave her "a lot of credit" for getting it back on track.

In 1996, Dwyer-Dobbin was hired by Procter and Gamble Productions to be their head of production for their daytime dramas: Guiding Light, As The World Turns and Another World, replacing veteran production head Kenneth Fitts in that capacity. (Unlike most daytime shows, which are owned either partly or wholly by their creators or the network, Procter and Gamble acted as a supplier of the show to the networks, and had a substantial say in how they were produced.) Dwyer-Dobbin remained head of the P&G soaps for several years, and also served briefly as executive producer of Guiding Light while it sought a new executive producer.

On September 6, 2005, Dwyer-Dobbin announced plans to vacate her position the following month at the end of her contract. Procter & Gamble decided not to name a successor, saying that they would leave creative decisions to their programs' executive producers, Christopher Goutman and Ellen Wheeler. Dwyer-Dobbin continued as an industry consultant and as a guest speaker for women's groups and in academia.

== Awards and recognition ==
- Daytime Emmy Award for Children's Informational nominee (1979, 1980)
- CableACE Award winner (1982)
- Honorary PhD from Webster University, Doctor of Humane Letters (2011)
- Inducted into National Academy of Television Arts and Sciences Silver Circle

Preceded by Kenneth L. Fitts	Executive in Charge of Production for PGP soap operas 1996-2005	Succeeded by Position Abolished
