= Tipperary Natural Mineral Water =

Irish mineral water brand

- Country: Ireland
- Produced by: C&C Group
- Introduced: 1986; 40 years ago
- Source: Clonmel
- Type: still
- pH: 7.2
- Calcium (Ca): 71
- Chloride (Cl): 20
- Magnesium (Mg): 13
- Nitrate (NO_{3}): 14
- Potassium (K): 1
- Sodium (Na): 20
- Sulfate (SO_{4}): 18
- TDS: 346
- Website: http://www.tipperary-water.ie
- All concentrations in milligrams per liter (mg/L); pH without units

Tipperary Natural Mineral Water is an Irish brand of mineral water coming from a source at Annerville, Clonmel, County Tipperary, Ireland. Tipperary Water is part of C&C Group, an Irish-owned multinational company.

== History ==
Tipperary Natural Mineral Water Company was founded in 1986 by Nicholas and Patrick Cooney. The water is pumped from a depth of 100 metres. In 1987, Tipperary Natural Mineral Water was the first Irish bottled water to qualify for the European Union's Natural Mineral Water status. In 2012, C&C Group acquired Gleeson Group for €12.4m. In 2016, seeking to cut costs C&C closed the water-bottling plant in Borrisoleigh which employed 140 staff. Production was moved to Clonmel County Tipperary.

In 2019 the former Borrisoleigh water-bottling plant was sold to Oscar Wilde Water, a company owned by entrepreneur John Hegarty.
