= E. B. Dwyer =

Australian cricketer

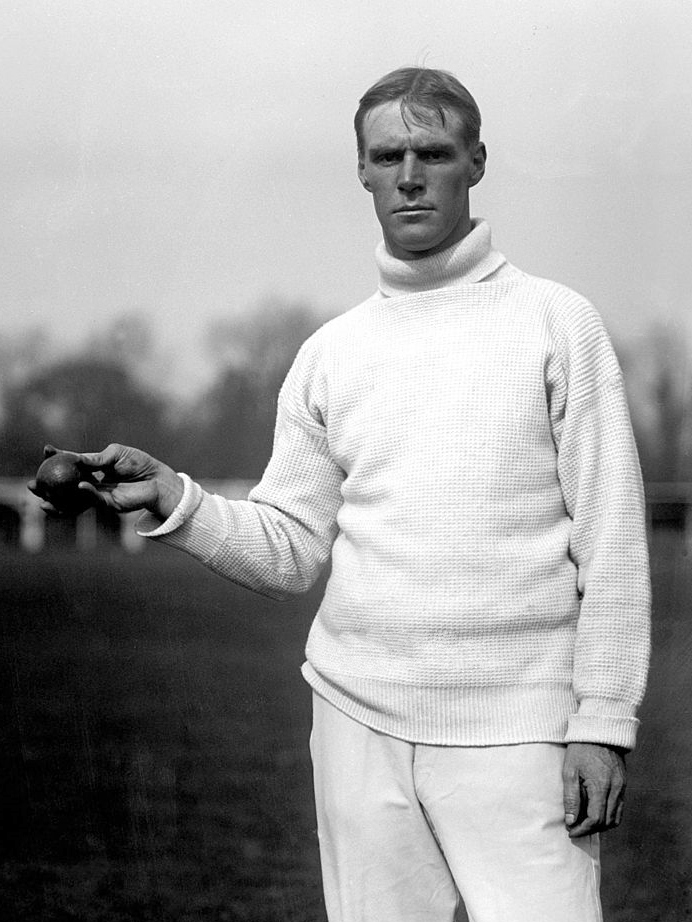

Personal information
- Full name: John Elicius Benedict Bernard Placid Quirk Carrington Dwyer
- Born: 3 May 1876; Redfern, New South Wales, Australia
- Died: 19 October 1912 (aged 36); Crewe, Cheshire, England
- Batting: Right-handed
- Bowling: Right-arm fast-medium
- Role: Bowler

Domestic team information
- Years: Team
- 1904–1909: Sussex
- First-class debut: 20 June 1904 Sussex v Cambridge University
- Last First-class: 21 June 1909 Sussex v Cambridge University

Career statistics
Competition	First-class
Matches	61
Runs scored	986
Batting average	11.87
100s/50s	0/2
Top score	63*
Balls bowled	9321
Wickets	179
Bowling average	27.94
5 wickets in innings	10
10 wickets in match	2
Best bowling	9/35
Catches/stumpings	21/0
- Source: CricketArchive, 8 November 2011

John Elicius Benedict Bernard Placid Quirk Carrington Dwyer (3 May 1876 – 19 October 1912), better known as E. B. Dwyer, was an Australian cricketer who played first-class cricket in England for Sussex County Cricket Club.

Dwyer was born in Redfern, a suburb of Sydney, Australia. His great-grandfather was Michael Dwyer, from Wicklow in Ireland, a leader of the Irish Rebellion of 1798. He fought a guerrilla campaign until he surrendered in December 1803, and was transported to Australia in 1805.

Dwyer played cricket in Australia for Redfern Wednesday Cricket Club and then for Redfern Cricket Club. He was tall, and played mainly as a right-arm fast-medium bowler, using his height and a high right-arm bowling action to produce lift and turn. Plum Warner encouraged him to play in England, where he arrived in early 1904.

CB Fry persuaded him to play for Sussex. After playing a few matches for Sussex in 1904 and 1905, he became a regular member of the team from 1906, playing in 61 first-class matches for Sussex between 1904 and 1909, taking 179 wickets at a bowling average of 27.94. He took 9 wickets for 35 runs against Derbyshire at Hove in 1906 (and 16 for 100 in the match). He was less successful as a batsman. He made two half-centuries, but his first-class batting average was only 11.87. He made his best score, 63, against Surrey at Brighton in 1906. He was dropped from the Sussex team after 1909 when his form declined. He died in Crewe, where he was playing cricket for the season.

== See also ==
- A.R.R.A.P.W.R.R.K.B. Amunugama
