= R601 road (Ireland) =

Road in County Cork, Ireland

Coordinates: 51.643091°N 8.753856°W

R601 road
- Bóthar R601
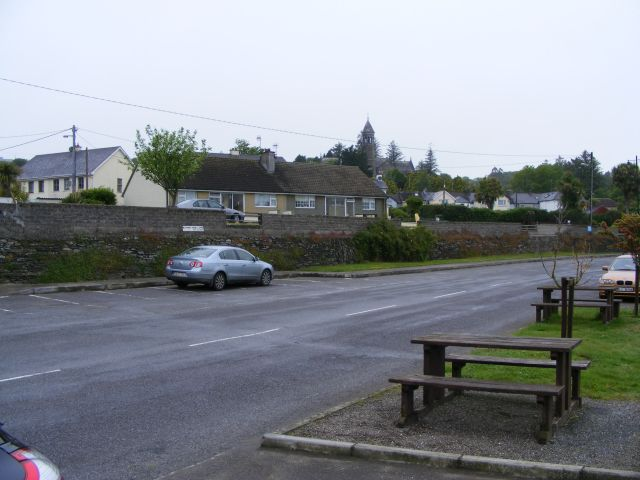
- Church Road, Timoleague, on the R601

Route information
- Length: 4.7 km (2.9 mi)

Major junctions
- From: R600 Timoleague
- Crosses River Arigideen
- To: Courtmacsherry

Location
- Country: Ireland

Highway system
- Roads in Ireland; Motorways; Primary; Secondary; Regional

The R601 road, also called the Timoleague–Courtmacsherry Road, is a regional road in Ireland, located in County Cork.
