= Glenkeen (townland) =

Townland in County Tipperary, Ireland

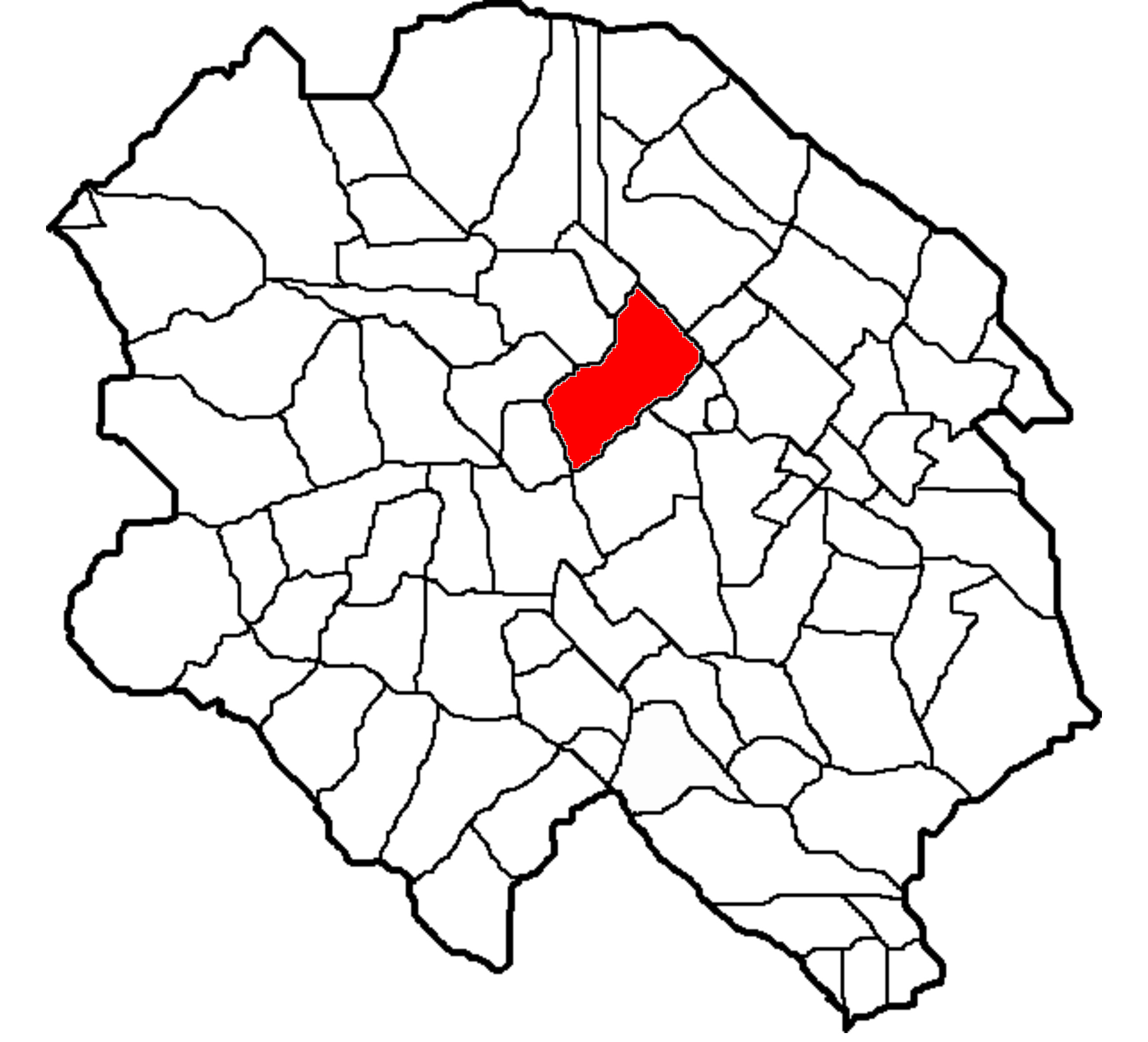
Location of the townland within the parish

Glenkeen is a townland in the civil parish of the same name in County Tipperary, Ireland.

The glebe house for the Church of Ireland parish of Glenkeen was located in this townland and had a glebe of 11 acres. The glebe house was built in 1785, a few years after the construction of a Church of Ireland parish church in the nearby town of Borrisoleigh. After this church was closed, the glebe house was sold in 1870 to a Martin Ryan, an ancestor of the present-day owners.
