= Dwyre =

Dwyre is a surname. Notable people with the surname include:

- Bill Dwyre (born 1944), American columnist
- Jesse Aaron Dwyre, Canadian actor, musician, and writer

== See also ==
- Dwyer (name)
- O'Dwyer (surname)
