= R504 road (Ireland) =

Regional road in Ireland

R504 road
- Bóthar R504

Route information
- Length: 7 km (4.3 mi)

Location
- Country: Ireland
- Primary destinations: County Tipperary; Birdhill; R503 at Shower Cross

Highway system
- Roads in Ireland; Motorways; Primary; Secondary; Regional

The R504 road is a regional road in Ireland which runs north-south from Birdhill to its junction with the R503 at Shower Cross, one kilometre west of the town of Newport, all in County Tipperary. En route it passes through Clery's Cross and Barna Cross, and crosses over the M7 motorway.

The road is 7 km (4.3 mi) long.

== See also ==
- Roads in Ireland
- National primary road
- National secondary road
