= Ileigh =

Ileigh Church
- Location within Ireland
- 52°44′39.56″N 7°59′30.58″W
- Location: County Tipperary North
- Country: Ireland
- Denomination: Roman Catholic

Architecture
- Functional status: Active
- Completed: 1826

Administration
- Parish: Borrisoleigh and Ileigh

Ileigh (sometimes written Ileagh) is in North Tipperary.

It is the site of a Catholic church, built in 1826, which is one of the churches in the ecclesiastical parish of Borrisoleigh and Ileigh. An earlier church on the site was dated 1758. The current building is regarded as representative of the modest form of Catholic churches in Ireland before Catholic Emancipation in 1829. It is cruciform, with four-bay elevations to the nave, a single-bay chancel, a single-bay sacristy and two-bay transepts. The pitched roof is covered with artificial slates. The south transept has an ashlar limestone belfry with cross finial. The walls are rendered and the openings have pointed-arches with limestone sills and stained glass windows. The doorway is round-arched with a chamfered surround and timber panelled double doors with a date plaque above. The boundary walls are of random stone but the gate piers are of ashlar sandstone, supporting cast-iron gates.
