= Dolla, County Tipperary =

Dolla An Doladh
- Village
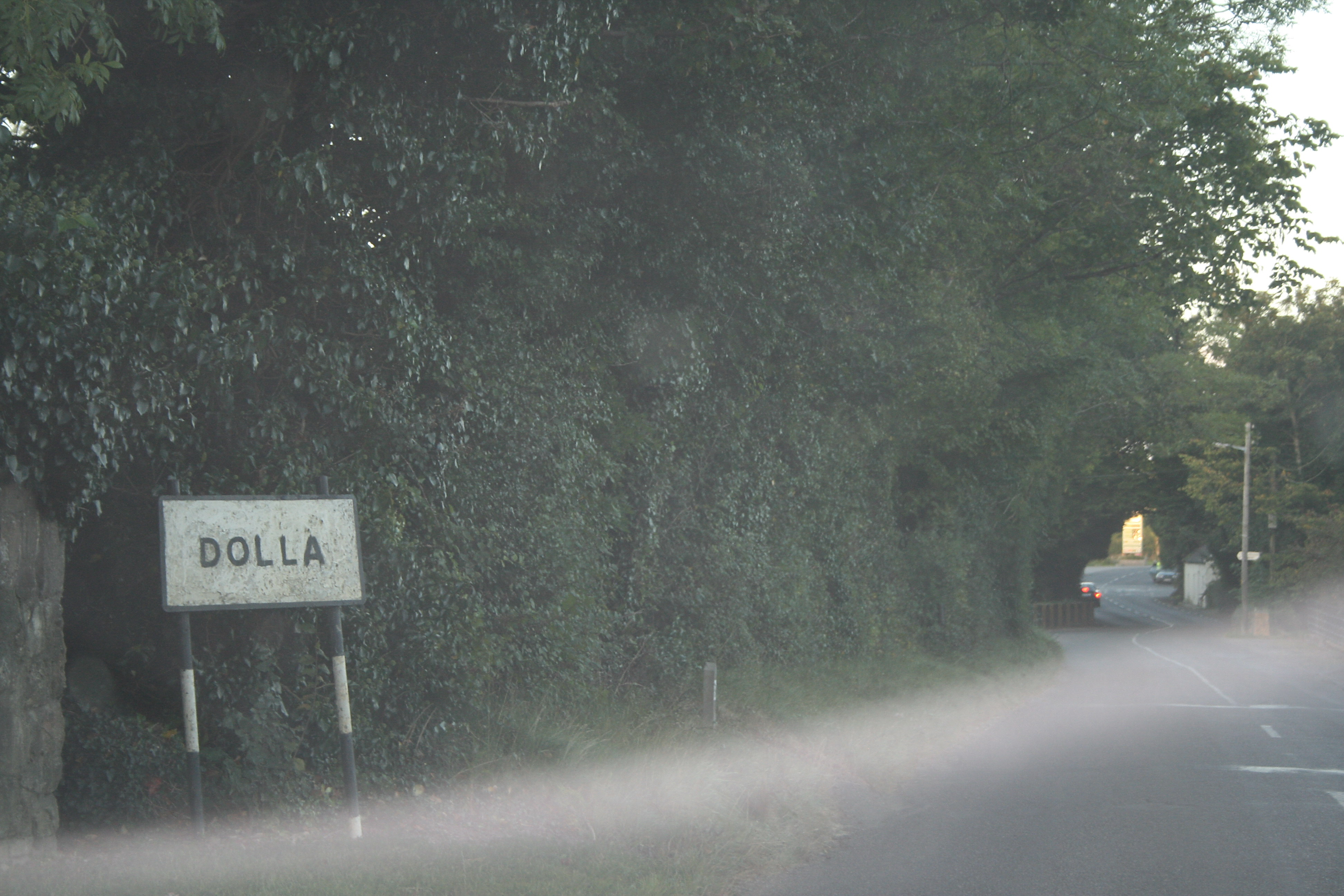
- Dolla welcome sign

- Location in Ireland
- Coordinates: 52°47′52″N 8°11′25″W
- Country: Ireland
- Province: Munster
- County: County Tipperary
- Time zone: UTC+0 (WET)
  - Summer (DST): UTC-1 (IST (WEST))

Dolla (Irish: An Doladh) is a village in County Tipperary, Ireland, at the crossroads of the R497 and R499 regional roads. It is located at the foot of the northern flank of the Silvermine Mountains, 8 km (5 mi) south of Nenagh. The village is in a civil parish of the same name.

Services in Dolla include a public house, petrol station, shop-pub and a post office. The Silvermines GAA Club pitch and club house are also located in Dolla.

The Garda Station is a protected structure under the County Development Plan. The structure was a former RIC barracks and was built c. 1890. The structure is the oldest building within the settlement boundary.

== Notable people ==
- Sean Mackey, engineer
- Martin Ryan, publican

== See also ==
- List of towns and villages in Ireland
