= R500 road (Ireland) =

Road in Ireland

R500 road
- Bóthar R500
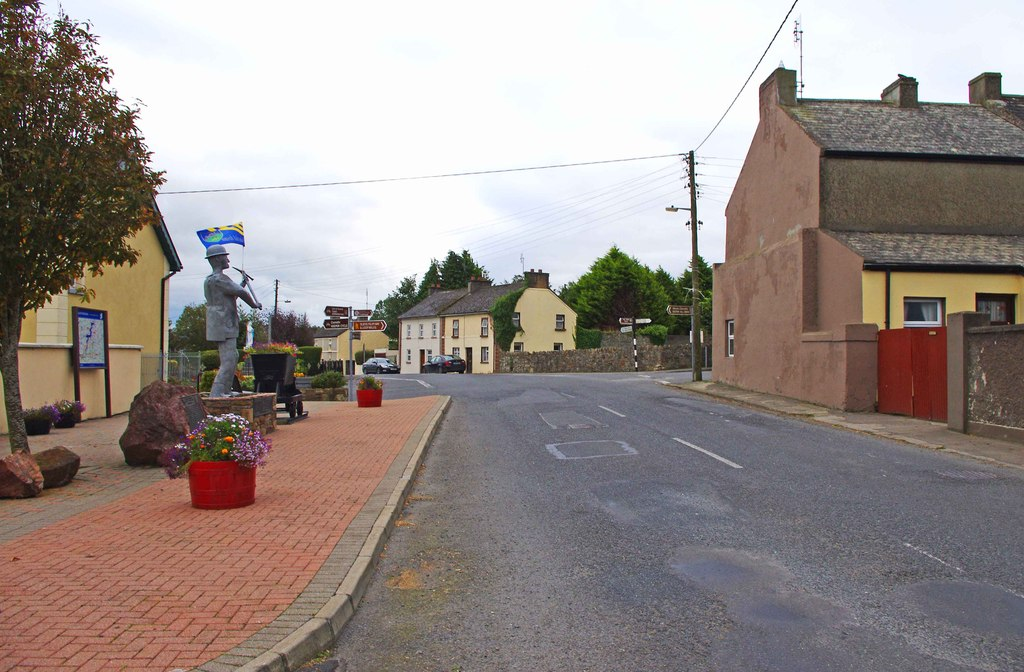
- Junction with R499 in Silvermines

Route information
- Length: 9 km (5.6 mi)

Location
- Country: Ireland
- Primary destinations: County Tipperary; Nenagh - Starts at junction with R497; Terminates at junction with the R499

Highway system
- Roads in Ireland; Motorways; Primary; Secondary; Regional

The R500 is a regional road in County Tipperary running south west from Nenagh to a junction with the R499 road at Silvermines. The road is approximately 9 km (5.6 mi) long.

== See also ==
- Roads in Ireland - (Primary National Roads)
- Secondary Roads
- Regional Roads
