= PK Dwyer =

American singer-songwriter

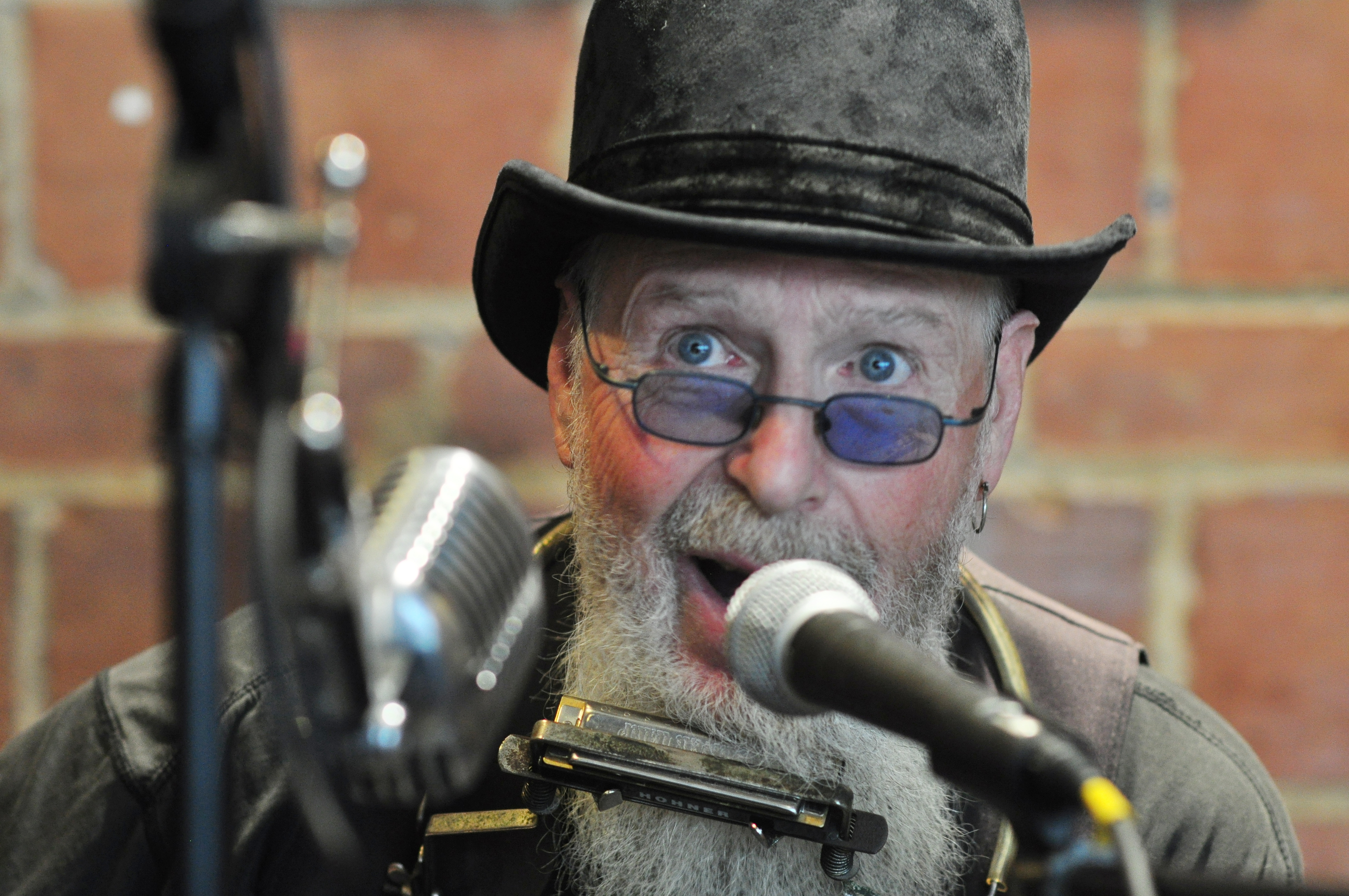
PK Dwyer, 2016

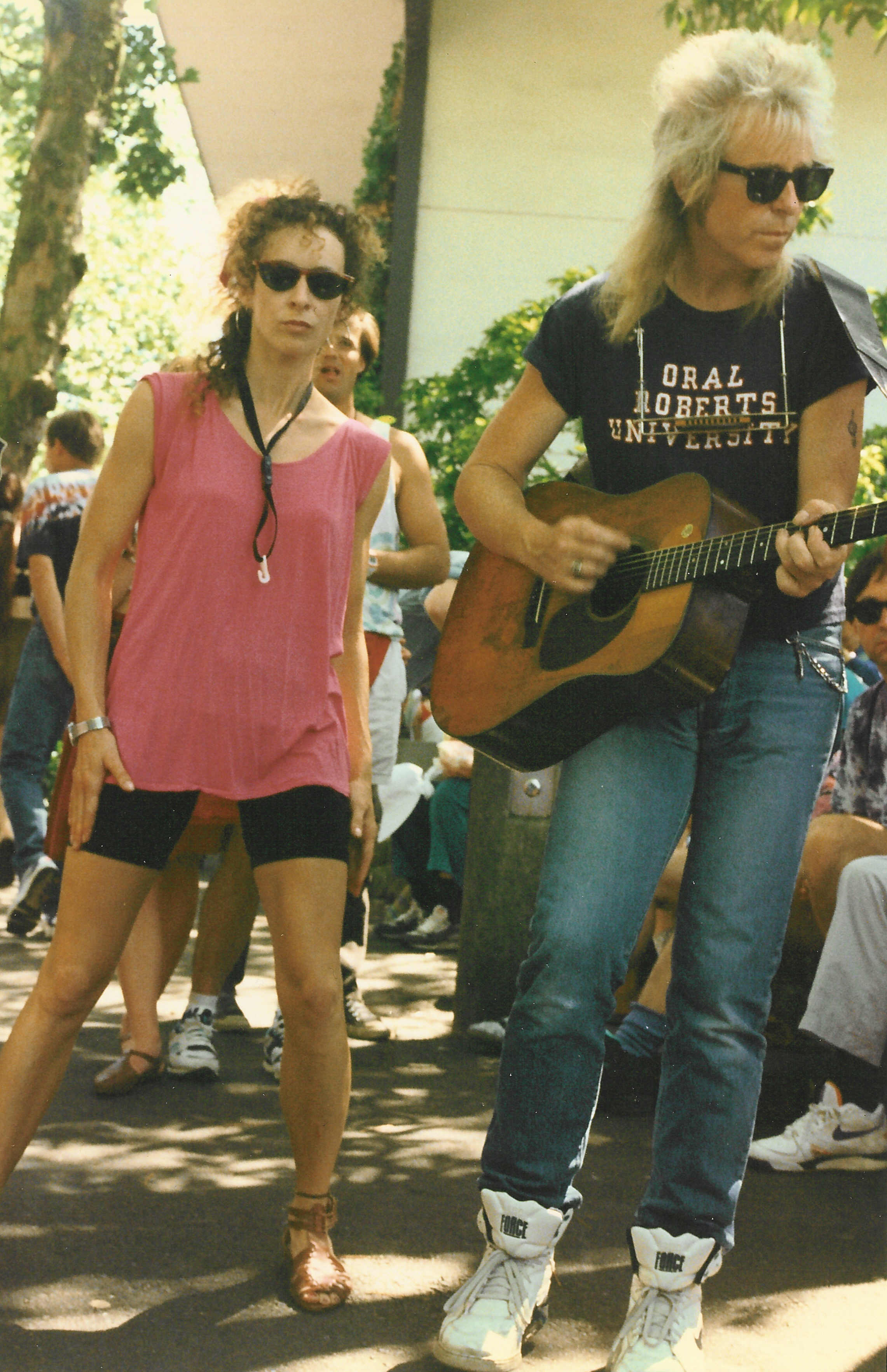
Dwyer (right), busking at Northwest Folklife Festival, Seattle, 1992.

PK Dwyer (born in Mill Valley, California, December 28, 1949 - April 15, 2024) was an American musician specializing in Jump blues.

He has also worked under the names Kevin Dwyer, Hollywood Dick Doll, and George Michael Jackson and is credited with forming the first-ever street band to busk at Pike Place Market, Seattle, Washington. He formed that band, Felix & the Freelicks, shortly after arriving in the Pacific Northwest in 1971. The band evolved into various other alignments, including (successively) The Jitters, Throbbing Gems, the Royal Famille du Caniveaux / Gutter People of Paris, all of whom played at the Market and in many other venues.

Dwyer has also lived in Los Angeles, Paris, the Smoky Mountains of North Carolina, and New York City. In 1970, Dwyer, then a street musician in Los Angeles wrote and recorded music for the film Walk The Walk, directed by Jac Zacha. Soon after that he moved to Seattle and began performing on the streets and in the clubs with partner Donna Beck. He was a founding member and featured performer in a number of bands, including Felix & the Freelicks, the Dynamic Logs, self-described "cow punk" quintet The Jitters, Throbbing Gems, Royal Famille du Caniveaux / Gutter People of Paris, and the Hollywood Dick Doll Revue.

Dwyer won the First Annual Street Performers Competition in Paris in 1981. Shortly after that, in New York his controversial cabaret act The Hollywood Dick Doll Revue won praise from Suzanne Vega, Dave Van Ronk, and Richie Havens. Havens signed Dwyer to his production company in 1983.

In 1989, Seattle label PopLlama released Dwyer's album George Michael Jackson: King Of Gonzo Folk.

Since 2000, Dwyer has focused on blues, claiming inspiration from "the ghost of Jimmy Reed." Vintage Guitar magazine (November 2004) called his 2003 album Blues Guy Now "a modern blues masterpiece". His songs "Lookin' For A Woman", "Time To Try", "Celebration Blues", and "No Longer My Girlfriend" were featured on episodes of MTV's reality show MADE.

== Discography ==
- "Dandy Annie"/"Drawbridge" (1976, single)
- The Jitters—The Jitters (Nervine Music, 1980, LP)
- After All It IS 1980 (1980, LP)
- The Dynamic Logs—The Vinyl Reunion (Dynamic Log Records, 1985, LP)
- George Michael Jackson: King Of Gonzo Folk (Popllama, 1989, LP)
- How Can I Go Wrong (1994, CD)
- Get Well (1997, CD)
- PK Dwyer & The Lowdown Payments (1999, CD)
- Up To My Balls In The Blues (King Pin Head, 2001, CD)
- Blues Guy Now (King Pin Head, 2003, CD)
- Healed (King Pin Head, 2006, CD)
