= R663 road (Ireland) =

Regional road in Ireland

R663 road
- Bóthar R663
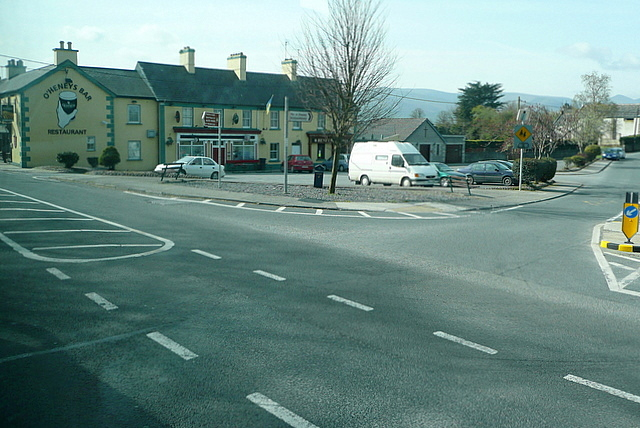
- N24 in Bansha, at junction with R663

Route information
- Length: 23.7 km (14.7 mi)

Major junctions
- From: N24 at Bansha, County Tipperary
- R664 at Newtown; Enter County Limerick; R662 at Galbally
- To: R513 at Newtown, County Limerick

Location
- Country: Ireland

Highway system
- Roads in Ireland; Motorways; Primary; Secondary; Regional
← R662	→ R664

The R663 road is a regional road in Ireland. It travels from the N24 road in Bansha, County Tipperary to the R513 in County Limerick, via the Glen of Aherlow and Galbally. The road is 23.7 kilometres (14.7 mi) long.
