= R664 road (Ireland) =

Road in County Tipperary, Ireland

Coordinates: 52.470583°N 8.160869°W

R664 road
- Bóthar R664
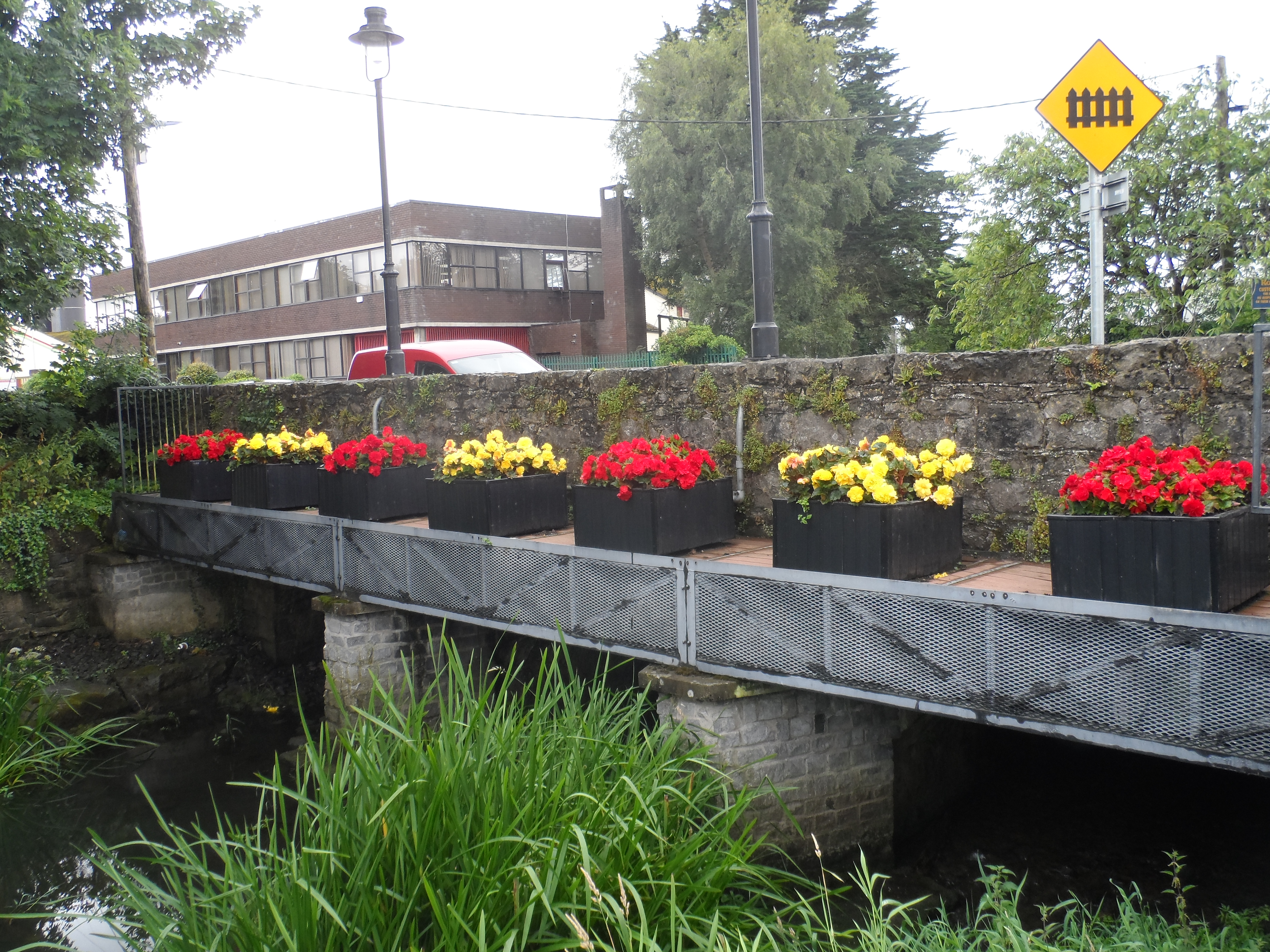
- Bridge over the River Ara on Station Road, Tipperary (R664)

Route information
- Length: 9.0 km (5.6 mi)

Major junctions
- From: N24 / R497 at Main Street, Tipperary
- Crosses River Ara; Crosses Limerick–Rosslare railway line
- To: R663 at Newtown/Gortavoher West (Coach Road Inn)

Location
- Country: Ireland

Highway system
- Roads in Ireland; Motorways; Primary; Secondary; Regional
← R663	→ R665

The R664 road is a regional road in County Tipperary, Ireland.

It runs from Tipperary's main street southwards, crossing the River Ara and the railway line before meeting the R663 (Bansha–Garryspillane road).
