= Tipperary Excel =

- Amharclann Excel, Tiobraid Árann
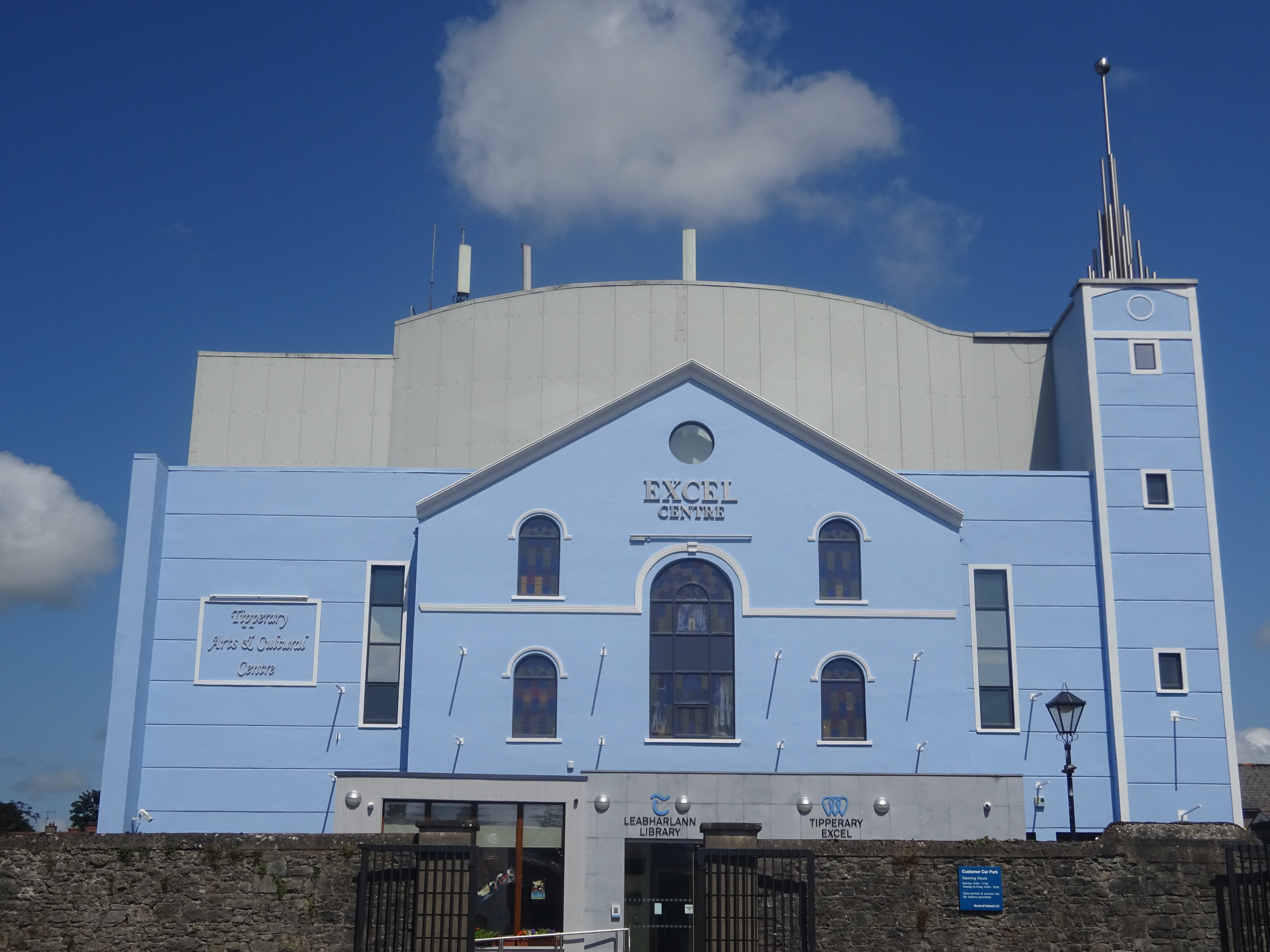
- Excel Centre in 2021

- Location within Ireland
- Address: Mitchell Street
- Location: Tipperary, County Tipperary, Ireland
- Coordinates: 52.474841°N 8.159888°W
- Owner: Tipperary Excel Heritage Co. Ltd
- Capacity: 377 (Simon Ryan Theatre)
- Public transit: Bus: Tipperary (Abbey Street); Rail: Tipperary halt
- Parking: Market Yard car park

Construction
- Opened: 5 May 2001
- Cost: €6.6 million

Website
- tipperary-excel.com

Tipperary Excel is an arts and cultural centre located in Tipperary, Ireland, opened in 2001.

== History ==
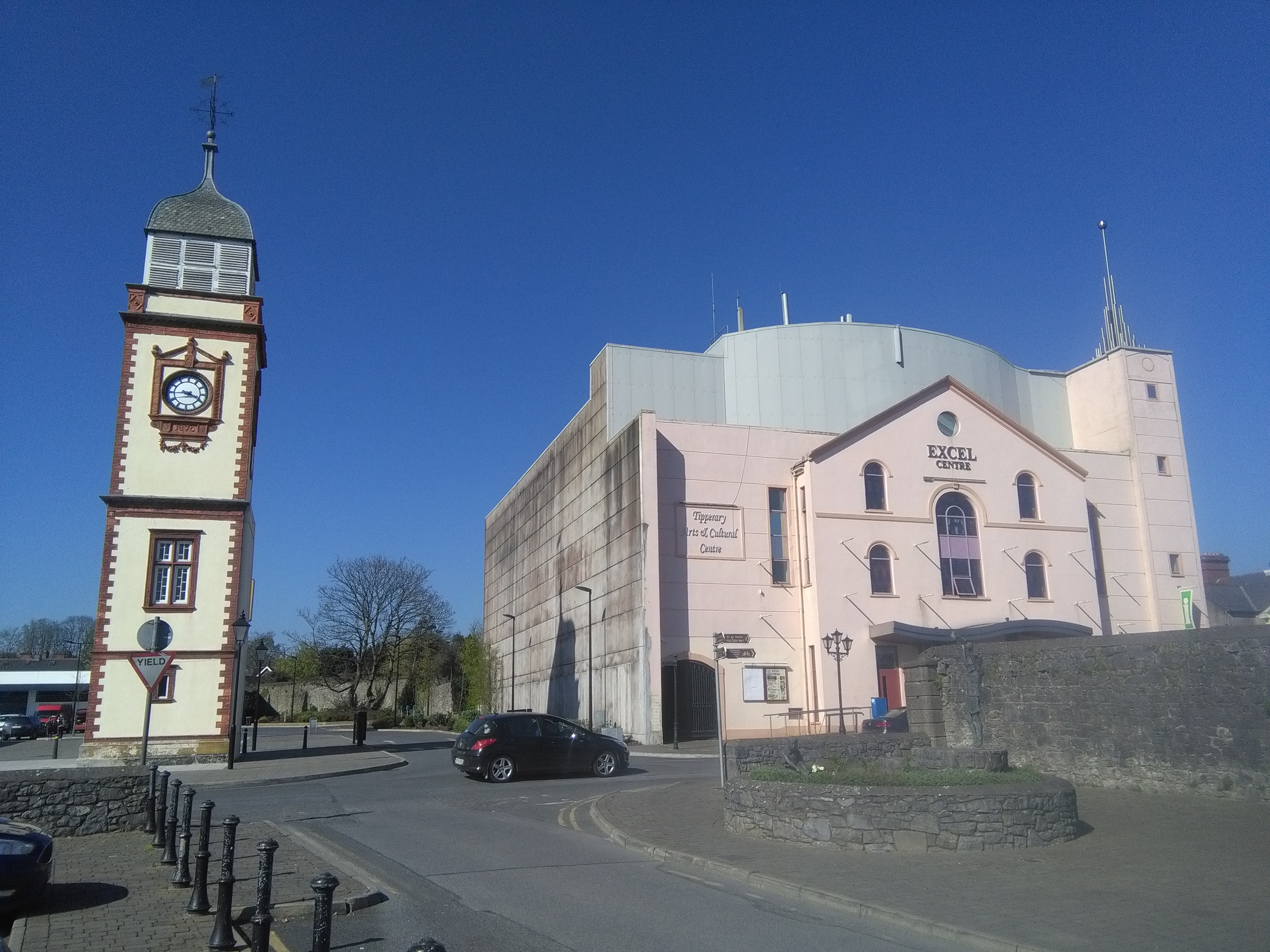
The Excel in 2017, with the old clock tower nearby

The Excel was opened by then-Taoiseach Bertie Ahern on 5 May 2001. Its theatre is named after Simon Ryan (died 2011), a brother of Tony Ryan and a longtime promoter of amateur theatre.

Tipperary Excel Youth Theatre Group holds an annual play, and productions touring Ireland regularly play at the Excel.

During the COVID-19 pandemic, the Excel was used as a courthouse.

In 2022, Gemma Hayes performed a show at the Excel for Mabon, an autumn equinox festival.

It was refurbished in 2023.

== Facilities ==
The Excel comprises the Simon Ryan Theatre, cinemas, an art gallery, tourism office, interpretative centre, Internet café and a genealogy research centre. It also hosts a dance school.

The Simon Ryan Theatre has a stage measuring 40 x 27 feet (12 x 8 m). The proscenium arch is 33 feet (10 m) wide and 18 ft 7 in (5.6 m) high.
