= Shronell =

Shronell Srónaill
- Civil parish
- Location within Ireland
- Coordinates: 52°28′N 8°14′W
- Country: Ireland
- County: County Tipperary
- Barony: Clanwilliam
- Irish grid reference: R839357

Shronell, Shrone Hill, or Shronel (Irish: Srónaill) is a civil parish and townland near the villages of Lattin and Emly in County Tipperary, Ireland. It is situated 3 miles southwest of Tipperary town on the R515 regional road.

== Name ==
The English word "Shronell" derives from the Irish language placename "Srónaill". Srónaill, meaning the end or nose (from the Irish srón) of a hill or ridge, may refer to a steep hill north of the cemetery. The electoral division of Shronell includes the townlands of Shronell, Shronell Beg (from the Irish beag, meaning small) and Shronell More (from mór meaning big).

== Geography ==
The area contains pasture land that is used primarily for dairy farming. The Galtee Mountains are visible from most of the area. The townland is in the ecclesiastical parish of Lattin/Cullen and the school's Gaelic Athletic Association and religious affiliations are concentrated in Lattin.

== History ==
Joseph Damer (1630–1720), an officer in Oliver Cromwell's New Model Army, was granted lands in Shronell in 1662. There were concerted efforts made by the Damer family to introduce Protestant workers from the northern counties, and by 1766 there were eighty-two Protestant families in Shronell. In 1837, the parish, (sometimes spelled Shronehill) in the barony of Clanwilliam, contained a total of 1006 inhabitants and encompassed the townlands of Ballinglanna, Ballycohy, Ballyconry, Barronstown (Ormond), Shronell Beg and Shronell More. It consisted of 2,747 statute acres (1,113 hectares), some of which was cultivated but mostly in pasture. 'Ballinard' was the residence of W. Chadwick. Other notable residents in the 1830s included Clement Sadler of 'Damerville', Austin Cooper of 'Chadwickand' and Rev. M. Clarkethe of the glebe house. The Church of Ireland (Protestant) parish was in the diocese of Cashel.

== Notable buildings ==
The local Church of Ireland (Anglican) church was built about 1808, and the tower added in 1818. There was a school-house, though not in use, partly built by Caroline Damer, who also endowed it with an acre of land. Damerville Court was built in the mid 18th century by John Damer, and is marked as a "ruin" in maps since at least the 19th century. These ruins lie behind the present Shronell National School.

== Folklore ==
A number of folktales from the area relate to the Damer family. In one of these tales, it is said that a local Irish language bard, Liam Dall Ó hIfearnáin (1720-1803), wrote that the Damer family would not survive in the Shronel district but that the Irish Heffernan (Ó hIfearnáin) clan would.

Damer's Court in Shronel was never fully finished. It is said locally that it was destroyed by those angry at Damer's misery at being surrounded by the poor of West Tipperary. What remained of the family fortune passed to Lady Caroline Damer, his daughter and sole heir, and later to the Earl of Portarlington. The large mansion was demolished in 1776, and by the mid 19th century, little remained but the offices, which were by then in a "state of dilapidation".

== People ==
- Marshal James Clarke, born on 24 October 1841.
