= Bansha =

Bansha An Bháinseach
- Village
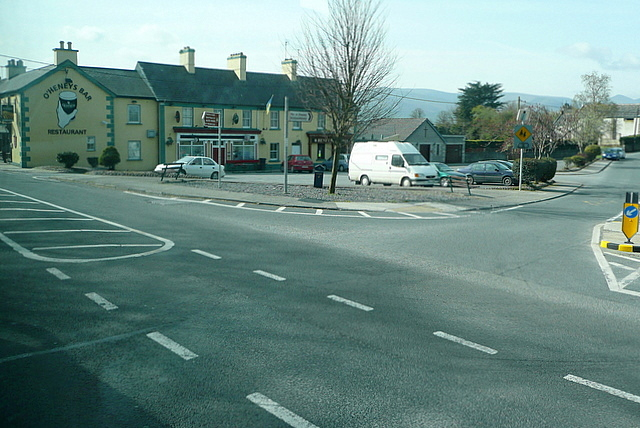
- Main Street

- Location in Ireland
- Coordinates: 52°27′N 8°04′W
- Country: Ireland
- Province: Munster
- County: County Tipperary
- Elevation: 68 m (223 ft)

Population (2016)
  - Total: 333

Bansha (/ˈbɑːnʃə/; Irish: An Bháinseach) is a village in County Tipperary in Ireland. The village is part of the parish of "Bansha and Kilmoyler" (united in 1858) in the Roman Catholic Archdiocese of Cashel and Emly. It is in the historical barony of Clanwilliam. Bansha is co-extensive with the pre-Reformation parish of Templeneiry of which the townland name of Templenahurney is thought to be a corruption. While the village is the focal point of the area, there is also an outlying hamlet in the parish, located at Rossadrehid where a rural creamery once serviced the dairy industry.

== Location ==
Bansha is located on the National Primary Route (N24) linking the cities of Limerick and Waterford and is eight kilometres south-east of Tipperary Town and thirteen kilometres north-west of Cahir. The village is strategically located on the eastern approaches to the Glen of Aherlow, which forms a large part of the parish as do the Galtee Mountains (spelt Galty Mountains on Ordnance Survey maps), which has the highest inland mountain peak in Ireland, Galtymore (917 metres, or 3,009 ft). The Roman Catholic Parish Church of the Annunciation, built in 1807, is centrally located in the village as is the Church of Ireland, for the parish of Templeneiry, known to be in use from 1718 but now closed as unviable because of a reduced local congregation. However, the building which has an imposing spire, erected in 1814, is used for community purposes and the surrounding graveyard is still used for burials by the old families of the area. Bansha is located in the Golden Vale and the surrounding land is some of the finest in Ireland due to its natural limestone bedrock. The River Ara flows by the village, through the Deer Park of the old Lismacue demesne. The railway line from Limerick to Waterford also passes through, though the railway station which opened on 1 May 1852, was closed on 9 September 1963 as part of the rationalisation policy of the national railway company, Córas Iompair Éireann. Tipperary railway station, around 8 km. away, is now the nearest railway station. Bansha is served by Bus Éireann route 55.

== History ==
The names Bansha and Kilmoyler do not appear ancient records but instead, this area was divided into different ecclesiastical administrations. The modern parish of Bansha & Kilmoyler comprises the whole of the two Civil Parishes of Templeneiry and Clonbullogue, and also parts of the four parishes of Killardry, Relickmurry & Athassel, Kilshane and Cordangan. The Papal Taxation records of 1291 record Templeneiry and Clonbullogue as Nachrich and Clonhalke, Archbishop O'Hedian (1437) names them as Naryt and Clonbolygg. Bansha village is thought to be an ancient settlement and its main geographical features and landed gentry of the surrounding area were vividly described by Samuel Lewis in his Topographical Dictionary of Ireland, published in 1837. Historically, it was a small compact village comprising two streets and two lanes - Main Street and Barrack Street with adjacent Banner's Lane (named after the Rev. Benjamin Holford Banner, the Church of Ireland rector of the Parish of Templeneiry) and Cooke's Lane which was a small enclave off Main Street, named after a member of the Cooke Family of Cordangan Manor, who lived here.

The Station Road from Bansha Bridge (over the River Ara) to Bansha railway station had strategic importance for about a century as it was the commercial artery connecting the village to both the station and the creamery which was the centre of activity each morning as trains arrived on one side of the road and busy creamery activity on the other side gave a vibrancy that has now been lost with the closure of both. The village expanded towards the end of the 20th century when the "Galtee View" residential area was developed in the Glebe close to the old Village Mill.

Further expansion took place in the early 21st century when "Master Horgan's Field" adjacent to the northern boundary of the old graveyard was developed as a modern residential quarter. In earlier decades, the site was owned by Mr Peter Horgan, a native of Kilmichael, County Cork, a place which won fame as the site of the famous ambush of the same name which took place there during the War of Independence, a fact of which the old master was very proud. Mr Horgan was the long-time Principal of Bansha Boys National School in succession to Masters Pat Leahy and David Dee and also managed his own public house in Barrack Street. He also grew his own sallies on the river bank within the confines of his riverside garden, now sadly no more. These sallies made an occasional appearance in class and were an effective deterrent to wayward pupils. Nonetheless, he was a much-loved character, reminiscent of Oliver Goldsmith's "Village Schoolmaster". The only buildings on the site prior to development were the village telephone exchange erected in the 1960s and the "Farmers Hall", a wooden building of fragile construction, which was erected in the mid 20th century by the young farmers association in the parish which was a precursor of Macra na Feirme. It was used for dancing, variety shows, "pongo" which was a form of modern-day bingo and on Sunday afternoons up to about 1962, as a rendezvous by locals who wished to tune into the commentary of major hurling and football matches relayed from Croke Park on Radio Éireann. The building endured until the 1960s when because of dilapidation, it was eventually closed, after which the Parochial Hall became the sole entertainment centre for the village and surrounding area.

== Muintir na Tíre ==
Bansha came to national prominence when The V. Rev. John Canon Hayes, founder of Muintir na Tíre, was appointed parish priest of Bansha & Kilmoyler in 1946. Due largely to Canon Hayes's endeavours, a factory - Bansha Rural Industries - was started and enjoyed some success producing preservatives for the Irish home market. At that time also, Bansha was to the forefront in developing many Muintir na Tíre initiatives and for a time in the 1950s enjoyed the sobriquet of The Model Parish. While Bansha still relies mainly on an agricultural economy where dairying is the main preoccupation, many of its residents are employed in industry and commerce in neighbouring towns such as Tipperary, Cahir, and Clonmel, to where they commute on a daily basis. He was succeeded as chairman of Muintir na Tire by local man very Rev. Maurice Morrissey of Dromline.

== Parliamentary tradition ==
Despite its small size, two Bansha natives have represented County Tipperary in different parliaments. John Cullinan, a member of the National League and a Gaelic Athletic Association activist in its earliest years, was a Nationalist Member of Parliament at Westminster from 1900 until he was defeated at the election of 1918 when Sinn Féin ousted the Irish Parliamentary Party in most constituencies.

Michael Ferris was a TD in Dáil Éireann from 1989 until his death on parliamentary business in Lisbon on 20 March 2000 at the age of 69. Overall, he had over twenty years of service in the Oireachtas (parliament), having been elected to Seanad Éireann for the first time on 23 April 1975. He was a member of the Labour Party and a prominent spokesman on agricultural matters and social affairs. As a public representative, he was following in the footsteps of his grandfather, Patrick Ferris, who was a member of the Tipperary (SR) County Council in the early years of the 20th century.

Séamus Ryan, a native of Deerpark, in nearby Kilfeacle, was a member of the Irish Senate—Seanad Éireann— before his death in 1933. Mr. Ryan and his wife, Agnes Harding of Solohead opened their first retail shop in Parnell Street, Dublin in 1918, known as the Monument Creamery. They specialised in the sale of dairy products and quickly developed their business to include a chain of over thirty restaurants and shops in Dublin over the next four decades. After Mr. Ryan's death, his widow carried on and indeed expanded the business. Their daughter was the Hollywood actress, Kathleen Ryan who starred in many movies in the 1940s and 1950s and their son John was an artist and man of letters who wrote a famous memoir of bohemian Dublin in the 1950s— Remembering How we Stood.

== Darby Ryan ==
Diarmuid Ó Ríain (Darby Ryan) was born at Ashgrove, Bansha, in 1777 and was a poet and patriot. His compositions include The Peeler and the Goat, a ballad or satire which was popularly sung across Ireland and was taken worldwide by emigrants. Copies of his Tipperary Minstrelsy are to be found in the British Museum and at the Royal Irish Academy. Ryan died in 1855 and is buried in the old graveyard in Bansha.

== Sir William and Lady Butler ==
Lieutenant-General The Rt Hon. Sir William Francis Butler, GCB, PC (31 October 1838 – 7 June 1910), a soldier, a writer, and an adventurer, lived in retirement at Bansha Castle from 1905 until his death in 1910. Sir William was born a few miles distant at 'Suirville', Ballyslatteen. He took part in many colonial campaigns in Canada and India, but mainly in Africa, including the Ashanti wars and the Zulu War under General Sir Garnet Wolseley. He was made commander-in-chief of the British Army in South Africa in 1898, where he was also High Commissioner for a short period. His views on colonialism were often controversial as he was sympathetic to the natives in many of the outposts of the British Empire in which he served. His wife, the famous battle artist, Elizabeth Thompson (1846–1933), known as Lady Butler, continued to live at the castle until 1922 when she went to live at Gormanston Castle, County Meath, with their youngest daughter, Eileen, who became Viscountess Gormanston (1883–1964) in 1911 on her marriage to the 15th Viscount Gormanston (1878–1925), the Premier Viscount of Ireland. Lady Butler died in 1933 in her 87th year and is buried at Stamullen Graveyard in County Meath, just up the road from Gormanston. Among her many famous paintings is The Roll Call depicting a scene in the Crimean War. This painting was bought by Queen Victoria and forms part of the Royal Collection and is now in Buckingham Palace. Her daughter Eileen suffered a great loss during the Second World War when two of her three sons, William, 16th Lord Gormanston, and Stephen were killed in action at Dunkirk (1940) and Anzio (1944) respectively. Both boys, together with their brother Robert and sister Antoinette, spent many childhood days at Bansha Castle where they were once marooned during the Irish Civil War when Bansha and the surrounding area was the cockpit for fighting between the Free State forces and the local Republicans. Descendants of Sir William and Lady Elizabeth include their great-grandson, the 17th Viscount Gormanston, who lives in London.

== McCarthy family of Springhouse ==
The MacCarthy Reagh family of Carbery in West Cork were aristocrats of the old Gaelic order, Princes of the medieval Barony of Carbery. Since early in the 15th century, they had their principal seat at Kilbrittain Castle, near Kinsale. Denis McCarthy Reagh settled at Springhouse, near Bansha in the late 17th century where he built a mansion and had an estate of 9,000 acres (3,642 ha), which in its day was considered to be the largest cultivated farm in Europe. Owing to the severity of the Penal Laws, his grandson, also named Denis went into exile in France where he died at Argenton, Berry in 1761. Justin McCarthy (1744–1811), son of the exiled Denis, realised his father's property and settled at Toulouse. He was an accomplished linguist and classical scholar. He cultivated the fine arts and possessed one of the finest libraries in France, rivalling the King's collection at Paris. He and his family resided in splendour at their palatial townhouse at 3, Rue Mage in the city of Toulouse.

The best known of the Count's children was the Abbe Nicholas Tuite MacCarthy, also known as the Abbe de Levignac after one of the Count's properties. He was a famous Jesuit preacher, who is buried in the cathedral of St. Peter in Annecy. On Count Justin's death, his extensive estate was dispersed and as part of the family settlements, the townhouse was sold to his youngest son, Justin who resided there until his death at the age of 77 in 1862. The residence which was all that remained of the family property was sold in 1873 to a well-known family of bankers - Courtois de Vicoze - in Toulouse and is still a famous banking hall. Soon afterwards, the last of the family in Toulouse, Nicholas McCarthy Reagh son of Joseph Patrick MacCarthy (1779–1862) and grandson of the original Count Justin bade farewell to the city and so ended the family connection with the place which had lasted for about a century. The Count lived into the 20th century and died in 1906, and this ended the male line in France of the McCarthys of Springhouse after 132 years.

At home in Ireland, the McCarthy family were noted priest-protectors in penal times and Springhouse was considered a safe haven for priests on the run from persecution. A namesake, Donough McCarthy was consecrated Bishop of Cork & Cloyne on 16 Aug. 1713 in Villa Domus Fontis which was the Latinised equivalent of Springhouse. A family member, Edward McCarthy (1739–1823) was a member of the diocesan clergy of Cashel & Emly and served as parish priest of Ballinahinch and Killoscully.

Richard Lalor Sheil (1791–1851), Irish politician - Member of Parliament for County Tipperary, writer and orator, was the son of Edward Sheil of Bellevue, near Waterford and Catherine McCarthy of Springhouse. Another family member of a later generation was Catherine, daughter of Patrick McCarthy, farmer, of Ballygurteen, Kilmoyler, who survived the sinking of the RMS Titanic in 1912. The Springhouse family still survives in Ireland, a family branch of recent memory lived at 'Coolavunga' (Cúil an Mhongáin), the medieval name for the townland of Barnlough, near Bansha, during the 20th century and members of that family still reside in nearby Tipperary Town and elsewhere in Ireland. In France, though the male line died out in 1906 with the death of the last Count, the bloodline has continued by virtue of Christine Marie, daughter of Count Justin. Christine married Augustine de Rey, the Marquis de St. Gery and their descendants still reside in the Chateau de St. Gery, a few kilometres from Toulouse.

The family's great mansion at Springhouse was dismantled in the early 19th century with only a trace remaining near the lakeshore in the grounds of Kilshane House which was built by the Lowe family who replaced them in the 1820s and who also had an estate in Kenmare, County Kerry. The old mansion of Spring House was replaced by another of the same name to which the McCarthys moved and this house was subsequently known as 'Arraghslea' which is still extant. The stones for the building of 'Arraghslea' came from the ruins of an old castle located at nearby Dromline. The placename of Springhouse or Spring House originated from a spring or well near a whitethorn tree close to the scullery at the rear of the mansion house and the townland assumed this name thereafter. The McCarthys of Springhouse also have their 'Banshee' (Clíodhna), the story of which is told by Thomas Crofton Croker in his Fairy Tales and Traditions of the South of Ireland published in 1825. In the old graveyard at Bansha village, the family vault is discreetly located inside the graveyard wall opposite Mr O'Heney's public house at the junction of the glen road leading to the Glen of Aherlow. A member of the 'Coolavunga' branch of the family - James McCarthy Reagh, wrote a poem entitled "The Haunted Village", which is sometimes recited on social occasions by the older people of the village.

== Other notable people ==
- Frank Baker (1889–1961), cricketer and Royal Navy officer.
- John Moloney - Gaelic football & hurling referee
- Christy Roche - jockey
- Edmund Quirke, native from Ashgrove, Bansha, murdered at age 10

== Community and events ==
The Bansha Agricultural Show is held annually, augmented by a festival week in late August. For recreation, game shooting and fishing in the rivers Suir, Ara and Aherlow River are common. There are also a number of sporting clubs such as Bansha Golf Society, Bansha Celtic F.C. which promotes Association football (soccer) and the Galtee Rovers GAA - Hurling & Gaelic Football Club (affiliated to the GAA, 1885). Bansha has also long been associated with horse racing and breeding.

== See also ==
- List of towns and villages in Ireland
