= Aherlow River =

River in County Limerick and County Tipperary, Ireland

Coordinates: 52.339561°N 8.248872°W

- Native name: An Eatharlach (Irish)

Location
- Country: Ireland

Physical characteristics
- Source
  - location: Anglesborough, County Tipperary
- Mouth
  - location: River Suir at Kilmoyler
- Basin size: 99 km^{2} (38 sq mi)
- Discharge
  - average: 1.070 m^{3}/s (37.8 cu ft/s)

Basin features
- Tributaries
  - left: River Ara
  - right: Clydagh River

The Aherlow River (/ˌæhərˈloʊ/; Irish: An Eatharlach) is a river in County Limerick and County Tipperary, Ireland.

== Name ==
The name Aherlow comes from eatharlach, an old Irish word believed to mean "lowland between two high lands", i.e. a valley, in this case between the Galtee Mountains and Slievenamuck.

== Course ==
The Aherlow River rises in Anglesborough, County Limerick, flowing westward towards Ballygibbon and then turning north, meeting two tributaries in Lyre and flowing northwards near Galbally, County Limerick. It then turns eastwards, passes under the R663 and for 5 km forms the County Limerick–County Tipperary border. It enters the Glen of Aherlow then, and follows a meandering course through the Glen, meeting the Clydagh River at Pollagh and another tributary at Ashgrove, where it passes under the five-arch Ashgrove Bridge. The Aherlow River continues eastward, passing under the Limerick–Rosslare railway line in Tankerstown and is bridged by the N24. It meets the River Ara and another tributary at Ballymorris, and flows on southeastwards, flowing into the Suir at Kilmoyler.

== Wildlife ==
As with many tributaries of the River Suir, the Aherlow River is a noted brown trout fishery.

== See also ==
- Rivers of Ireland
