= Aherlow =

Aherlow may refer to several things in Ireland:

- Glen of Aherlow, a valley in County Tipperary
- Aherlow River, in counties Limerick and Tipperary
- Aherlow GAA, a Gaelic sports club in County Tipperary
