= River Ara =

River in County Tipperary, Ireland

Coordinates: 52.427047°N 8.238797°W

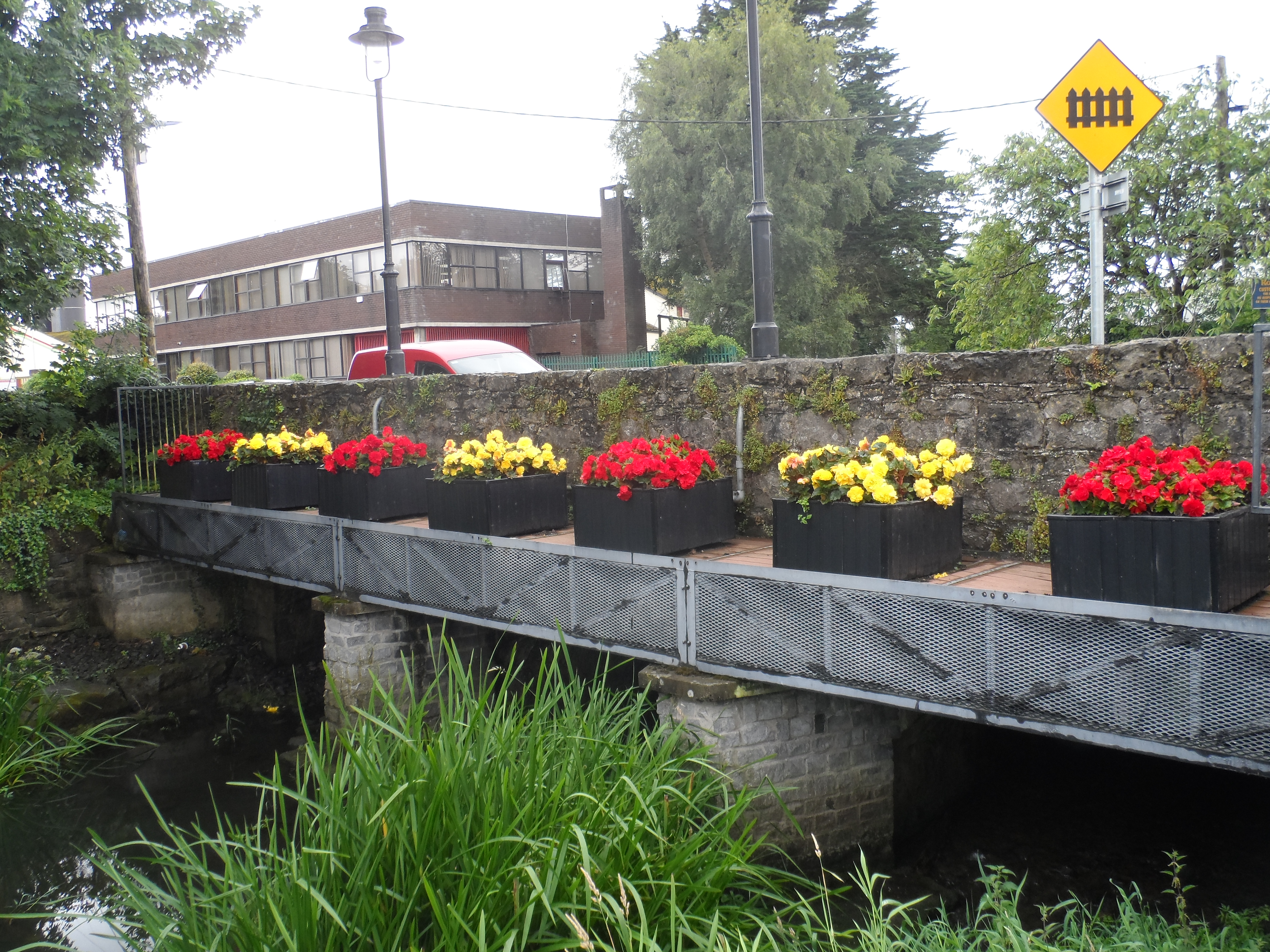
- Bridge over the Ara on Station Road, Tipperary (R664)
- Native name: An Ára (Irish)

Location
- Country: Ireland

Physical characteristics
- Source
  - location: Shrough, County Tipperary
  - elevation: 136 m (446 ft)
- Mouth
  - location: Celtic Sea at Waterford Harbour via Aherlow River and Suir
- Length: 29.4 km (18.3 mi)
- Discharge
  - average: 0.03 m^{3}/s (1.1 cu ft/s)

The River Ara (/ˈærə/; Irish: An Ára) is a river in County Tipperary, Ireland.

== Name ==
The Ara (sometimes spelled Arra) takes its name from the ancient territory of Ara (Aradh, Tir Arad, Dál Cairbri Arad) in which it is found, ruled by the Ó Donnagáin (O'Donegans). It gives its name to the barony of Owney and Arra and the Arra Mountains, while Tipperary town (and thus County Tipperary) takes its name from Tiobrad Árann (many spelling variants exist), "the spring by the Ara."

== Course ==
The Ara rises in Shrough in the Glen of Aherlow. It flows north, passing under the R662 near Mount Bruis village and meeting a tributary in Shronell. It flows on eastwards, passing through Tipperary where it passes under the Limerick–Rosslare railway line, is bridged by the R664 and separates The Abbey School from the rest of the town. The Ara flows southward past Tipperary Golf Club and then eastward through Bansha Wood. It is bridged by the N24 near Kilshane House and recrosses the Limerick–Rosslare railway line. It continues southeastwards through Bansha and is crosses by Bansha Bridge, a triple-arched limestone bridge (1863). In Ballymorris it drains into the Aherlow River.

== Wildlife ==
As with many tributaries of the River Suir, the Ara is a noted brown trout fishery. A restaurant on Abbey Street, Tipperary, just yards from the river, bears the name "The Brown Trout".

== See also ==
- Rivers of Ireland
