= R662 road (Ireland) =

Road in Ireland

Coordinates: 52.386443°N 8.303508°W

R662 road
- Bóthar R662
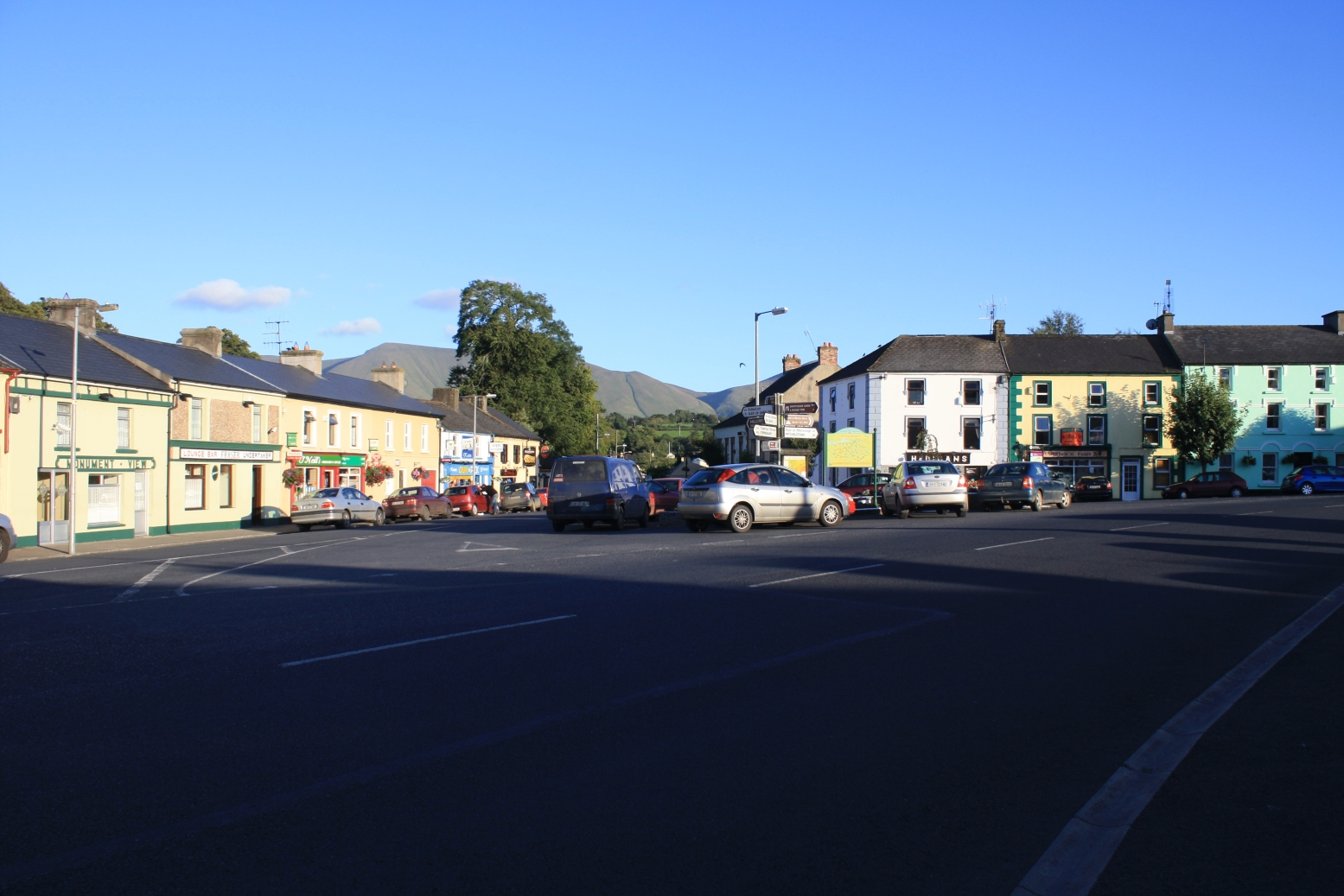
- R662 passing through Galbally

Route information
- Length: 20.5 km (12.7 mi)

Major junctions
- From: R515 Tipperary (O'Brien Street)
- Crosses River Ara and Limerick–Rosslare railway line Enters County Limerick; R663 Galbally
- To: R513 Ballyfauskeen Cross

Location
- Country: Ireland

Highway system
- Roads in Ireland; Motorways; Primary; Secondary; Regional

The R662 road is a regional road in Ireland, located in County Limerick and County Tipperary.
