= Moor Abbey =

Franciscan friary in County Tipperary

- An Múr
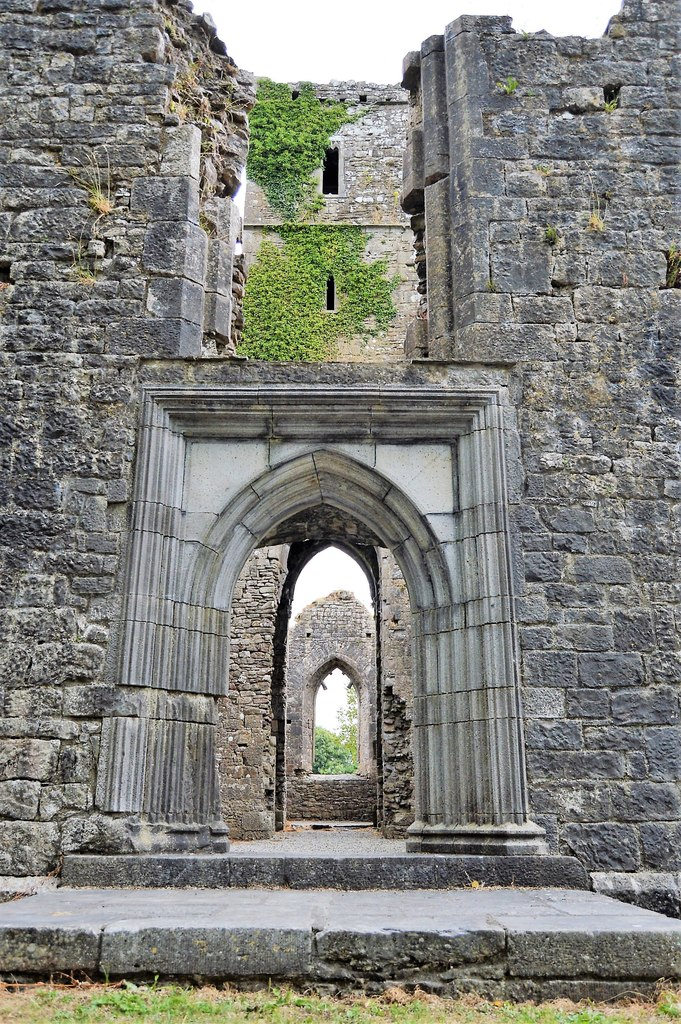
- Entrance

- Location within Ireland
- Interactive map of Moor Abbey

Monastery information
- Other name: Galbally Friary
- Order: Order of Friars Minor (Franciscans)
- Established: between 1210 and 1242
- Disestablished: 1748
- Diocese: Cashel and Emly

People
- Founder: Donnchadh Cairprech Ó Briain

Architecture
- Functional status: Abandoned
- Heritage designation: National Monument
- Style: Irish Gothic

Site
- Location: Moorabbey, Galbally, County Tipperary, Ireland
- Coordinates: 52°24′09″N 8°16′41″W
- Public access: yes

Moor Abbey (Irish: An Múr) is a ruined medieval Franciscan friary in Galbally, County Tipperary, Ireland, on the banks of the River Aherlow. Originally founded in the 13th century, the surviving ruins date from the late 15th century. The abbey was burnt down by British forces in 1569.

== History ==
Located on the north bank of the River Aherlow, Moor Abbey was established by Donnchadh Cairprech Ó Briain, King of Thomond 1210–42. In 1471 a new church was constructed at the site, but burned down in 1472. The buildings that survive today date from that period.

In 1541 the friary was dissolved and later became the property of John, brother of James FitzGerald, 14th Earl of Desmond. In 1569, during the Desmond Rebellions, the abbey was burned by government soldiers led by Sir Humphrey Gilbert, originally from Devon and a half-brother of Sir Walter Raleigh. The following year Fr. Dermot O'Mulrooney and two other friars returned to the friary but were murdered by government forces. The Franciscans came back again in 1645, only to be expelled by Cromwellian forces. It was 1658 before they could once again occupy the Abbey. They finally left for the last time in 1748 after a dispute with Fr. James Butler, Vicar-General of Cashel & Emly diocese and the abbey fell into ruin. The friars went to Mitchelstown, and the last friar of Moor Abbey died there in 1804. An attempt by the Royal Irish Constabulary to detonate the Abbey in 1921 failed.

== Building ==
The ruined church consists of a nave and chancel, separated by a tall bell-tower with sedilia. In the chancel is a double piscina. Beside the doorway in the north wall of the chancel is a font. No other buildings remain.

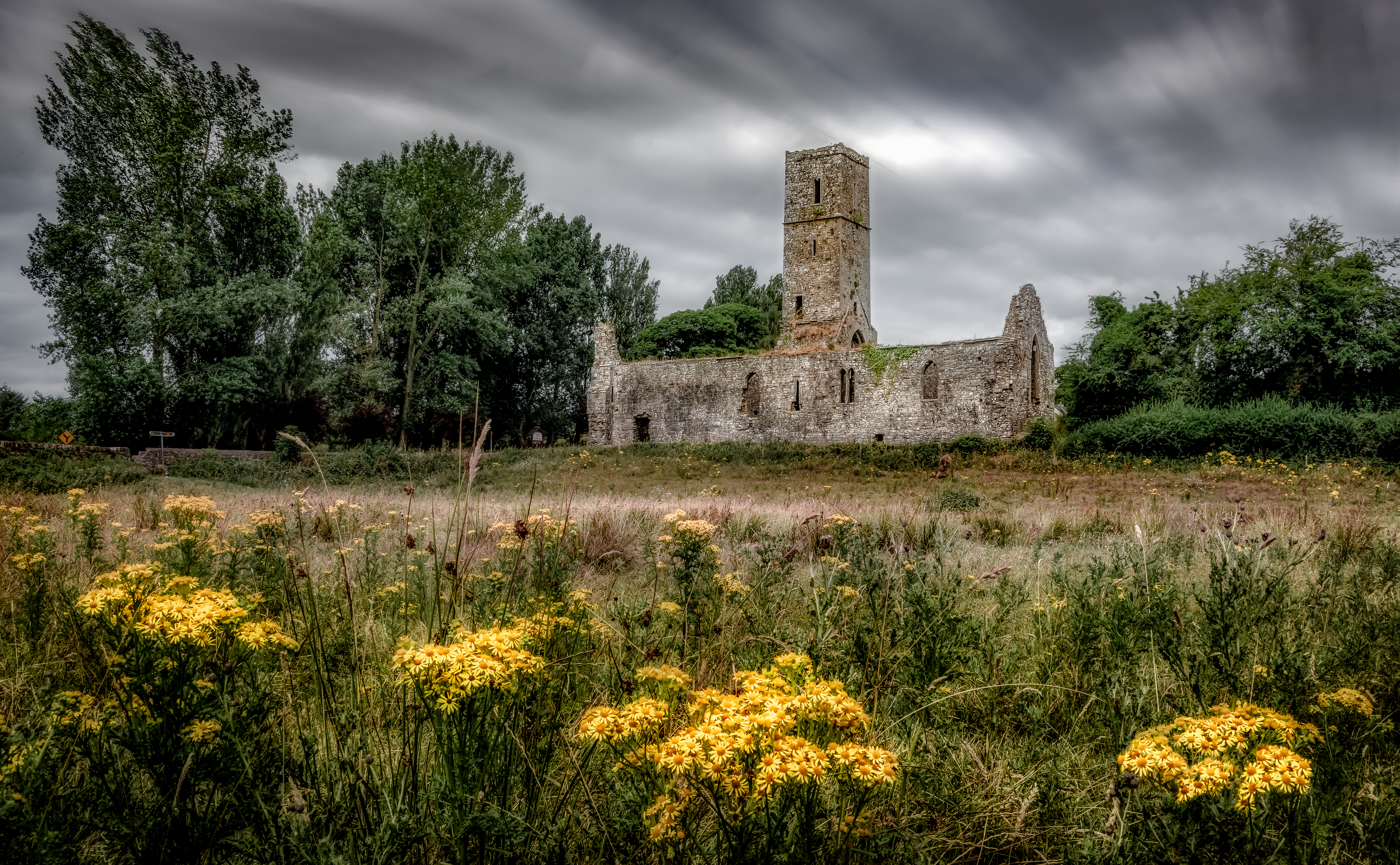
The abbey buildings

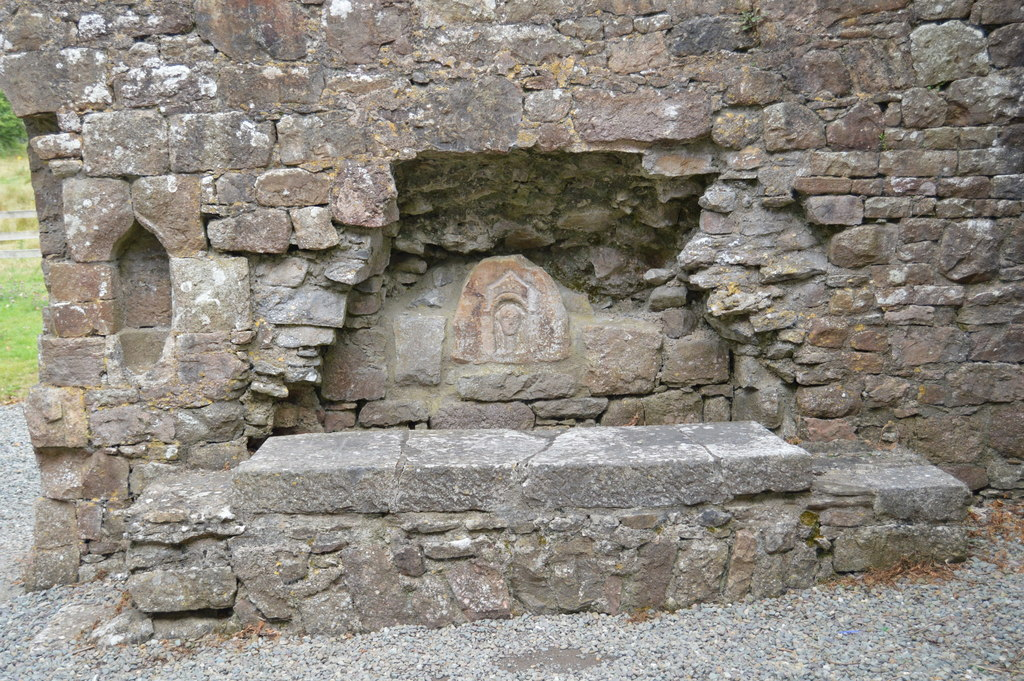
Sedilia

Bell tower
