= Lattin, County Tipperary =

Village in County Tipperary, Ireland

Lattin Laitean
- Village
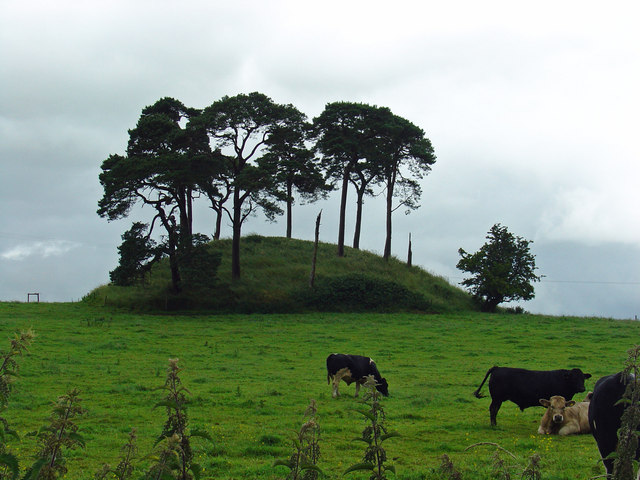
- Ancient burial mound just outside Lattin in County Tipperary

- Location within Ireland
- Coordinates: 52.467°N 8.275°W
- Country: Ireland
- County: County Tipperary
- Barony: Clanwilliam
- Irish grid reference: R812350

Lattin (Irish: Laitean) is a village and civil parish in south County Tipperary in Ireland. It is within the historical barony of Clanwilliam, and is also one half of the 'Lattin and Cullen' parish in the Roman Catholic Archdiocese of Cashel and Emly. Lattin village is located on the R515 regional road between the towns of Emly and Tipperary.

== History ==
Evidence of ancient settlement in the area includes an ancient burial mound (a barrow-mound) just east of the village, which can be clearly seen from the Emly/Tipperary road.

== Amenities and features ==
The village comprises a church, cemetery and two pubs. The cemetery is located approximately 100 metres west of the Roman Catholic church. This church, the Church of the Assumption, was built in 1863 and is listed on the Record of Protected Structures for South Tipperary.

Lattin is surrounded by pasture land, much of which is used for dairy farming. It is situated in an area of south Tipperary known as the Golden Vale, an area in which the land is particularly suitable for grass growing and dairy farming.

Lattin's local GAA club, Lattin–Cullen GAA, is affiliated to the West Division Board of Tipperary GAA. The club is historically associated with Gaelic football.

The primary schools of Shronell and Mount Bruis tend to concentrate their religious and sporting activities in Lattin village.

== See also ==
- List of towns and villages in Ireland
