= Galbally, County Limerick =

Village in County Limerick, Ireland

Galbally An Gallbhaile (Irish)
- Village
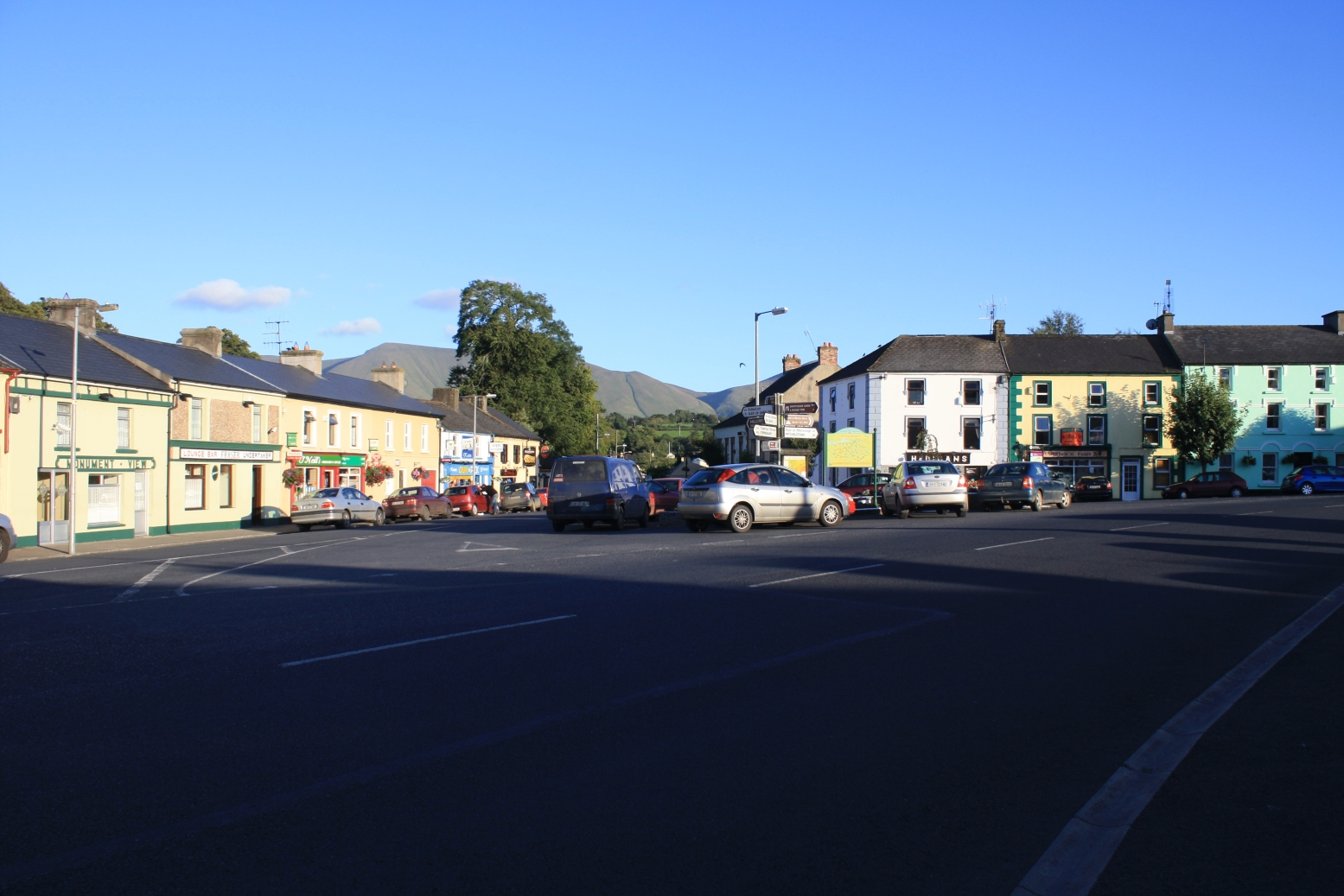
- View looking south from the village square

- Location in Ireland
- Coordinates: 52.401°N 8.296°W
- Country: Ireland
- Province: Munster
- County: County Limerick
- Elevation: 112 m (367 ft)

Population (2022)
  - Total: 269
- Irish Grid Reference: R798278

Galbally (Irish: An Gallbhaile, meaning 'town of the stranger or the foreigner') is a village in southeast County Limerick, Ireland, on the border with County Tipperary. It is located at the foot of the Galtee Mountains and at the western approach to the Glen of Aherlow. The Aherlow River, flowing down from the Galtee mountains, runs by the village, to meet the Suir at Kilmoyler a short distance north of Cahir. Galbally is in a valley overlooked by the Galtee Mountains. The village is in a townland and civil parish of the same name.

== History ==
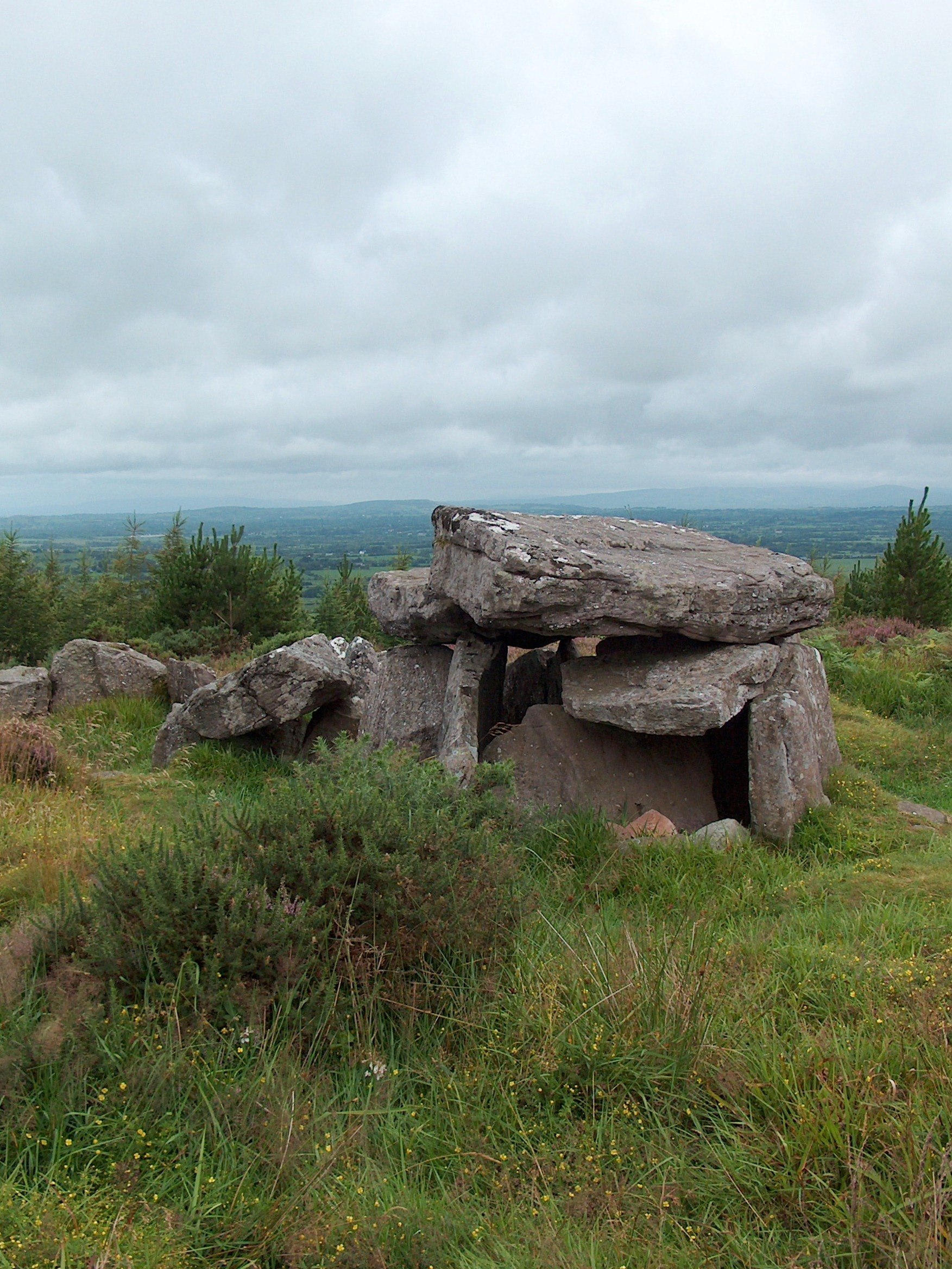
Megalithic passage tomb at Duntryleague near Galbally

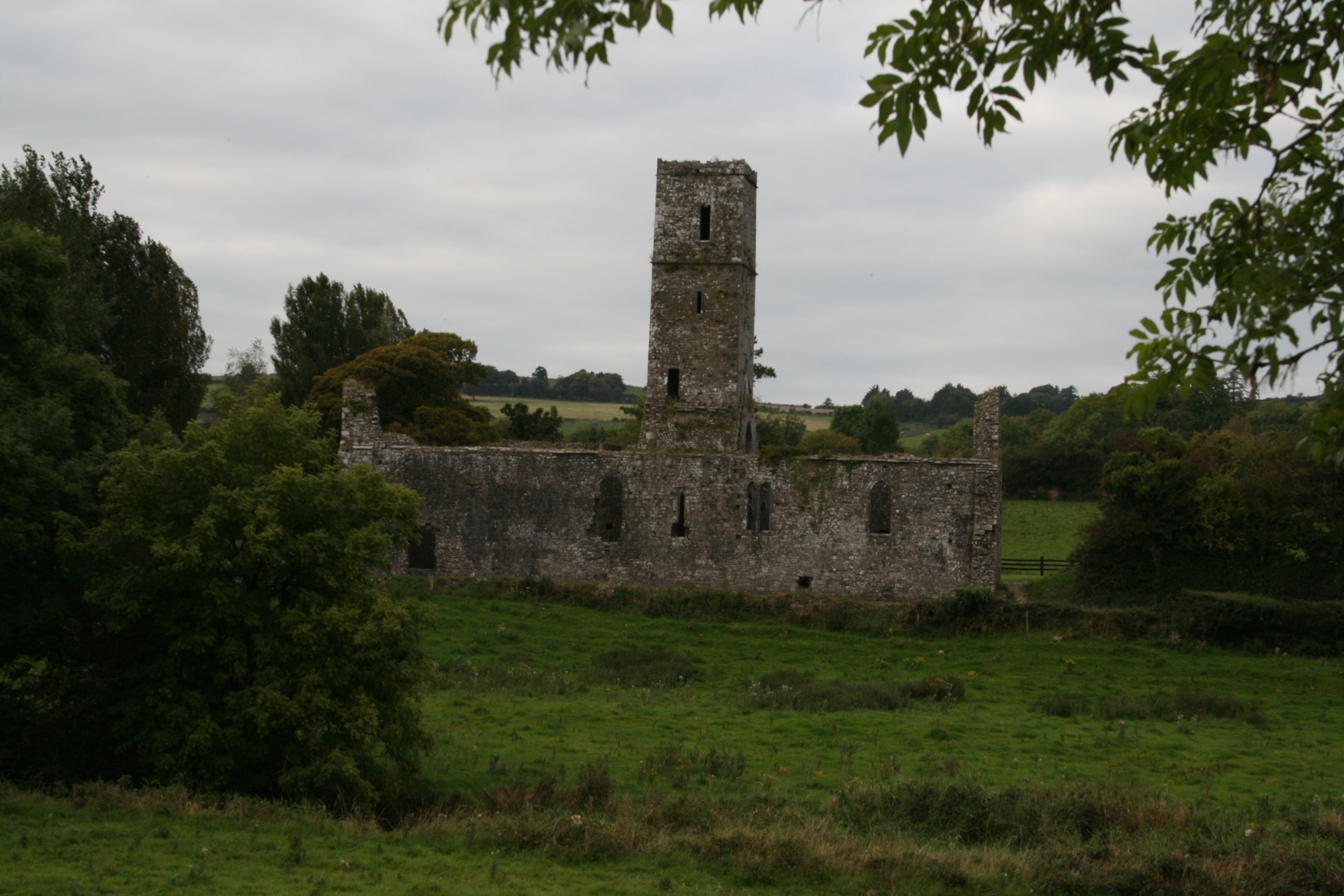
Moor Abbey ruins, Galbally

A number of archaeological sites and buildings in the Galbally area are included in the Record of Protected Structures. Among these is "Darby's Bed", a passage tomb which sits on a nearby hill in the townland of Duntryleague. It is cited in Irish legend as one of the places where Diarmuid and Grainne spent a night during their flight from the angry Fionn MacCumhaill.

Also located just outside the village is Moor Abbey. This Franciscan friary was founded in the thirteenth century by Donach Cairbreach Ua'Briain. The only standing building from the site is the friary's church, which was built in 1471. The site had a tumultuous history, matching the ebbs and flows of Irish politics and religious freedoms, and was inhabited until 1748, though with periods of desertion. Present in the church is the remains of a tomb, which is perhaps that of the founder.

In the centre of Galbally's village square is a statue of a soldier, erected in memory of named local volunteers who lost their lives during the War of Independence in 1921. The south side of the square was the site of a poor house during famine times. Charles Bianconi's carriages used to drive through the village, and the stables they used still stand on the north side of the village square.

The Barons Massy of Duntryleague had their original seat in the area and their Charnel house (burial place) is still extant. The Massy's, an English family of Norman descent, received land in county Limerick in the Cromwellian plantation, and settled in Duntryleague, in the parish of Galbally. The family played a prominent role in the Anglo-Irish ascendancy class up to the 20th century. Their Summer house, Massy Lodge, stands near the neighbouring village of Anglesborough.

Also located at Duntryleague are the remains of a Protestant church tower and a graveyard. A number of the graves are occupied by the Bennett family, who had owned nearby Gleneffy House Estate (also known as Castle Creagh) from the Act of Settlement in 1662 until the 1920s. William H Massy Bennett, a Justice of the Peace, lived there until his death in 1920. After his death, it was sold by his son George Latham Massy Bennett in an auction held in Tipperary town hall in August 1920. In 1826 the Rev P Fitzgerald referred to Castle Creagh as "a very handsome seat of the Bennet family, now in ruins" in his History of Limerick. The current Gleneffy House was built for William's father, George Latham Bennett by the architect Charles Frederick Anderson in the 1850s, it stands on the site of the older castle, mentioned by the Rev Fitzgerald, and is located on the hillside of the Glen of Aherlow to the north of Galbally. It is now a private residence.

== Amenities ==
Galbally hosts amenities and services include a number of pubs, a carpenters, undertakers, shops, a chipper, a number of B&Bs, a village museum/gallery, and an equestrian centre. The village's sporting facilities include: pitches for field sports, a community field, and "all weather" astro-turf facilities.

The village's Catholic church, the Church of Christ the King, is within the ecclesiastical parish of Galbally & Lisvernane which straddles the Limerick-Tipperary border. Its 'sister' village within this parish is the village of Lisvernane, which lies in the Glen of Aherlow in County Tipperary.

== Community and clubs ==
Although the Gaelic Athletic Association usually has one club in each parish, there are two in this parish: Galbally, on the Limerick side, who are based at Cussen Memorial Park and Aherlow, across the border in Tipperary who are based at O'Gorman Park. While each club plays hurling to some extent, gaelic football is the primary sport, and both clubs have won their respective county senior football championships, Aherlow winning the Tipperary title for the first time in 2006. Galbally were first-time winners of the Limerick Senior Football Championship in 1994 and repeated the feat in 1997. Galbally also won the 1995 County Junior B Hurling title, captained by John Kiely, who went on to manage the Limerick county hurling team to victory in the 2018 All-Ireland Senior Hurling Championship Final.

Galbally Camogie Club fields teams from under 12 to Senior. Galbally is also home to the Mooreabbey Milers AC running club.

In 1994, Galbally was selected as the 'prettiest town in Ireland' in the annual Irish Tidy Towns Competition, and has won the Limerick competition nine times.

== Popular culture ==
A folk ballad, The Galbally Farmer, tells of the trials suffered by a hired labourer working for the miserly farmer of the title, Darby O'Leary.

In January 2024, American comedian Conan O'Brien visited Galbally as part of his travel show Conan O'Brien Must Go. O'Brien learned from a genealogist that his great-grandfather Thomas O'Brien, son of Jeremiah, was from Galbally.

== See also ==
- List of towns and villages in Ireland
- Galbally, County Tyrone
