= Temple Hill (Ireland) =

Mountain in Ireland

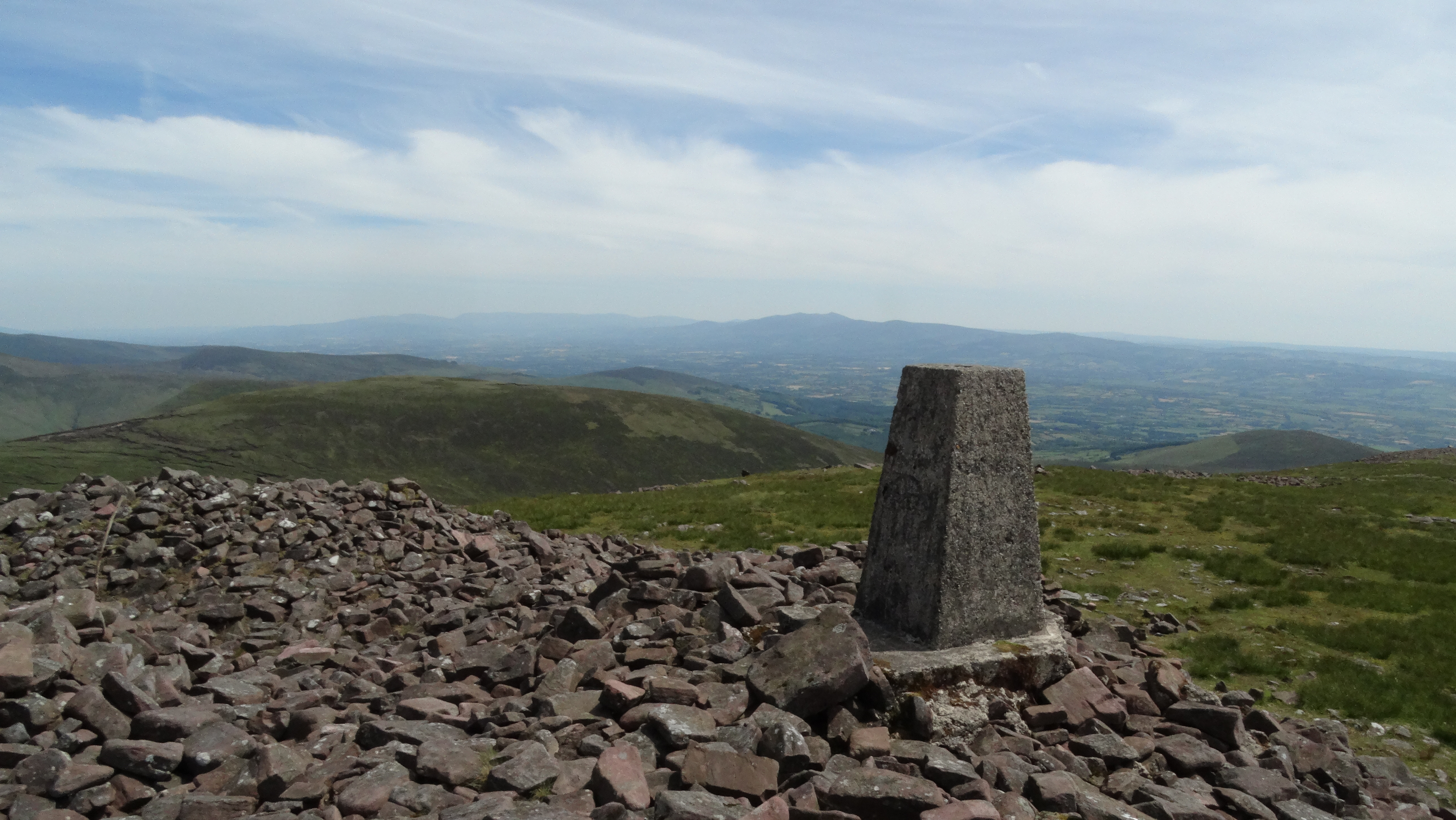
- Trig point on Temple Hill, looking towards the Knockmealdown Mountains

Highest point
- Elevation: 783 m (2,569 ft)
- Prominence: 188
- Listing: Marilyn
- Coordinates: 52.348°N 8.244°W

Geography
- Location within island of Ireland
- Location: County Limerick, Ireland
- OSI/OSNI grid: R834218

Temple Hill is a mountain in the Galty Mountains, in County Limerick, Ireland. In the Bronze Age it was a place of worship.
