= Frank Baker (cricketer) =

Anglo-Irish Royal Navy officer and cricketer

Personal information
- Full name: Frank Adam Conyers Baker
- Born: 6 December 1889; Bansha, Ireland
- Died: 17 March 1961 (aged 71); Witley, Surrey, England
- Batting: Unknown

Career statistics
Competition	First-class
Matches	1
Runs scored	34
Batting average	17.00
100s/50s	–/–
Top score	28
Catches/stumpings	–/–
- Source: Cricinfo, 17 September 2019

Frank Adam Conyers Baker OBE (6 December 1889 – 17 March 1961), given name also as Francis, was an Anglo-Irish Royal Navy officer and first-class cricketer.

== Life ==
He was born at Bansha in County Tipperary in December 1889. He was baptised the following year in Argentina, on 24 October 1890, by the Rev. Robert Allen, as Francis Adam Conyers Baker, recorded as the son of Arthur Conyers Baker and Mary Abercrombie Baker, his father being owner of an estancia, domiciled at Estancia San Juan, Tala, Entre Ríos Province. His brother Arthur William Hay Conyers-Baker (born 1891) and father Arthur Conyers Baker (1845–1928), the rancher in Argentina, were both educated at Marlborough College.

Baker entered the Britannia Royal Naval College in 1905. After graduating from Britannia, he served aboard HMS Argyll. He was commended by Italy with a medal with diploma for his services in the aftermath of the 1908 Messina earthquake. He was promoted to the rank of lieutenant in October 1913. Baker served in the First World War with the Royal Navy, serving aboard several ships and being mentioned in dispatches in December 1918.

In October 1920, Baker was promoted to the rank of lieutenant commander. In February 1921, he was decorated by the president of Portugal, António José de Almeida, with the Military Order of Aviz. He was promoted to the rank of commander in June 1926. Baker fell ill in 1935, requiring hospitalisation at Royal Hospital Haslar, with it being several months before he was declared fit.

Baker retired from active service, at his own request, in June 1936. In 1937 he was Coastguard Inspector for the East Anglian region. He was made an OBE in the 1949 New Year Honours, and died in March 1961 at Witley, Surrey.

== Cricket ==
Following the war, Baker made a single appearance in first-class cricket when he was selected to play for the Royal Navy against Cambridge University at Fenner's in 1920. Batting twice in the match, he was dismissed for 6 runs by Charles Marriott in the Royal Navy first-innings, while in their second-innings he was dismissed for 28 runs by Gilbert Ashton.

== Family ==
Baker's parents were married in 1881 in New Orleans; Arthur Conyers Baker was given as the seventh son of Colonel George Baker, 16th Lancers, and marrying Mary Abercromby Clayton, daughter of Dr John Clayton of Banff. There were at least four daughters and two sons of the marriage:

- Mary Honor Caroline Baker married in 1905, at age 23, Gillespie Carew O'Dwyer, from the family residence in Argentina.
- Dorothy Conyers Baker, the second daughter, married in 1912 Reginald Boys of the Royal Engineers, from 22 Cottesmore Gardens, Kensington, London, as his second wife: they had two sons, and a daughter. The daughter, Cicely Margaret Heather Boys, married Donald Albery as his second wife, and was mother of Nicholas Bronson Albery and Tim Albery.
- Cecily (or Cicely) Joan Baker, the third daughter, married in 1913 Cecil Abercrombie, from 22 Cottesmore Gardens.
- Frank Baker married in 1915 Gladys Henderson, daughter of Thomas Henderson of Banff, at Turriff. He is given at that time as the elder son, serving on HMS Legion (1914).
- Angela Mary Baker, married in 1920 Jocelyn Arthur Adair Pickard (1885–1962), a former Royal Engineer who became Director-General of RoSPA.

Arthur William Hay Conyers-Baker, born 28 July 1891, was Frank's younger brother, and was commissioned in the North Staffordshire Regiment in 1911. He retired from the Army in 1933. In 1937 he was a Chief Constable of the Metropolitan Police. During World War II he worked in the War Office. He committed suicide in 1948.
