= Kilmoyler =

Townland in County Tipperary, Ireland

Coordinates: 52°25′17.7″N 7°58′47.8″W

Kilmoyler is a townland in the civil parish of Killardry in the barony of Clanwilliam, County Tipperary in Ireland. The townland is in the parish of 'Bansha and Kilmoyler' in the Roman Catholic Archdiocese of Cashel and Emly.

Kilmoyler is located approximately halfway between the town of Cahir and village of Bansha on the River Suir. Galtee Rovers GAA club (which takes its name from the nearby Galtee Mountains) has its club grounds and clubhouse in Bansha village.

While there is no hamlet or village centre in the townland, the Roman Catholic Our Lady Of The Assumption church at Kilmoyler is a focal point for the community. The parochial burial ground of Killaldriffe is nearby and is the burial place of soldier and adventurer William Francis Butler. Saint Pecaun (or Becán), a 7th century saint, is celebrated on 1 August each year when a pattern is held at the monastic settlement at nearby Toureen. The site consists of a ruined church, carved stones, a well and monastic cell. Also close by, across the River Suir, and close to its eastern bank, is Knockgraffon Motte, a motte-and-bailey of Anglo-Norman origin.

The area is the home place of contemporary artist and member of Aosdána, Alice Maher.
