= Newtown, Clanwilliam =

There are two townlands with the name Newtown, (Irish: An Baile Nua) in the Barony of Clanwilliam in County Tipperary, Ireland.

- Newtown in the civil parish of Clonbeg
- Newtown in the civil parish of Solloghodbeg

There are nineteen townlands known as Newtown in the whole of County Tipperary.
