= Anglesboro =

Village in County Limerick, Ireland

Anglesboro Gleann na gCreabhar
- Village
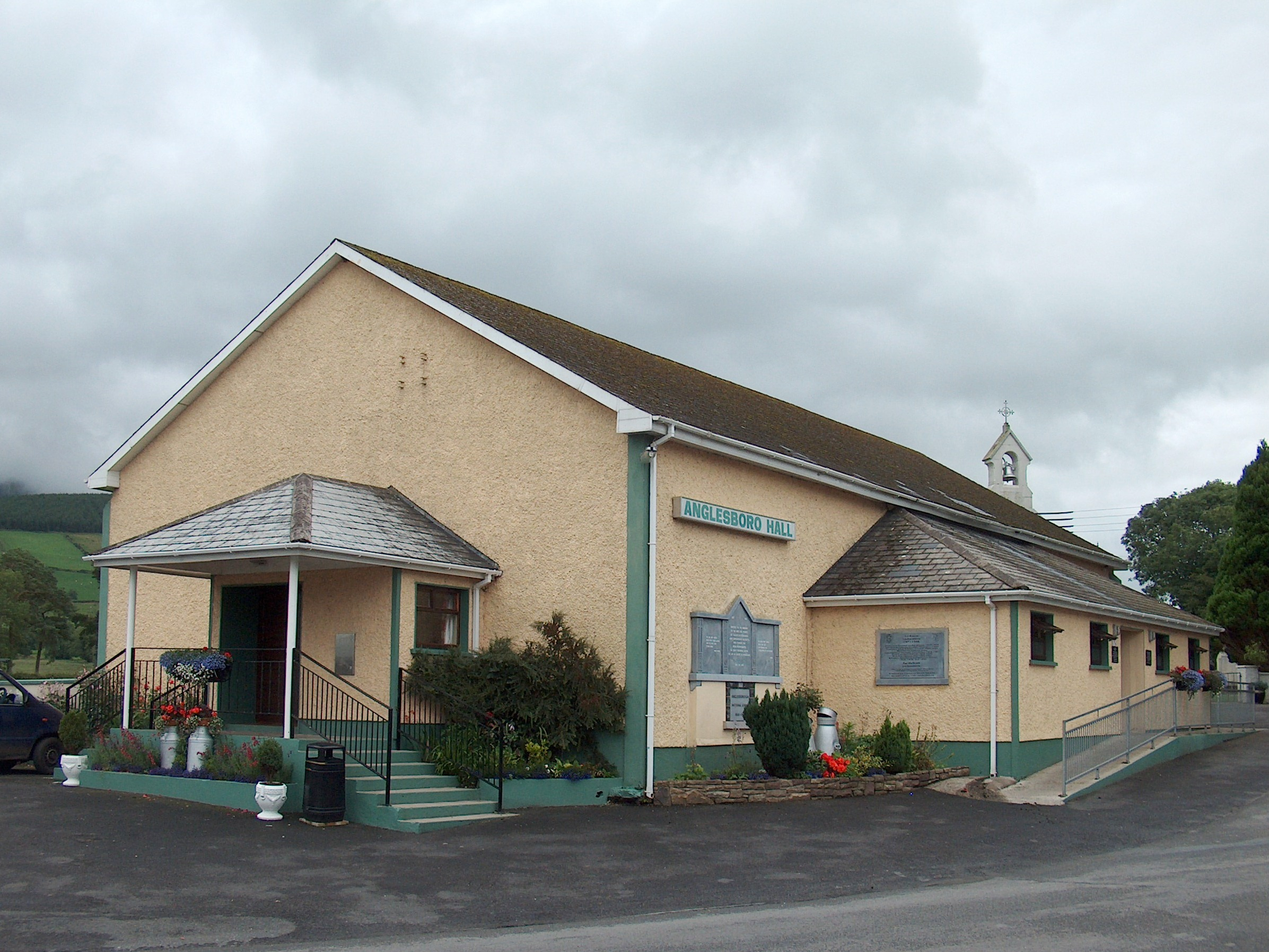
- Anglesboro Village Hall

- Location in Ireland
- Coordinates: 52.34237°N 8.28826°W
- Country: Ireland
- Province: Munster
- County: County Limerick
- Elevation: 198 m (650 ft)
- Irish Grid Reference: R803212

Anglesboro or Anglesborough (Irish: Gleann na gCreabhar, historically anglicized as Gleanagruer) is a small village at the foot of the Galtee Mountains, in southeastern County Limerick, Ireland. The nearest town is Mitchelstown in County Cork, approximately 12 kilometres away.

Liam Lynch (1893-1923) was an Irish republican military leader. He served as Chief of Staff of the Irish Republican Army between March 1922-April 1923. He was born at Barnagurraha and attended Anglesboro National School. A leading military commander in the War of Independence, he opposed the Anglo-Irish Treaty on the grounds that it disestablished the Irish Republic proclaimed in 1916. He assumed the position of Chief of Staff of the anti-Treaty IRA, known as the 'Irregulars.' He was killed in a skirmish with Free State forces in the Knockmealdown Mountains, County Tipperary, on 10 April 1923, aged 29.
