= Glen of Aherlow =

Valley in County Tipperary, Ireland

- Location within Ireland
- Length: 13 km (8.1 mi) east-west
- Width: 3 km (1.9 mi) north-south
- Area: about 40 square kilometres (9,900 acres)

Naming
- Native name: Gleann Eatharlaí (Irish)
- English translation: From Irish eatharlach, "land between elevations"

Geography
- Country: Ireland
- State: County Tipperary
- Region: Munster
- Borders on: Slievenamuck (north); Galtee Mountains (south)
- Coordinates: 52.419°N 8.193°W
- River: River Aherlow
- Interactive map of Glen of Aherlow

The Glen of Aherlow (Irish: Gleann Eatharlaí) is a valley located between Slievenamuck and the Galtee Mountains in the western part of County Tipperary in Ireland. The principal village is Lisvarrinane (alternately spelled Lisvernane or Lisfornane). There is also a hamlet at Rossadrehid, where Aherlow creamery was located before its closure in the late 20th century. Other adjacent centres of population are the villages of Galbally (on the western fringe), Kilross (on the north west front) and Bansha (on the eastern approach). Across the northern flank of Slievenamuck lies Tipperary Town.

The tradition of Geoffrey Keating still lives on in the folklore of the Glen of Aherlow. Keating preached sermons there, receiving refuge and, according to tradition, lived in a cave for much of the time while on the run and compiling his magnum opus, Foras Feasa Ar Éirinn (c. 1634).

== Statue ==
A statue, titled 'Christ the King', overlooks the valley in which the Glen of Aherlow is situated. The statue, constructed in 1950, is situated on Slievenamuck on the approach road to Tipperary Town.

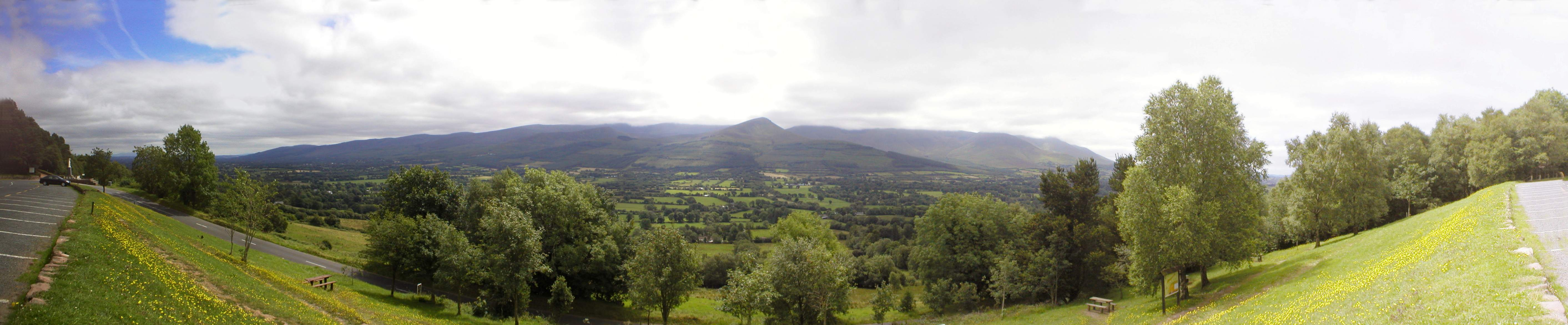
Panoramic view above the Glen of Aherlow from the 'Christ the King' statue area
