= Tipperary railway station =

Railway station in Tipperary, Ireland

Coordinates: 52.4703°N 8.1614°W

Tipperary Tiobraid Árann
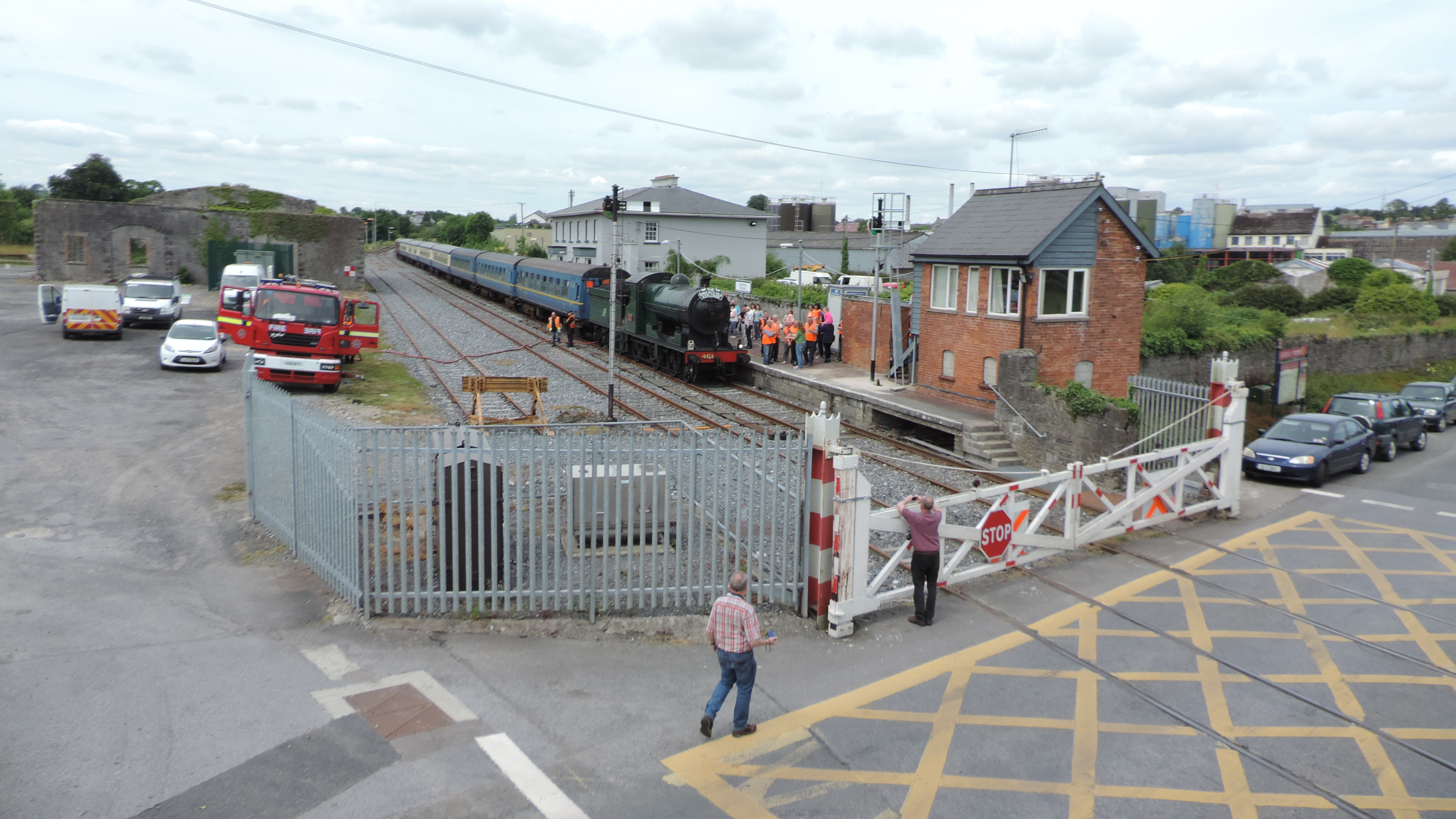
- A steam train at Tipperary

General information
- Location: Tipperary Enterprise Centre, Railway Road; Tipperary, E34 EK46; Ireland
- Owner: Iarnród Éireann
- Operator: Iarnród Éireann
- Platforms: 1

Construction
- Structure type: At-grade

Other information
- Station code: TIPRY
- Fare zone: C

History
- Opened: 9 May 1848
Location

Tipperary Station is a railway station that serves the town of Tipperary, County Tipperary in Ireland. It is approximately 500 metres from centre of town.

It has a weekday passenger service of two trains to Limerick Junction and two to Waterford. There is no Sunday service. Until 19 January 2013 (inclusive) there were three trains each way. However the late-morning Waterford to Limerick Junction and early-afternoon Limerick Junction to Waterford trains are now discontinued.

Change at Limerick Junction for connections to Limerick, Cork, Tralee, Galway & Dublin.

The station is staffed, but the ticket office and platform are not wheelchair-accessible.

In the 2017 NTA Heavy Rail Census, it showed the lowest usage figures of any station in the country, with a total of ten passengers, down from 24 in the 2016 census. This figure is for a given day, not an annual figure, and does not represent any weekend-specific commuting traffic or other seasonal variations.

== History ==
The station opened on 9 May 1848.

== See also ==
- List of railway stations in Ireland
