= Clanwilliam (County Tipperary) =

Barony in County Tipperary, Ireland

Clanwilliam (Irish: Clan Liam) is a barony in County Tipperary, Ireland. This geographical unit of land is one of 12 baronies in County Tipperary. Its chief town is Tipperary. The barony lies between Kilnamanagh Lower to the north (whose chief town is Dundrum), Iffa and Offa West to the south (whose chief town is Cahir) and Middle Third to the east (whose chief town is Cashel). It is currently administered by Tipperary County Council.

== Legal context ==
Baronies were created after the Norman invasion of Ireland as divisions of counties and were used the administration of justice and the raising of revenue. While baronies continue to be officially defined units, they have been administratively obsolete since 1898. However, they continue to be used in land registration and in specification, such as in planning permissions. In many cases, a barony corresponds to an earlier Gaelic túath which had submitted to the Crown.

== Modern times ==
When County Tipperary was split into North and South Ridings in 1836, Clanwilliam was allocated to the south riding. However, the neighbouring barony of Kilnamanagh was split into Upper and Lower half-baronies, being allocated to the north and south ridings respectively.

== Towns, villages and townlands of the barony ==
Bansha, Golden, Limerick Junction, Shronell, Newtown

=== Civil parishes of the barony ===
This table lists an historical geographical sub-division of the barony known as the civil parish (not to be confused with an Ecclesiastical parish).

Name in Irish	Name in English
Baile Ghrífín	Ballygriffin
Brí Ois	Bruis
Cill Airdrí	Killardry
Cill Churnáin	Kilcornan
Cill Fhiacal	Kilfeakle
Cill Mhíolchon	Kilmucklin
Cill tSeáin	Kilshane
Cluain Abhla	Clonoulty
Cluain Big	Clonbeg
Cluain Bolg	Clonbullogue
Cluain Peata	Clonpet
An Corrdhaingean	Cordangan
Corróg	Corroge
Cuilleann	Cullen
Daingean Deargáin	Dangandargan
Dún Eochaille	Donohill
Reilig Mhuire agus Áth Iseal	Relickmurry and Athassel
An Gleann Bán	Glenbane
Imleach	Emly
Laitean	Lattin
Ráth Laighnín	Rathlynin
Srónaill	Shronell
Sulchóid Bheag	Solloghodbeg or Soloheadbeg
Sulchóid Mhór	Solloghodmore
Teampall Néire	Templeneiry
An Teampall Nua	Templenoe
Teampall Uí Bhrídeáin	Templebredon
Tiobraid Árann	Tipperary
Tuaim	Toem
Uachtar Liag	Oughterleague

== See also ==
Earl of Clanwilliam
Clanwilliam (County Limerick)
