= N24 road (Ireland) =

National primary road between Limerick and Waterford

N24 road
- Bóthar N24
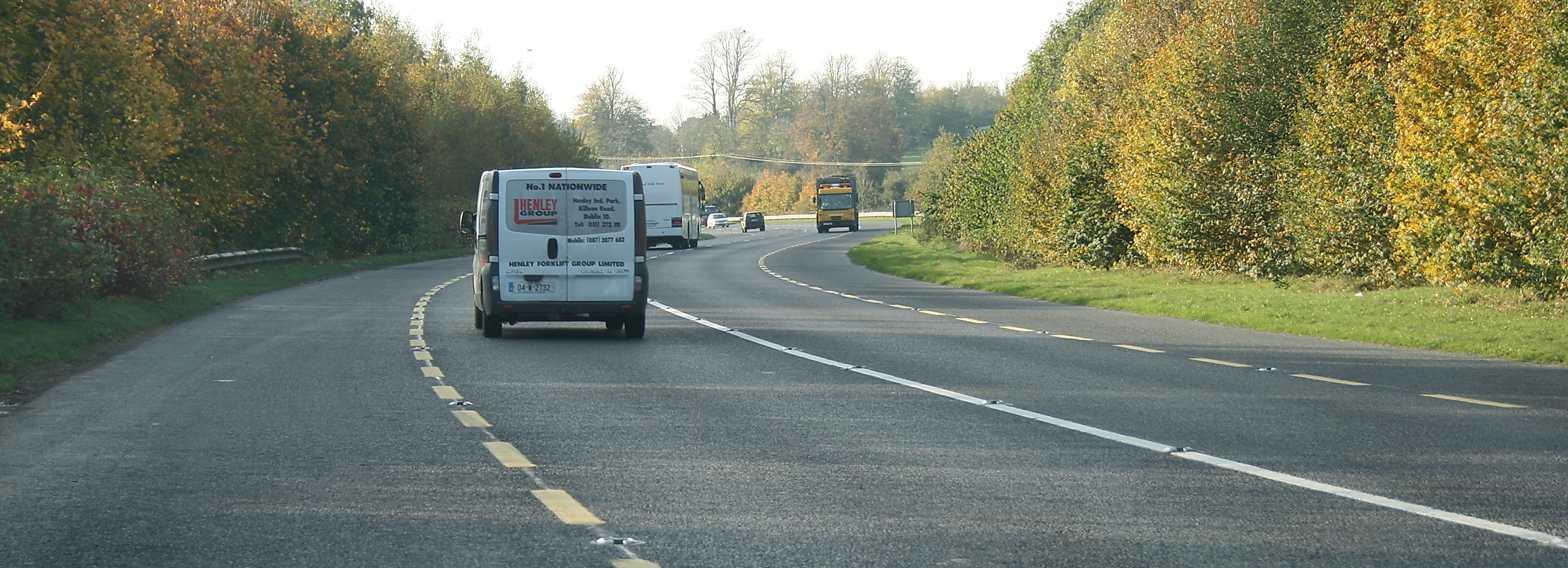
- Heading west on the N24 Clonmel Relief Road

Route information
- Length: 116.13 km (72.16 mi)

Location
- Country: Ireland
- Primary destinations: (bypassed routes in italics): County Limerick; Boher; Dromkeen; Pallasgreen; Oola; County Tipperary; Monard; Limerick Junction; Tipperary Town; Bansha; Cahir; Clonmel; Kilsheelan; Carrick-on-Suir; County Kilkenny; Mooncoin; Grannagh

Highway system
- Roads in Ireland; Motorways; Primary; Secondary; Regional

The N24 road is a national primary road in Ireland forming a route from Limerick to Waterford, running through County Tipperary and passing Tipperary town, Cahir, Carrick-on-Suir and Clonmel. The route begins at its junction with the Limerick Southern M7 ring road (Junction 29).

Pallasgreen and Oola are two small villages through which the route passes before reaching Tipperary town. Before the town the road passes by Limerick Junction, a major railway intersection for the region where the Dublin-Cork and Dublin-Limerick lines meet. Bansha lies further southeast along the route, and the road passes under and then meets the M8 Cork–Dublin motorway at Junction 10 just outside Cahir. The N24 passes north of Cahir, turning east towards Clonmel. A bypass brings the road around the north of Clonmel. After Clonmel the N24 meets the N76 which leads to Kilkenny and the many towns and villages which the road passes or travels near. After the roundabout, the N24 continues east towards Carrick-on-Suir. From here the road undulates in an east/southeast/south direction to reach Waterford. The road ends at the start of the M9 motorway which heads to Dublin, Naas, Carlow, Kilkenny and Mullinavat.

== History ==
Due to its winding alignment between Clonmel and Cahir, the road now known as the N24 caused considerable annoyance to one "X.Z.", an anonymous Englishman who toured Ireland in the summer of 1782. "X.Z.", who was travelling from Dublin to Cork, had not seen fit to comment on the state of Ireland's roads until he left Clonmel for Cahir: "From Clonmel we rode west 8 miles to Cahir and here we first noticed the difference between Munster and Leinster roads: the roads in Munster are not carried on right lines, but wind about considerably in different places for no reason that we could find out, except it be in some places for the sake of mounting a few steep hills, which would be avoided if the roads were carried in a straight line – They seem the paths formerly trod by their ancestors, and are in some places paved and gravelled, in others in a natural state – Travelling on these accounts is very slow in Munster, especially if we go out of turnpike roads."

Between Cahir and its junction with the N76 east of Clonmel, the N24 once formed an integral part of the T6 – the old trunk road that connected the cities of Cork and Dublin before the contemporary numbering system was established.

== Proposed upgrades ==
It is proposed to upgrade most of this road to motorway standard. The proposed upgrade schemes include (east to west):

- Mooncoin Bypass
- Carrick-on-Suir Bypass
- Clonmel–Cahir Bypass
- Tipperary Town Bypass (N24 Pallasgreen to Bansha scheme and the N24 Cahir to Bansha scheme now N24 Pallasgreen–Cahir)
- Ballysimon (Limerick Bypass) to Pallasgreen

As of July 2013, all of these upgrade schemes were suspended.

== See also ==
- Roads in Ireland
- Motorways in the Republic of Ireland
- National secondary road
- Regional road
