= Galtymore =

Mountain in Tipperary/Limerick, Ireland

- Galty Mountains
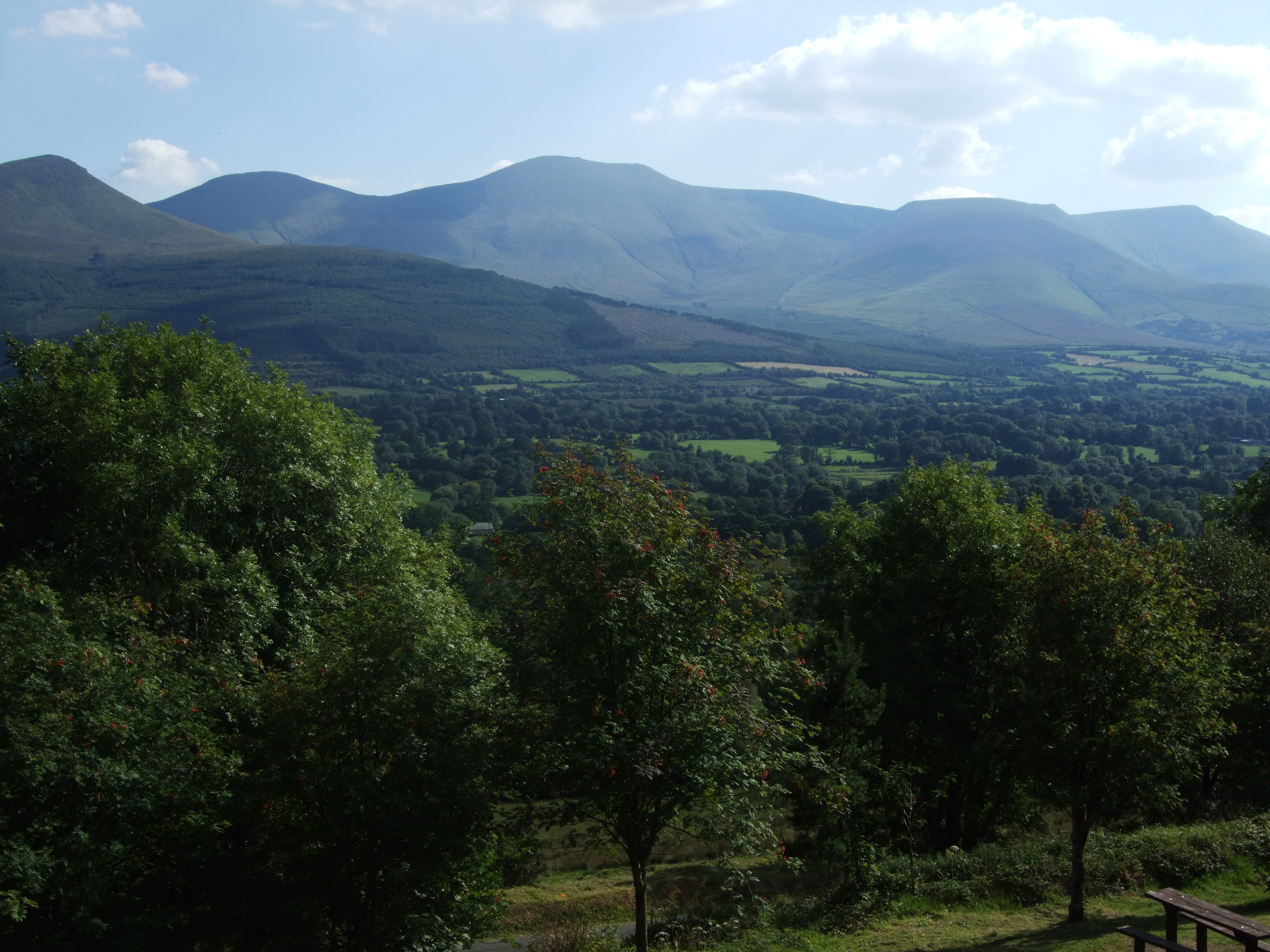
- Galtee Mountain range seen from the north, with the summit of Galteemore at its centre

Highest point
- Elevation: 917.9 m (3,011 ft)
- Prominence: 898 m (2,946 ft)
- Listing: County top (Limerick and Tipperary), P600, Marilyn, Furth, Hewitt, Arderin, Simm, Vandeleur-Lynam
- Coordinates: 52.365985°N 8.17915°W

Naming
- Native name: Cnoc Mór na nGaibhlte (Irish)
- English translation: 'big hill of the Galtees'
- Pronunciation: Irish: [ˌknˠɔk ˈmˠoːɾˠ n̪ˠə ˈŋa(vʲ)lʲtʲə]

Geography
- Location within island of Ireland
- Location: County Limerick/Tipperary, Ireland
- Parent range: Galty Mountains
- OSI/OSNI grid: R878237
- Topo map: OSi Discovery 74

Geology
- Rock age: Devonian
- Mountain type(s): Conglomerate & purple-reddish sandstone, (Slievenamuck Conglomerate Formation)

Climbing
- Easiest route: Black Road Route

Galtymore or Galteemore (Irish: Cnoc Mór na nGaibhlte, meaning 'big hill of the Galtees') is a mountain in the province of Munster, Ireland. At 917.9 metres (3,011 ft 6 in), it is one of Ireland's highest mountains, being the 12th-highest on the Arderin list, and 14th-highest on the Vandeleur-Lynam list. Galtymore has the 4th-highest topographic prominence of any peak in Ireland, which classifies Galtymore as a P600, or "major mountain". It is one of the 13 Irish Munros.

The Galtee mountains are formed from sandstone and shale and contain 24 peaks above 100 metres (330 ft). It runs east-west for thirty kilometres (20 mi) between counties Tipperary and Limerick; Galtymore is the highest point of both counties. The mountain is accessed by hillwalkers via the 3–4 hour Black Road Route, but is also summited as part of the longer 5–6 hour Circuit of Glencushnabinnia, and the at least 10–hour east-to-west crossing of the entire range, called the Galtee Crossing, which is climbed annually in the Galtee Challenge.

The mountain and its deep corrie lakes are associated with various Irish folklore tales regarding Saint Patrick and serpents.

== Naming ==
Irish academic Paul Tempan in his Irish Hill and Mountain Names Database (2010), listed "Galtymore" as the name for the peak, and "Galty Mountains" as the name for the range. This is anglicised from Irish: Cnoc Mór na nGaibhlte, meaning 'big hill of the Galtees'. "Galtymore" is recorded as early as the Civil Survey of Co. Tipperary (Down Survey, 1654–56) as a boundary feature of the barony of Clanwilliam. The peak is named "Galtymore Mountain" on the Ordnance Survey Ireland Discovery Map. The townland on its southern slopes is named Knocknagalty (Cnoc na nGaibhlte).

Some guidebooks and other publications suggest that the name "Galty" or "Galtees" is an anglicisation of Sléibhte na gCoillte (mountains of the forests). The 19th century diarist Amhlaoibh Ó Súilleabháin recorded a different Irish name, Beann na nGaillti, and the names of three nearby places are derived from this: Glencoshnabinnia (P. W. Joyce, Irish Names of Places iii, 366), Slievecoshnabinnia and Carrignabinnia.

The range was historically named Sliabh gCrot (the hump mountains), anglicised as "Slievegrot"; or Crotta Cliach (the humps of Cliú), after the territory of Cliú.

The summit of Galtymore is marked as Dawson's Table, named after the Dawson-Massey family who were large landowners in the area (Tipperary Directory 1889), owning much of the land on and around the north section of the Galty range. (Note: The 126,000-acre [51,000-hectare] Dawson-Massey estate was centered on Ballynacourty House in the Glen of Aherlow, on the northern side of the Galty Mountains. It was destroyed by fire during the Irish Civil War in 1922.)

The area also originated Kerry Group's popular bacon food brand Galtee; and the term Galtee Mountains is still in common use.

== Geology ==
The geology of the Galty Mountains is described as being Old Red Sandstone, from the Devonian period, and Silurian shales. Old Red Sandstone is also common in the MacGillycuddy's Reeks mountain range, and as well as having a purple–reddish colour, is also devoid of fossils.

The southern smooth slopes of the Galty range give way to a steep northern face, pocked with deep corries and their accompanying moraine lakes. The long central ridge of the Galtys, which runs for about 15 kilometres (9 mi) in an east-west direction, was too high to be overridden by the inland ice-sheets, and although it resulted in the creation of small corrie glaciers, its summits are capped by tors formed from conglomerate rock (known as the Slievenamuck Conglomerate Formation).

== Geography ==
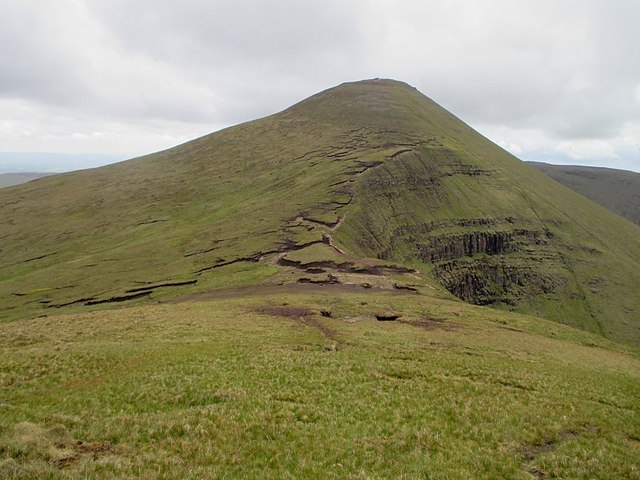
Galtymore's eastern summit ridge (centre), and northern cliffs (right)

The climbing guidebook writer Paddy Dillion said of the range: "the lofty Galty Mountains have forested flanks; and there is much heather, bogs, and steep slopes, but the effort is worth it and Galtymore is a splendid viewpoint".

The Galty (or "Galtee") Mountains are a broadly straight 30-kilometre (20 mi) east-west grass-covered range with a 15-kilometre (9 mi) central ridge section, stretching from Greenane 801 metres (2,628 ft) in the east, to Temple Hill 783 metres (2,569 ft) in the west. This central ridge section includes the highest peaks of Galtymore 918 metres (3,012 ft), Lyracappul 825 metres (2,707 ft), Carrignabinnia 823 metres (2,700 ft), and Slievecushnabinnia 775 metres (2,543 ft). Many of the peaks of the central section have a moderate topographical prominence, which means that the central ridge maintains a reasonably sustained height; an attractive feature for hill walkers.

The 24 peaks of the Galty range with a height above 100 metres (330 ft), and include 13 peaks with a height above 610 metres (2,000 ft), and five that are classified as Marilyns – being peaks with a prominence above 150 metres (490 ft). The Galtys are described as Ireland's highest "inland" range.

Galtymore and Galtybeg sit near the middle of the range and their north faces show evidence of glacial erosion with a number of deep corries, most of which are now occupied by loughs. Between Galtymore and Galtybeg lies Lough Diheen, while Lough Curra lies between Galtymore and Slievecushnabinnia.

Galtymore is the 460th-highest mountain, and 12th most prominent mountain, in Britain and Ireland, on the Simms classification. Galtymore is regarded by the Scottish Mountaineering Club (SMC) as one of 34 Furths, which is a mountain above 3,000 ft (914.4 m) in elevation, and meeting the other SMC criteria for a Munro (e.g. "sufficient separation"), and which are outside (or furth), of Scotland; this is why Carrauntoohil is also referred to as one of the thirteen Irish Munros. Galtymore's prominence qualifies it as a P600, which classes Galtymore as a "major" mountain in Britain and Ireland. Galtymore ranks as the 5th-highest mountain in Ireland on the MountainViews Online Database, 100 Highest Irish Mountains, where the prominence threshold is 100 metres (330 ft).

== Hill walking ==
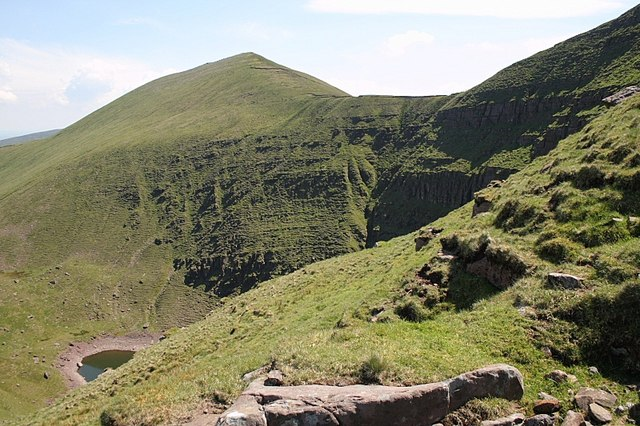
Galtybeg and Lough Dihneen, part of the Circuit of Glencushnabinnia

The most straightforward route to the summit of Galtymore is from the south via the nine-kilometre (5 1/2 mi) 3–4 hour Black Road Route, which starts at the end of the Black Road car park (R893204) (accessed from the R639 road near the village of Skeheenarinky), and summits Galtybeg 799 metres (2,621 ft), before the main summit of Galtymore. It then retraces its route back to the Black Road car park.

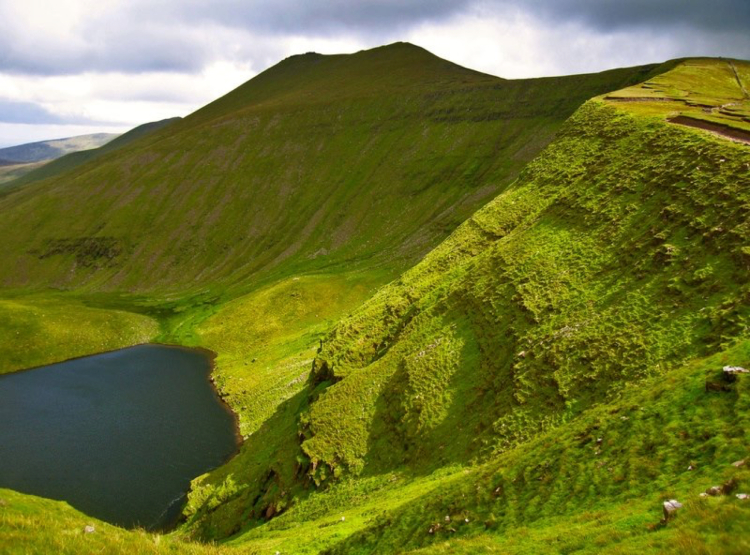
Lough Curra below Galtymore, on the Circuit of Glencushnabinnia, as seen from Slievecushnabinnia; "twin summits" of Galtymore visible

The 12-kilometre (7 1/2 mi) 5–6 hour Circuit of Glencushnabinnia, which follows a loop around Galtymore's deep northern corries at Lough Curra and Lough Dihneen, is described as the "connoisseur's route". It starts at the forest car park (R875278) near the Clydagh Bridge in the north, and climbs Cush 641 metres (2,103 ft), Galtybeg 779 metres (2,556 ft), Galtymore and Slievecushnabinnia 775 metres (2,543 ft), before returning to the start (it can also be done anti–clockwise).

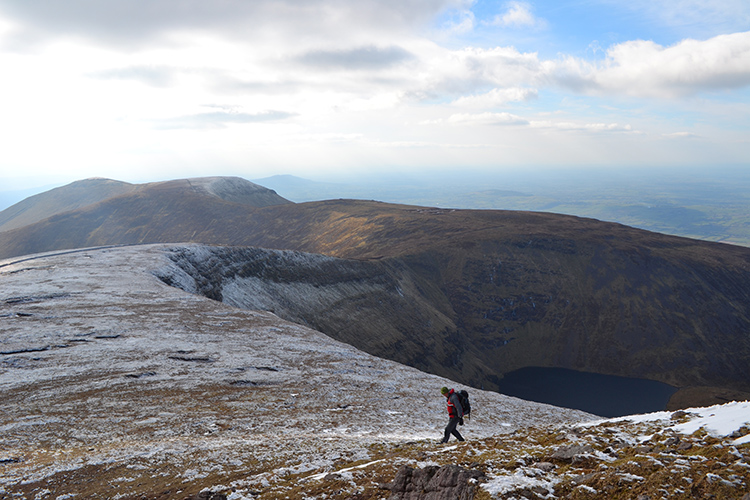
Western Galtys of (after a right turn) Slievecushnabinnia, Carrignabinnia, and Lyracappul (farthest); Lough Curra is in the deep corrie (near right)

The annual Galtee Challenge organised by the Galtee Walking Club is the full 31-kilometre (19 1/2 mi), over 10-hour, east-to-west crossing of the range (also called the Galtee Crossing), and takes in all major peaks of the Galty Mountains. The challenge normally starts in Cahir in the east, and finishes in Anglesboro Village, in the west. Despite the distance, longer than the MacGillycuddy's Reeks Ridge Walk, the 10–hour estimate is reasonable as the variation in elevation is moderate.

== List of peaks ==
The MountainViews Online Database list 24 Galty mountain peaks with an elevation, or height, above 100 metres (330 ft).

Furth (or Irish Munro): Height over 3,000 feet (914 m), and on the SMC Furth list.
Marilyn: Any height, and prominence over 150 metres (492 ft).

Peaks of the Galty Mountains (MountainViews Online Database, October 2018)
Height rank	Prom. rank	Name	Irish name (if different)	Translation	Height (m)	Prom. (m)	Height (ft)	Prom. (ft)	Topo. map	OSI Grid Reference
1	1	Galtymore	Cnoc Mór na nGaibhlte	big hill of the Galtys	918	898	3,011	2,946	74	R878238
2	6	Lyracappul	Ladhar an Chapaill	fork/confluence of the horse (Note: This peak may be named after the channels on its north–western slopes. The glen here is named Lyraveg Glen.)	825	100	2,708	328	74	R845232
3	22	Carrignabinnia	Carraig na Binne	rock of the peak	823	27	2,700	88	74	R850237
4	5	Greenane	An Grianán	sunny spot	801	157	2,629	515	74	R925239
5	9	Galtybeg	Cnoc Beag na nGaibhlte	The small hill of the Galtys	799	80	2,622	263	74	R890241
6	16	Greenane West	—	—	787	39	2,582	129	74	R910239
7	3	Temple Hill	Cnoc an Teampaill	hill of the church	783	188	2,569	617	74	R833218
8	20	Slievecushnabinnia	Sliabh Chois na Binne	mountain beside the peak (Note: P. W. Joyce suggests that the peak (binn) in question is Galtymore, which seems logical. Glencushabinnia is a townland north-east of here.)	775	28	2,542	92	74	R858240
9	13	Knockaterriff	Cnoc an Tairbh	hill of the bull	692	51	2,269	168	74	R848216
10	21	Knockaterriff Beg	Cnoc an Tairbh Beag	hill of the little bull	679	28	2,229	91	74	R844222
11	4	Cush	Cois	side/flank (Note: The name may well be a shortened form of Cois na Binne, which appears in several place-names in this area. This mountain is referred to as Binnia in 'The Mountains of Ireland' by Paddy Dillon.)	641	176	2,104	578	74	R894262
12	7	Monabrack	Móin Bhreac	speckled moor (Note: On the Discovery map the name Monabrack does not appear. The name Carrigeen Mountain is in roughly the same position but this is a townland name (i.e. the mountain pasture belonging to Carrigeen townland). Previously Lyracappul SE Top in earlier MountainViews listings.)	630	94	2,067	308	74	R859219
13	18	Laghtshanaquilla	Leacht Sheanchoille	burial monument of the old wood (Note: This peak is unnamed on the Discovery map. There is a cairn near the summit, which could be the leacht in question. Previously Greenane East in earlier MountainViews listings.)	629	36	2,065	118	74	R951250
14	11	Knockeenatoung	Cnoicín na Teanga	hill of the tongue	601	66	1,973	218	74	R895219
15	23	Lough Curra Mtn	—	—	600	23	1,970	75	74	R869242
16	24	Laghtshanaquilla North-East Top	—	—	598	19	1,962	62	74	R957256
17	10	Knockastakeen	Cnoc an Stáicín	hill of the little stack (Note: Stáca can be a stack of hay or corn. The name appears to refer to the hill's shape.)	583	78	1,913	256	74	R915258
18	14	Sturrakeen	An Starraicín	"the pointed peak" or "the steeple" (Note: Also known as Carrigphierish, Ir. Carraig Phiarais, 'Pierce's rock'. Note that this peak is actually unnamed on the Discovery map, while both Carrigphierish and Sturrakeen are marked a little to the northwest of this peak.)	542	46	1,777	151	74	R973253
19	8	Benard	An Bhinn Ard	the high peak	480	85	1,573	277	74	R821199
20	12	Slieveanard NE Top	—	—	449	64	1,471	210	74	S005264
21	15	Seefin	Suí Finn	Fionn's seat	447	42	1,465	136	74	R891197
22	17	Seefin N Top	—	—	444	39	1,457	128	74	R888206
23	19	Slieveanard	Sliabh an Aird	mountain of the height	438	33	1,436	108	74	R992258
24	2	Slievenamuck	Sliabh Muice	mountain of the pig	369	234	1,211	768	66	R842306

== Summit ==
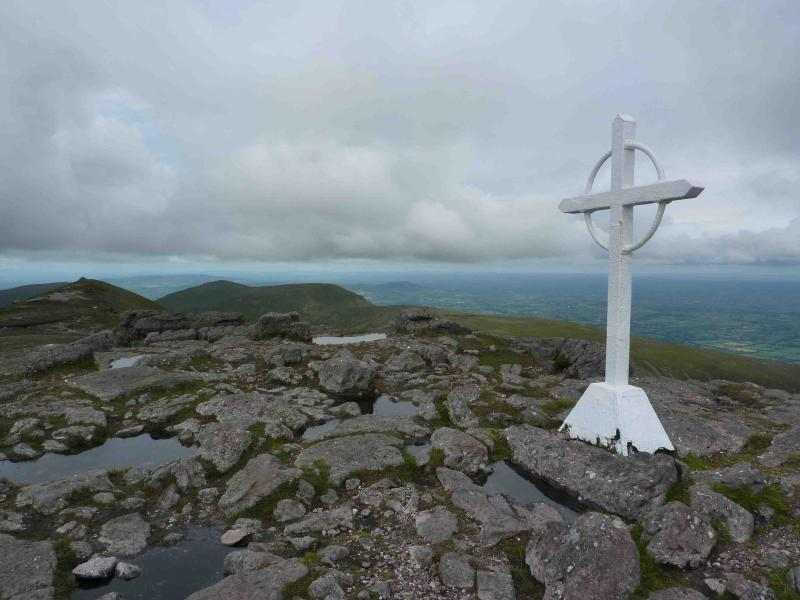
White iron cross on Dawson's Table, Galtymore summit

Galtymore's summit is described a large concave plateau separated by two peaks. The plateau consists of Old Red Sandstone and is known as Dawson's Table after the historical landowners, the Dawson-Massey family. This is similar to Percy's Table on the summit of Lugnaquilla, the highest mountain in County Wicklow and Leinster. There is a cairn on top of each peak and the eastern one marks the true summit of Galtymore. These twin summits give Galtymore a distinctive profile from a distance. The summit of Galtymore marks the boundary of Limerick and Tipperary.

In 1975, a 2.1-metre (7 ft) white reinforced-iron cross was erected on the north edge of Dawson's Table by Tipperary local Ted Kavanagh. The cross is situated a few metres away from the eastern summit cairn and looks into the glen of Aherlow. It required carrying around half a ton of material up the mountain to build, and is kept white by being painted every year. The steel cross replaced an earlier wooden cross which was erected in 1954 by a local group of climbers, and which by the 70s had fallen into disrepair.

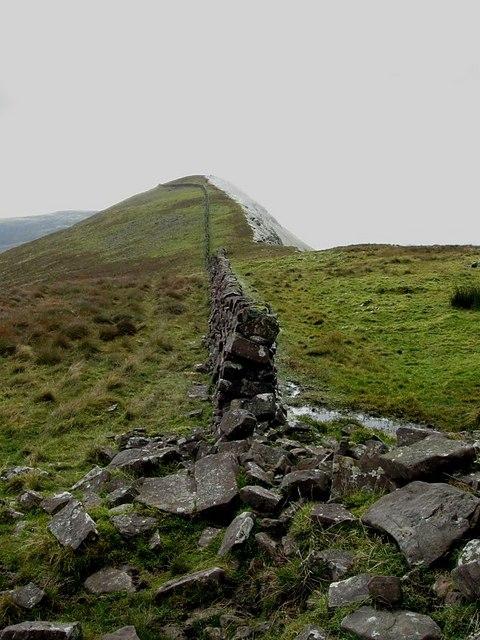
The Galtee Wall leading westwards to the summit of Lyracappul

To the west of the summit of Galtymore lies a 3.5-kilometre-long (2 1/4 mi) dry stone wall known as the Galtee Wall, that was built in 1878 to separate the Dawson-Massey Estate in the north, from the Galtee Castle Estate in the south. It is recorded that it took 30–40 men more than 4 years to complete the wall, and that the reason for its construction was to give employment to local small farmers during a period of economic depression (hence why is it also called a famine wall). The Galtee Wall runs from below the west summit of Galtymore, across the top of Slievecushnabinnia, the top of Carrignabinnia, and on to the summit of Lyracappul, the second-highest peak in the Galtees.

== Folklore ==
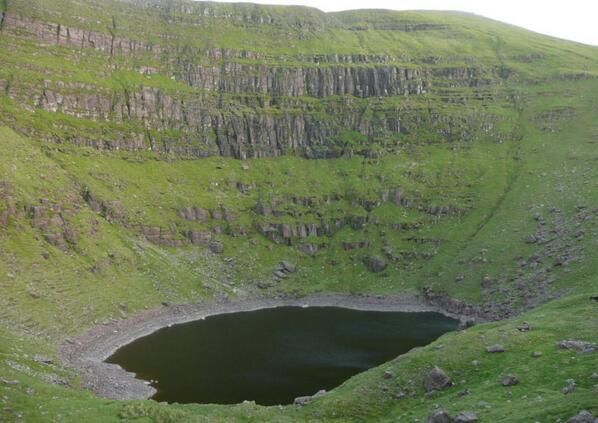
Lough Dihneen

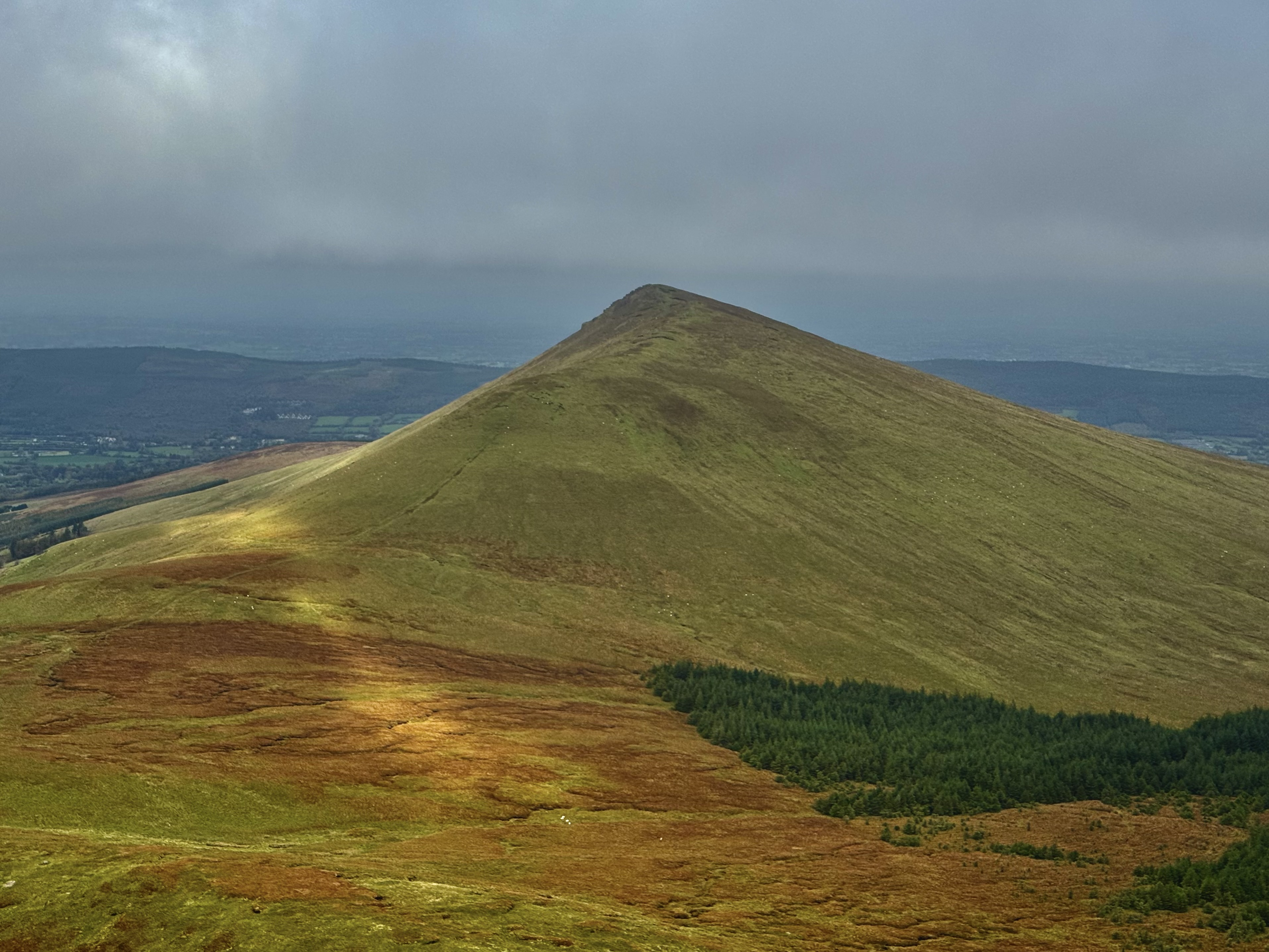
Cush (Irish: Cois) Mountain as seen from the col between Galtymore and Galtybeg

The mountains appear in Irish folk tales, and the deep corrie lakes of the Galtys were believed to be enchanted. In early Irish literature, the mountains are called [Sliab] Crotta Cliach (the [mountain] humps of Cliú), which was the name of the surrounding territory. As crotta can also mean a celtic harp, the name was interpreted as "mountains of Cliach's harps", and there is a tale of a legendary harper called Cliach playing his harps in the mountains to woo an otherworldly woman who lived in the summit cairn on Slievenamon. After failing, he plays his two harps together, and the hill bursts open and forms a lake. This lake is Lough Muskry, which is named after the Múscraige people that lived in the south of Ireland.

Lake Muskry was formerly known as Loch Béal Séad (lake of the jewel mouth) and also as Loch Béal Dracon (lake of the dragon's mouth). The oldest mention of the name is in the tale entitled Aislinge Óenguso (The Dream of Aengus) which dates from c.750 AD. This states: Mac Og went to Loch Bél Draccon when he saw the 150 white birds at the loch with their silvery chains and golden caps around their heads. The next oldest mention is in the Dindsenchas, composed c.1000. The Metrical Dindsenchas of Crotta Cliach states: At the spot where he died of terror, Cliach sang sweet melody; there seized him there suddenly, not unprotected, the loathly dragon that dwells in this place - Loch Bel Dragon. The Rennes Dindsenchas also relates a further tale of Saint Fursey drowning the dragon in the lake. There is a folk tale of a serpent that was killing livestock on the Galty Mountains being banished by Saint Patrick and confined to Lake Muskry. According to the tale, Saint Patrick chained the serpent under the lake and promised to release the creature on Lá an Luan (the Day of Judgement), which the serpent mistook as An Luain (Monday or Easter Monday). The serpent comes up each Easter Monday and asks "Is it the Monday morning yet Patrick?" and Patrick says "No", and the serpent goes down again for another year. The same legend is also associated with Lough Diheen, below Galtybeg. The belief in the serpent under Lough Diheen was held so strongly that a Captain Dawson, a local landlord, attempted to drain Lough Diheen in the 1830s to kill the serpent.

Folk tales attribute the banishing of the serpent by Saint Patrick with the subsequent richness of farming in the area. In addition to local folklore, Lake Muskry also features in the Irish mythological tale of the Caer Ibormeith.

== 1976 air crash ==
On 20 September 1976, three airmen, Tom Gannon, Jimmy Byrne and Dick O'Reilly from Abbeyshrule, were killed when their plane crashed not far from O'Loughlin's Castle, a rock–formation near Greenane West, on the Galtys. The three were founding members of Abbyshrule Air Club. A stone monument in the shape of a plane's tailfin was erected (R393223) a short distance into the Black Road Route on the path to Knockeenatoung. The crash led to the founding of the South Eastern Mountain Rescue Association (SEMRA) in 1977. The event was remembered on its 40th anniversary by SEMRA in September 2016.
