= Tipperary (town) =

Town in County Tipperary, Ireland

Tipperary Tiobraid Árann (Irish)
- Town
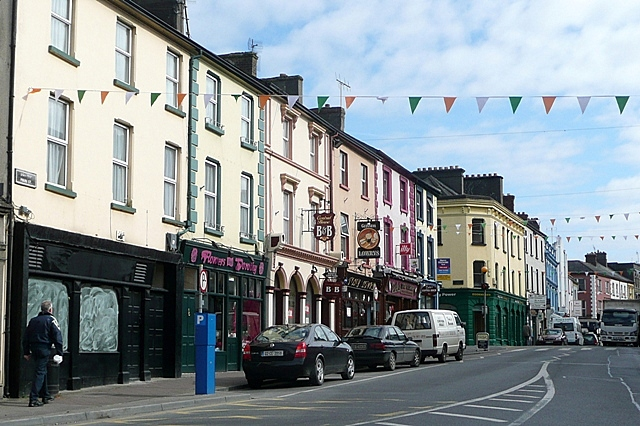
- Main Street, Tipperary

- Coat of arms
- Nicknames: Tipp Town, Tipp
- Motto: Irish: Creideamh, Tírghrá, Saoirse (Faith, Patriotism, Freedom)
- Location in Ireland
- Coordinates: 52°28′26″N 8°09′43″W
- Country: Ireland
- Province: Munster
- County: Tipperary
- Dáil constituency: Tipperary South
- EU Parliament: South constituency
- Elevation: 102 m (335 ft)

Population (2022)
  - Total: 5,387
- Time zone: UTC0 (WET)
  - Summer (DST): UTC+1 (IST)
- Eircode: E34
- Area code: 062
- Irish Grid Reference: R889358

Tipperary (/ˌtɪpəˈrɛəri/; Irish: Tiobraid Árann, meaning 'well of the Ara'), commonly known as Tipperary Town, is a town and a civil parish in County Tipperary, Ireland. It had a population of 5,387 as of the 2022 census. It is also an ecclesiastical parish in the Roman Catholic Archdiocese of Cashel and Emly, and is in the historical barony of Clanwilliam. The town gave its name to County Tipperary.

== History ==
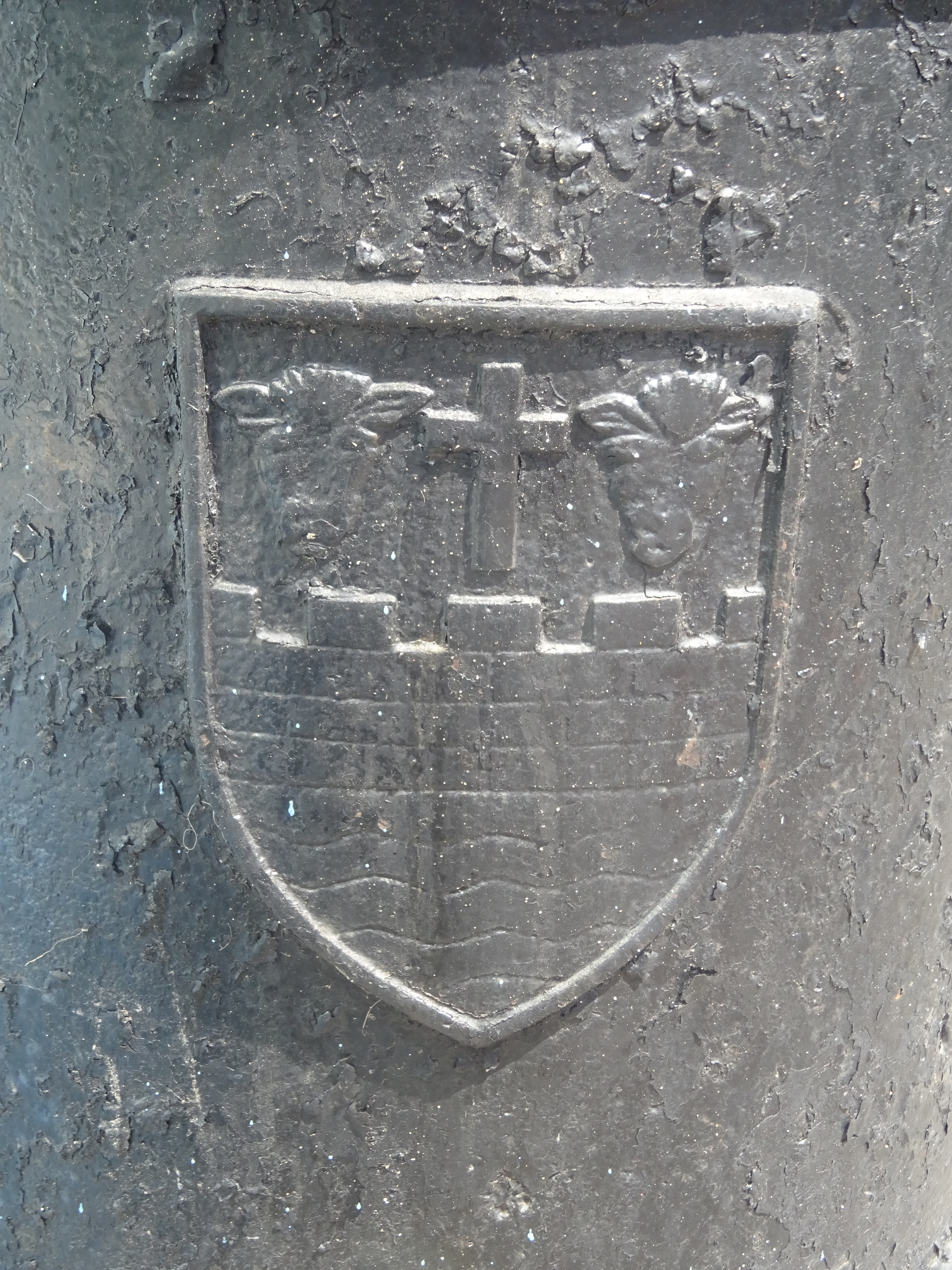
Arms of Tipperary town in metalwork: Per fess vert and barry wavy azure and argent a fess masoned and embattled of the third and in chief a passion cross between two cow's heads cabossed or.

Historical population
Year	Pop.	±%
1821	6,348	—
1831	6,972	+9.8%
1841	7,370	+5.7%
1851	6,816	−7.5%
1861	5,864	−14.0%
1871	5,638	−3.9%
1881	7,274	+29.0%
1891	6,391	−12.1%
1901	6,281	−1.7%
1911	6,645	+5.8%
1926	5,555	−16.4%
1936	5,384	−3.1%
1946	5,267	−2.2%
1951	5,148	−2.3%
1956	4,790	−7.0%
1961	4,684	−2.2%
1966	4,507	−3.8%
1971	4,717	+4.7%
1981	5,169	+9.6%
1986	5,209	+0.8%
1991	4,983	−4.3%
1996	4,854	−2.6%
2002	4,964	+2.3%
2006	5,065	+2.0%
2011	5,310	+4.8%
2016	4,979	−6.2%
2022	5,387	+8.2%

In Irish, "Tiobraid Árann" means "The Well of Ara"—a reference to the River Ara that flows through the town. The well is located in the townland of Glenbane, which is in the parish of Lattin and Cullen. This is where the River Ara rises. Little is known of the historical significance of the well.

The town had a medieval foundation and became a population centre in the early 13th century. Its ancient fortifications have disappeared, often dismantled to be reused in new buildings. Its central area is characterized by wide streets radiating from the principal thoroughfare of Main Street.

Two historical monuments are located in the Main Street. One is a bronze statue of Charles Kickham (poet and patriot). The other is the Maid of Erin statue, erected to commemorate the Irish patriots, Allen, Larkin and O'Brien, who are collectively known as the Manchester Martyrs. The Maid of Erin is a freestanding monument; erected in 1907, it was relocated to a corner site on the main street in 2003. It is made of carved limestone. A woman stands on a base depicting the portraits of the three executed men. The portraits carry the names in Irish of each man. The statue is now situated on stone-flagged pavement behind wrought-iron railings, with an information board. This memorial to the Manchester Martyrs is a landmark piece of sculpture now located in a prominent corner site. The choice of a female figure as the personification of Ireland for such a memorial was common at the time. It is a naturalistic and evocative piece of work, made all the more striking by the lifelike portraits of the executed men.

Between 1874 and 1878, a large British Army barracks was constructed in the town. The installation served as a training centre for soldiers during World War I. During the Irish War of Independence, the barracks served as a base for the Black and Tans. The first engagement of the Irish War of Independence took place at nearby Solloghead Beg Quarry on 21 January 1919 when Dan Breen and Seán Treacy led a group of IRA volunteers in an attack against Royal Irish Constabulary members who were transporting gelignite.

On 30 September 2005, President of Ireland Mary McAleese, in a gesture of reconciliation, unveiled the newly refurbished Memorial Arch of the barracks in the presence of several ambassadors and foreign emissaries, military attachés and town dignitaries; a detachment of the Local Defence Force, the Number 1 Irish Army Band and various ex-service organisations paraded. In a rare appearance, the Royal Munster Fusiliers banner was carried to mark the occasion. The Arch is the only remaining porch of what was the officers' mess and has panels mounted bearing the names of fallen members of the Irish, American, British and Australian militaries. The Arch was renovated and maintained by the Tipperary Remembrance Trust.

=== New Tipperary ===
In 1888–89, tenants of the local landlord, Arthur Smith Barry, withheld their rents in solidarity with his tenants in County Cork. They were evicted. Led by Fr. David Humphreys and William O'Brien, they decided to build a new town on land outside Barry's control. The area now known Dillon Street and Emmet Street in Tipperary town was the centre of this development. It was built by local labour but with funds raised in Australia and the United States.

The high point was 12 April 1890, when a row of shops called the William O'Brien Arcade was opened, providing shops for some of the business people who had been evicted from the centre of the town. Eventually, compromise was reached, and the tenants returned to the 'Old Tipperary'.

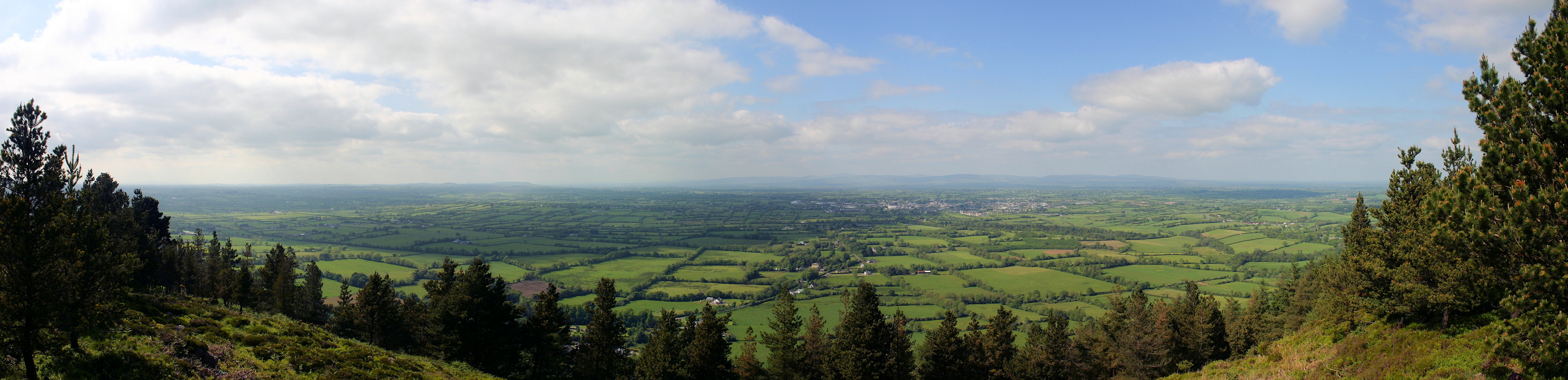
Panoramic view of Tipperary and surroundings

== Transportation ==
=== Roads ===
The town is situated on the N24 route between Limerick city and Waterford city.

=== Railway access ===
Tipperary railway station is on the Limerick to Waterford line and has two services a day to Waterford via Cahir, Clonmel and Carrick on Suir. Two trains a day also operate to Limerick Junction which has numerous services to Cork, Dublin Heuston and Limerick and onward connections to Ennis, Athenry and Galway. There is no train service to/from Tipperary on Sundays. Tipperary railway station opened 9 May 1848.

== Amenities ==
It is home to Tipperary Racecourse, which is located at Limerick Junction. It has a large agricultural catchment area in west Tipperary and east County Limerick and was historically a significant market town. Today, it still boasts large butter making and milk processing industries. The town is sometimes erroneously believed to be the county seat; this honour belongs instead to Clonmel.

== Notable people ==
- Peter Campbell (naval officer), founder of the Uruguayan navy.
- Dr. Liam Hennessy, exercise physiologist, strength and conditioning coach, and former international athlete.
- Mick Kinane, jockey.
- Shane Long, Irish international and Premier League football player played for St. Michael's.
- Michael F. O'Connell, member of the Wisconsin State Assembly.
- Alan Quinlan, the Munster Rugby player was born in Tipperary in 1974.
- George Roupell, Victoria Cross recipient.
- Laurence Sterne, novelist.
- George Thomas (soldier), the Raja from Tiperary, Irish adventurer who established an independent kingdom at Hansi in India.
- John Walsh, soldier in the Union Army during the American Civil War, earning the Medal of Honor.

== Tipperary International Peace Award ==
Created by locals in an attempt to counter the association between Tipperary and war created by the song It's a long way to Tipperary, the Tipperary International Peace Award, described as "Ireland's outstanding award for humanitarian work", has been awarded annually by the Tipperary Peace Convention since the inaugural award to Seán MacBride in 1984. Among the other recipients are Live Aid founder Bob Geldof for 1985, Irish senator and peace campaigner Gordon Wilson for 1987, former Soviet General Secretary Mikhail Gorbachev for 1988, South African president Nelson Mandela for 1989, former US president Bill Clinton for 2000, former New York mayor Rudy Giuliani for 2001, John O’Shea, founder of the charity Goal for 2003, Pakistani president Benazir Bhutto for 2007, US Senator Edward Kennedy for 2009, Afghan human rights campaigner Dr Sima Samar for 2010, former Irish president, Mary McAleese and her husband, senator Martin McAleese for 2011, Pakistani activist for female education and youngest-ever Nobel Prize laureate Malala Yousafzai for 2012, former US envoy to Northern Ireland Richard Haass for 2013, the former UN Secretary General Ban Ki-moon for 2014, and Colombian president Juan Manuel Santos for 2017.

== Twin towns ==
- Mautern in Steiermark, Austria (since 2006)
- Parthenay, France

== See also ==
- List of towns and villages in Ireland
