= Clonkeen Church =

- Teampall Chluain Caoin
- Location within Ireland
- 52.6439°N 8.4599°W
- Location: Clonkeen (Barrington), Murroe, County Limerick
- Country: Ireland
- Denomination: Catholic (pre-Reformation)

History
- Founded: c. AD 600
- Founder: Saint Mo-Diomog

Architecture
- Functional status: inactive
- Years built: 15th century AD

Specifications
- Length: 14.6 m (48 ft)
- Width: 5.5 m (18 ft)
- Materials: stone, mortar

Administration
- Diocese: Cashel and Emly
Designations
National monument of Ireland
- Official name: Clonkeen Church
- Reference no.: 84

Clonkeen Church is a medieval church and a National Monument in County Limerick, Ireland.

== Location ==
The church is located on the R506 road, near Barringtonsbridge approximately 6 km (3.7 mi) southeast of Annacotty, north of the River Mulkear.

== History ==
A monastery was founded here by Saint Mo-Diomog (feast day 10 December) in the 6th or 7th century. The present church dates to the mid-12th century (based on its similarity to Aghadoe Cathedral, dated to 1158).

The church was ruined by 1657.

== Church ==
Clonkeen Church is a small rectangular church with antae at the east and west ends. The west part of the church, incorporating the west doorway is Romanesque, built of roughly coursed large stones, mostly sandstone. It has a well-preserved doorway with an arch of three orders, with Romanesque carving around the jambs.

The capitals and columns with chevrons are similar to those at Aghadoe.
