= Silvermines =

Village in County Tipperary, Ireland

Silvermines Irish: Béal Átha Gabhann
- Village
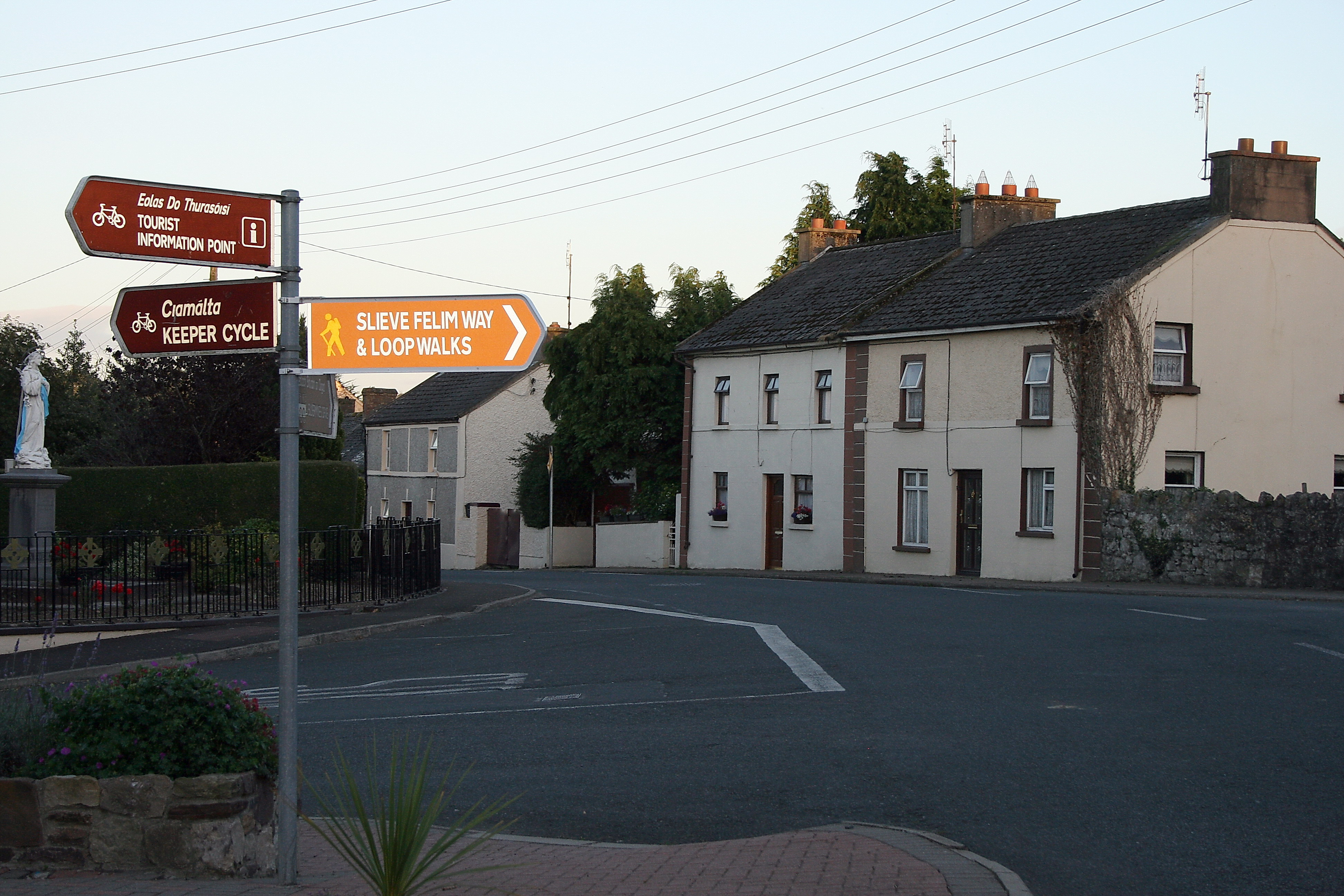
- Silvermines village at dusk

- Location in Ireland
- Coordinates: 52°47′35″N 8°14′13″W
- Country: Ireland
- Province: Munster
- County: County Tipperary

Population (2022)
  - Total: 301
- Time zone: UTC+0 (WET)
  - Summer (DST): UTC-1 (IST (WEST))
- Irish Grid Reference: R840713

Silvermines, historically known as Bellagowan (Irish: Béal Átha Gabhann), is a village in County Tipperary in Ireland. It lies immediately north of the Silvermine mountain range and takes its name from the extensive mines of lead, zinc, copper, baryte and silver nearby. Towards the very south of the Silvermine Mountains is the highest peak in the mountains, Keeper Hill (Irish: Sliabh Cimeálta), which rises to 695m, dominating the area. Silvermines village is located near the town of Nenagh on the R499 regional road. It is a parish in the Roman Catholic Diocese of Killaloe and is also in the historical barony of Ormond Upper.

== History ==
=== Early history ===
Evidence of ancient settlement in the area includes a number of ringfort, castle and bawn sites in the townlands of Ballygown South, Gortshaneroe and Cloonanagh. Historically known as Bellagowen or Ballygown (from Irish Béal Átha Gabhann, meaning 'approach to the ford of the smith', the area has been named for its association with the nearby Silvermines since at least the 17th century. The village itself largely dates from development in the late 18th century.

=== Mining heritage ===
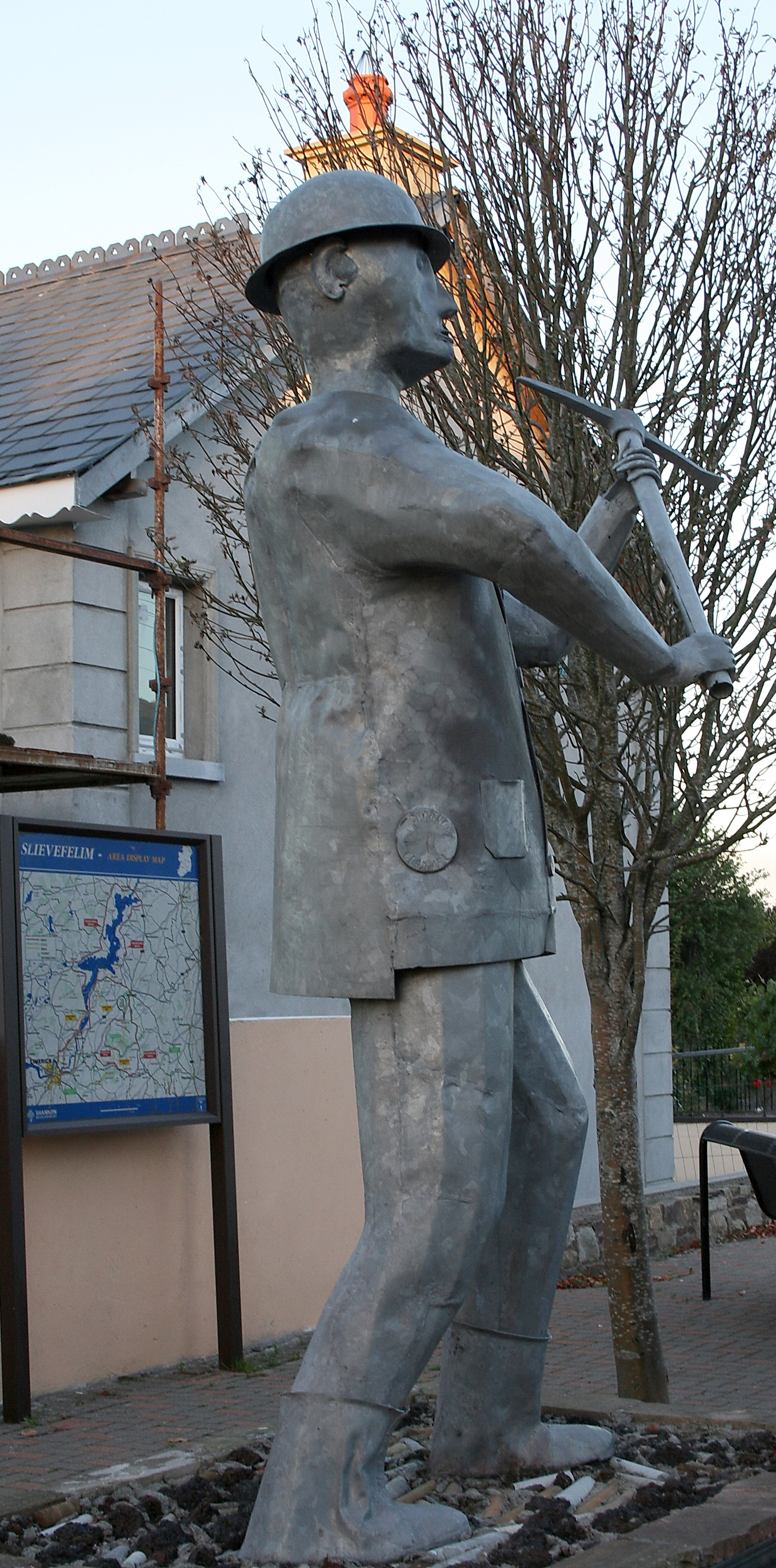
Monument commemorating local miners

Some records suggest that there was mining in the district as early as the 13th or 14th century. However, this may have been short-lived.

Mining resumed in the 17th century and continued intermittently until the late 19th century. A number of ruined industrial buildings in the area date from the late 1880s.

Mining activity restarted in 1949, and shortly after a world-class deposit of baryte was found and opencast mining of this began in 1963 by Magcobar (Ireland) Ltd. Soon after a multi-million-tonne orebody grading about 11% combined lead and zinc was also discovered. This was worked underground from 1968 to 1982 by Mogul of Ireland Ltd. The Magcobar mine closed in September 1992, and its extensive spoil heaps are a prominent local landmark, visible for miles. The Mogul mine became well known for the quality of the mineral specimens it produced, particularly of the ore minerals galena and sphalerite.

The area's Old Smelting House, now a ruin, is listed as a protected structure by Tipperary County Council (RPS Ref S477).

In the 21st century, the area was the subject as some media attention as the integrity of the village's water supply was threatened by pollution from the tailings left behind at the mine.

== Transport ==
While previously served by a freight-only siding from the Limerick to Ballybrophy Railway, freight trains no longer serve Silvermines.

Since March 2025, Local Link route 854 provides several journeys daily (including on Sundays and public holidays) from the village to Nenagh and Roscrea. On Fridays only, Bus Éireann route 323 from Newport, County Tipperary to Nenagh also serves the village.

The Slieve Felim Way, a 43 kilometres (27 miles) National Waymarked Trail through the Silvermine and Slieve Felim Mountains, has a trail-head in the village.

== See also ==
- List of towns and villages in Ireland
