= R507 road =

R507 road may refer to:

- R507 road (Ireland)
- R507 road (South Africa)
