= Killeenagarriff =

Civil parish in County Limerick, Ireland

Coordinates: 52.66°N 8.48°W

Killeenagarriff (Irish: Cill Mhic Con Ghairbh, meaning 'church of the son of Cú Garbh') is a civil parish in the historical barony of Clanwilliam in County Limerick, Ireland. Settlements in Killeenagarriff include the town of Annacotty, and population centres at Ahane and Barringtonsbridge.

The Roman Catholic church at Ahane, built in the mid-1830s and dedicated to Saint Patrick, was described in Samuel Lewis's Topographical Dictionary of Ireland (1837) as a "large new chapel". Its construction is reputed to contain a doorcase "reclaimed" from the ruins of Quin Abbey in neighbouring County Clare. Thornfield House, also in Ahane and dating from at least the early 19th century, was the home of General Richard Bourke, who retired there after a term as Governor of New South Wales in Australia.

Barringtonsbridge, which spans into the neighbouring parish of Clonkeen, is a small settlement which developed near a metal bridge. This metal bridge was built, by the Barrington family, in the early 19th century over the Killeengarriff River.

Killeenagarriff Church, a small ruined medieval church in Killeenagarriff townland, is sited in a churchyard which is bounded by the Killeengarriff River. The Killeenagarriff River later joins the Mulkear River.

== See also ==
- Clonkeen Church (near Barringtonsbridge in neighbouring Clonkeen parish)
