= Murroe =

Village in County Limerick, Ireland

Murroe Irish: Maigh Rua
- Village
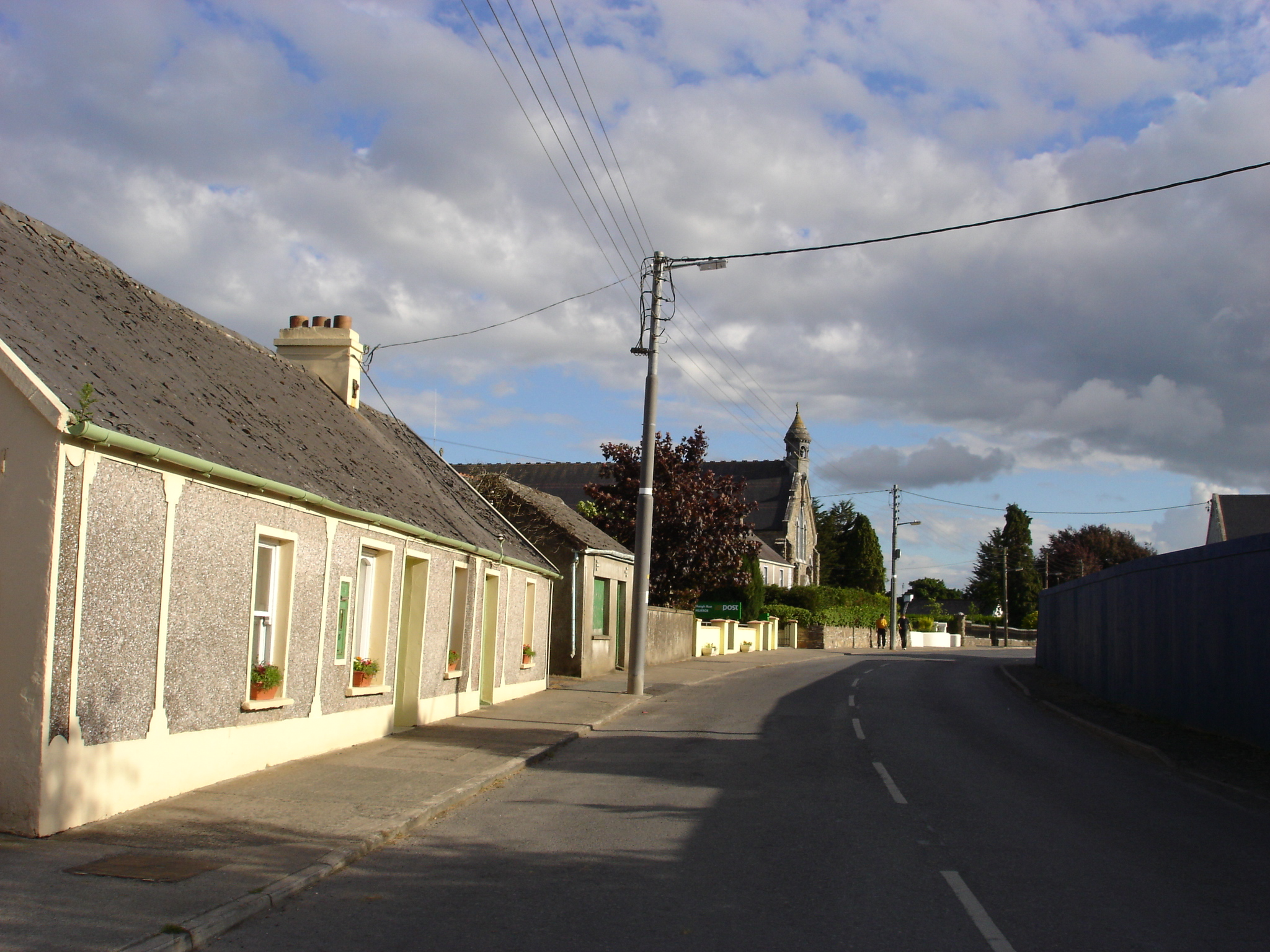
- Main Street

- Location in Ireland
- Coordinates: 52°39′N 8°24′W
- Country: Ireland
- Province: Munster
- County: County Limerick
- Elevation: 80 m (260 ft)

Population (2022)
  - Total: 1,432
- Irish Grid Reference: R727555

Murroe /məˈruː/ (Irish: Maigh Rua, meaning 'red plain'), officially spelt Moroe, is a village in County Limerick, Ireland.

== Environs ==
Murroe is in the north-eastern part of County Limerick, surrounded by the Slieve Felim Mountains. It is around 15 km east of Limerick city and close to the County Tipperary border. Nearby towns include Cappamore and Newport. The village is on the R506 road.

The village developed as an estate village serving the neighbouring Glenstal estate, growing in a linear pattern from the crossroads towards the gates of the demesne. The village forge, built of random-cut stone, is an exception to the general building pattern of the village.

== History ==
The first Roman Catholic church was erected in Murroe village around 1731. This was replaced by a second church on the main street in 1807. The parish priest in 1808 was Daniel O'Brien. This second church was described as by Samuel Lewis in 1837 “a large and handsome building”. The third and final church was erected in 1905. There were two fairs held in the village (in April and October) from at least 1825.

In his Topographical Dictionary of Ireland (1837), Samuel Lewis recorded Murroe as a village of 41 dwellings and 256 inhabitants, with a constabulary police station, fairs on 29 April and 27 October, a Roman Catholic chapel and a dispensary. His entry for the parish of Abington gives the date of the chapel at Murroe as 1811, enlarged in 1836.

The present Church of the Holy Rosary is a Romanesque-style church designed by Joseph P. O'Malley, a Limerick architect who was born in Murroe. Its foundation stone was laid on 16 October 1904 by Archbishop Thomas Fennelly of Cashel and Emly, it was dedicated in October 1906 and consecrated in 1914. The site was given by Sir Charles Barrington of Glenstal, and James Watson & Co. of Youghal supplied 21 of its stained-glass windows between 1910 and 1922.

The village expanded in the late 1820s with the arrival of the Anglican Rev. Thomas P. Le Fanu (father of Sheridan Le Fanu) to the neighbouring parish of Abington and Sir Matthew Barrington (1788–1861), 2nd Barrington baronets of Limerick to Glenstal Castle. In 1828, Le Fanu and Matthew Barrington established a dispensary on the main street. In 1926, Glenstal Castle became Glenstal Abbey monastery and boarding school.

Thomas Le Fanu was rector of Abington from 1823 (initially in absentia) and moved there with his family in 1826 when he was appointed Dean of Emly. His son Sheridan spent part of his youth in the parish, which he later used as a setting for several of his stories.

Glenstal Castle was built for Sir Matthew Barrington to designs by the English architect William Bardwell in the Norman Revival style; construction began in the 1830s and the building was not completed until the later 19th century. The Barringtons left Ireland in 1925 and the castle and demesne were bought by a priest, Monsignor James Ryan, who offered it to the Benedictines. Monks from Maredsous Abbey in Belgium arrived in 1927 and the new community was canonically erected on 18 December 1927. The monks opened a secondary school in 1932, and Glenstal was raised to the status of an abbey in 1957.

In June 1843 a repeal "monster meeting" associated with Daniel O'Connell was held at Lisavoora Hill near Murroe. The press of the day reported an attendance of 100,000, while local sources put the crowd at over 200,000.

The effects of the Great Famine on the parish were studied by the local historian Mark Tierney, who also wrote a history of the parish, Murroe and Boher: The History of an Irish Country Parish (1966).

Murroe once had eight primary schools in the area. Each of the schools, called Murroe, Clonkeen, Eyon, and Kiskiquirk, were split into a boys' and girls' school.

John Canon Hayes, founder of Muintir na Tíre, was born in Murroe in 1882. He was a priest of the Archdiocese of Cashel and Emly, ordained at the Irish College, Paris in 1913 and died at Bansha, County Tipperary, where he was the parish priest, in 1957.

Hayes was born on 11 November 1887 in a Land League hut, after his family's eviction from their farm at Moher. The first Muintir na Tíre hall in Ireland was opened in Murroe in July 1941, on the grounds of the former village church.

=== Landmarks ===
The village contains the Murroe Memorial Cross, a War of Independence memorial in the form of a decorated modern Celtic high cross. It was erected in May 1923 to commemorate the men of the east Limerick and Mid Limerick brigades of the Irish Republican Army who lost their lives in the Irish War of Independence. It is believed to be one of the first such large-scale memorials erected in the State after the war.

The cross stands at the crossroads in the centre of the village and was unveiled on 27 May 1923 by Archbishop John Harty of Cashel and Emly. It was carved by William Gaffney, the stonemason responsible for the Irish cross at Lourdes. The inscription commemorates Brigadier Seán Wall, Adjutant Patrick Ryan and Lieutenant John Frahill, together with other members of the East Limerick and Mid Limerick brigades who died in 1920 and 1921.

Clonkeen Church was founded as a monastery c. AD 600, is located approximately 4.4 km (2.7 mi) west of the village

The monastery at Clonkeen is attributed to Saint Mo-Diomog in the 6th or 7th century. The surviving church dates to the mid-12th century, was in ruins by 1657 and is a National Monument in the care of the Office of Public Works; the grounds are still used as a burial ground.

Murroe is also situated near an older monastic settlement of Abbey Owney and is home to a number of historical houses and buildings, such as Brittas Castle and Thomond Scout centre.

Abbey Owney (Abington) was a Cistercian house founded in about 1205 by Theobald Walter, Butler of Ireland, who was buried there in 1206. Little of the abbey survives, though traces can be seen beside Abington graveyard on the banks of the Mulkear.

In 1992 a Neolithic cave burial containing human remains and a decorated pottery bowl of about 3500 BC was discovered at Annagh near Murroe and excavated by Raghnall Ó Floinn of the National Museum of Ireland. The bowl is displayed in the National Museum on Kildare Street, Dublin, and was included in A History of Ireland in 100 Objects.

A Mass rock dating from the Penal era survives at Cappercullen glen, on the grounds of Glenstal Abbey.

== Demographics ==
At the 2022 census, Murroe had a population of 1,432, up from 1,377 at the 2016 census. In 2022 it had the youngest population of any village in County Limerick with at least 500 residents, with an average age of 32.5 years, compared with a national average of 38.8 years.

== Education ==
Primary education is provided by Scoil Mhuire (Murroe National School), a mixed Catholic primary school in the village.

Glenstal Abbey School, a fee-paying Benedictine secondary school for boys, is attached to Glenstal Abbey near the village; the school opened in 1932. In October 2026 the school announced that it would close, citing a decline in demand for boarding education and the wider costs of running a private school. Students will continue at the school until June 2027, and current second- and fifth-year students will complete their Junior and Senior Cycles in 2027–28.

== Transport ==
Bus Éireann route 332 serves Murroe, linking it with Limerick city, Newport and Cappamore.

== Notable people ==
- John Canon Hayes (1887–1957), priest and founder of Muintir na Tíre, was born in Murroe.
- Jimmy Humphreys (1894–1956), hurler who won two All-Ireland medals with Limerick, was born and died in Murroe.
- Joseph P. O'Malley (1867–1933), architect of the Church of the Holy Rosary, was born in Murroe.
- Sheridan Le Fanu (1814–1873), writer, lived in the neighbouring parish of Abington from 1826.

== Amenities ==
The Slieve Felim Way, a 43 kilometres (27 miles) long-distance trail through the Slieve Felim and Silvermine Mountains, has a trail-head in the village. It is designated as a National Waymarked Trail by the National Trails Office of the Irish Sports Council and is managed by Shannon Development and Coillte.

The gardens and lands of Glenstal monastery are accessible to the public.

The Clare Glens wooded area along the banks of the Clare River is located on the edge of the townland towards Newport.

Sporting and cultural organisations in Murroe include Murroe Boher Amateur Dramatic Society, the Marion Active Retirement Club, Mulcair Men's Shed, Glenstal walkers, Murroe AFC (situated in Tubber), Murroe/Boher GAA, and Murroe-Boher Scouts.

The Murroe club was represented at the first Limerick county board meeting in January 1887 and won the first Limerick county hurling championship that year. The Murroe and Boher clubs amalgamated in 1998 as Murroe-Boher.

== Gallery ==
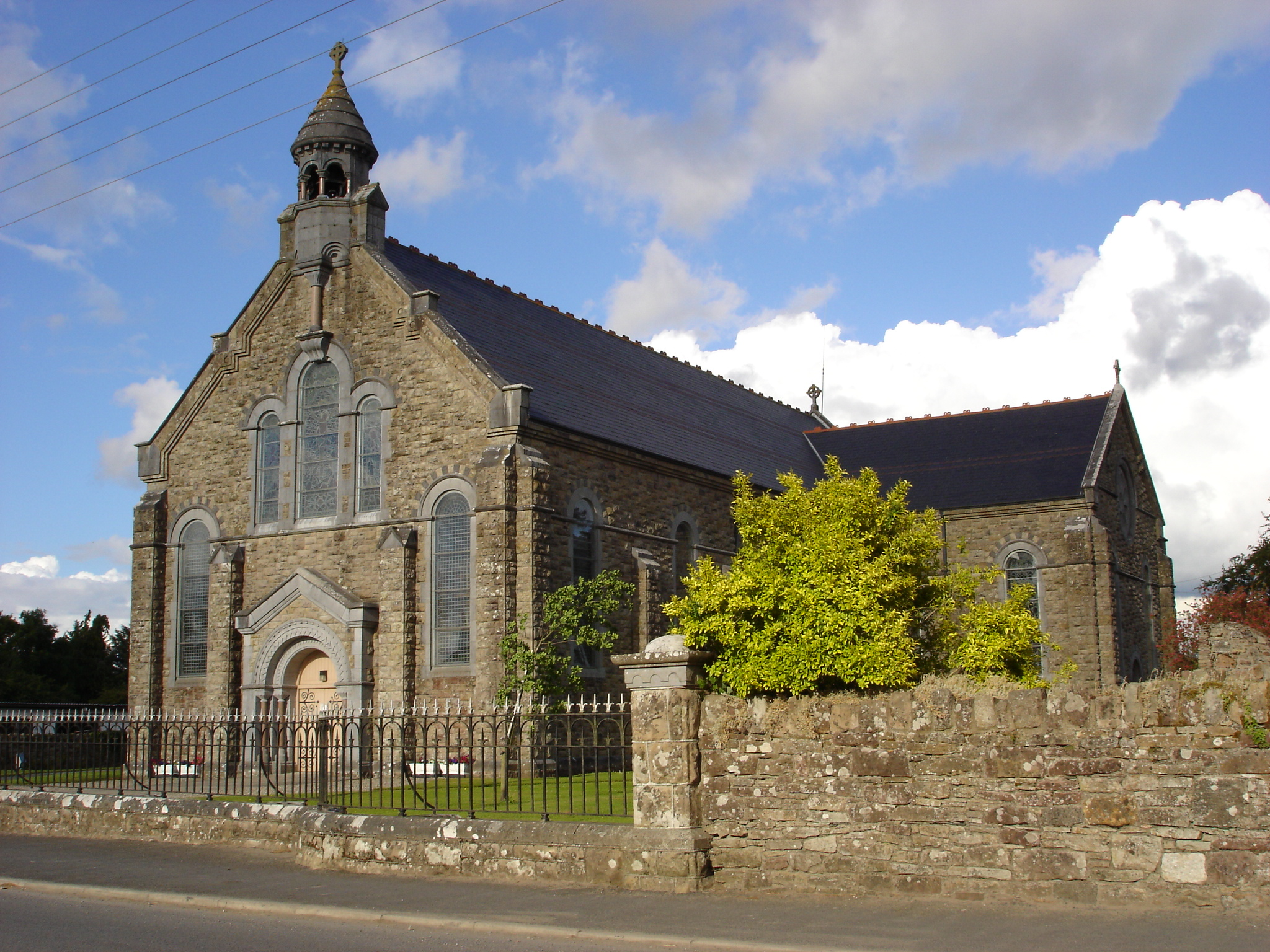
Church of the Holy Rosary

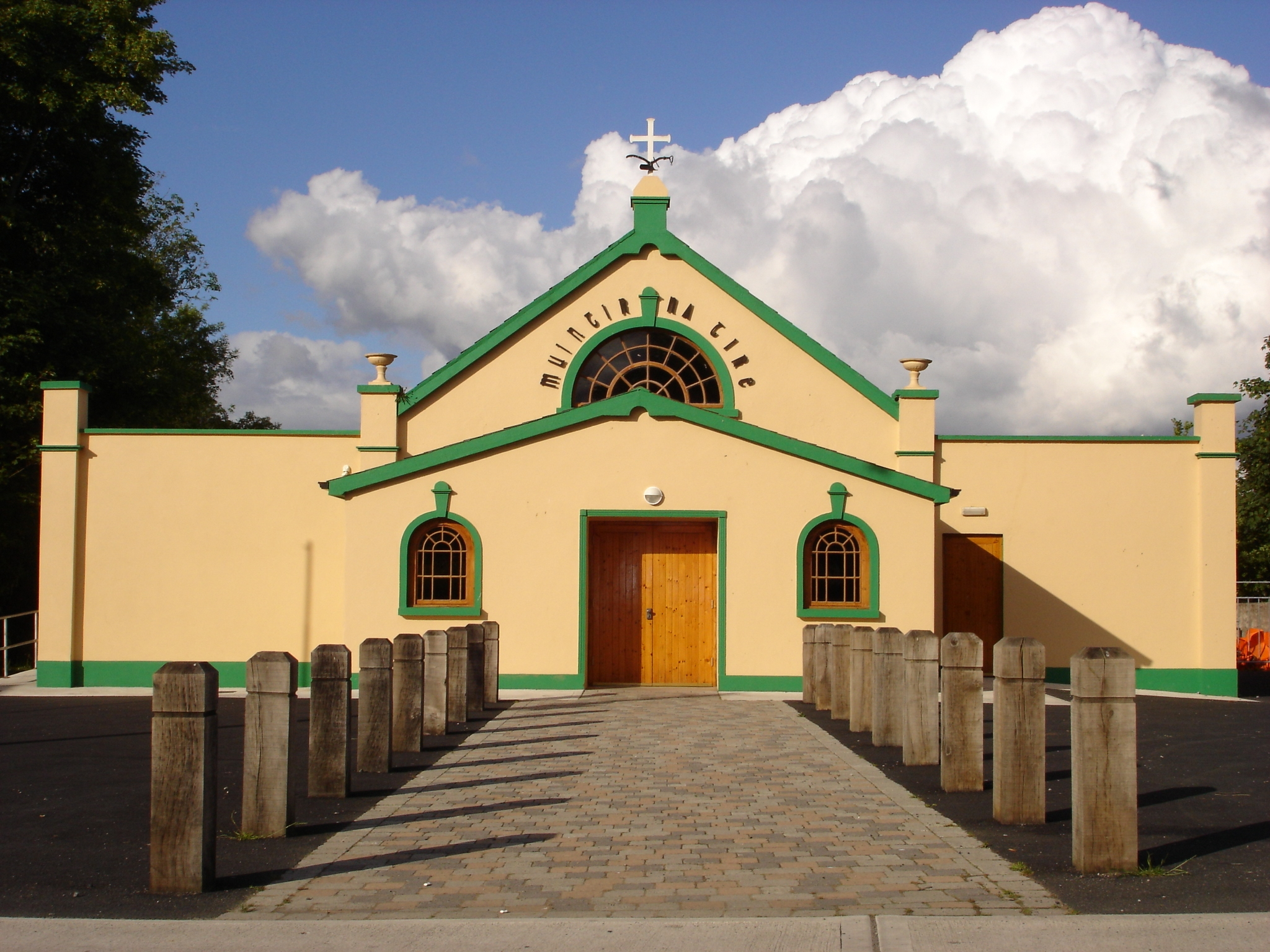
Muintir na Tíre

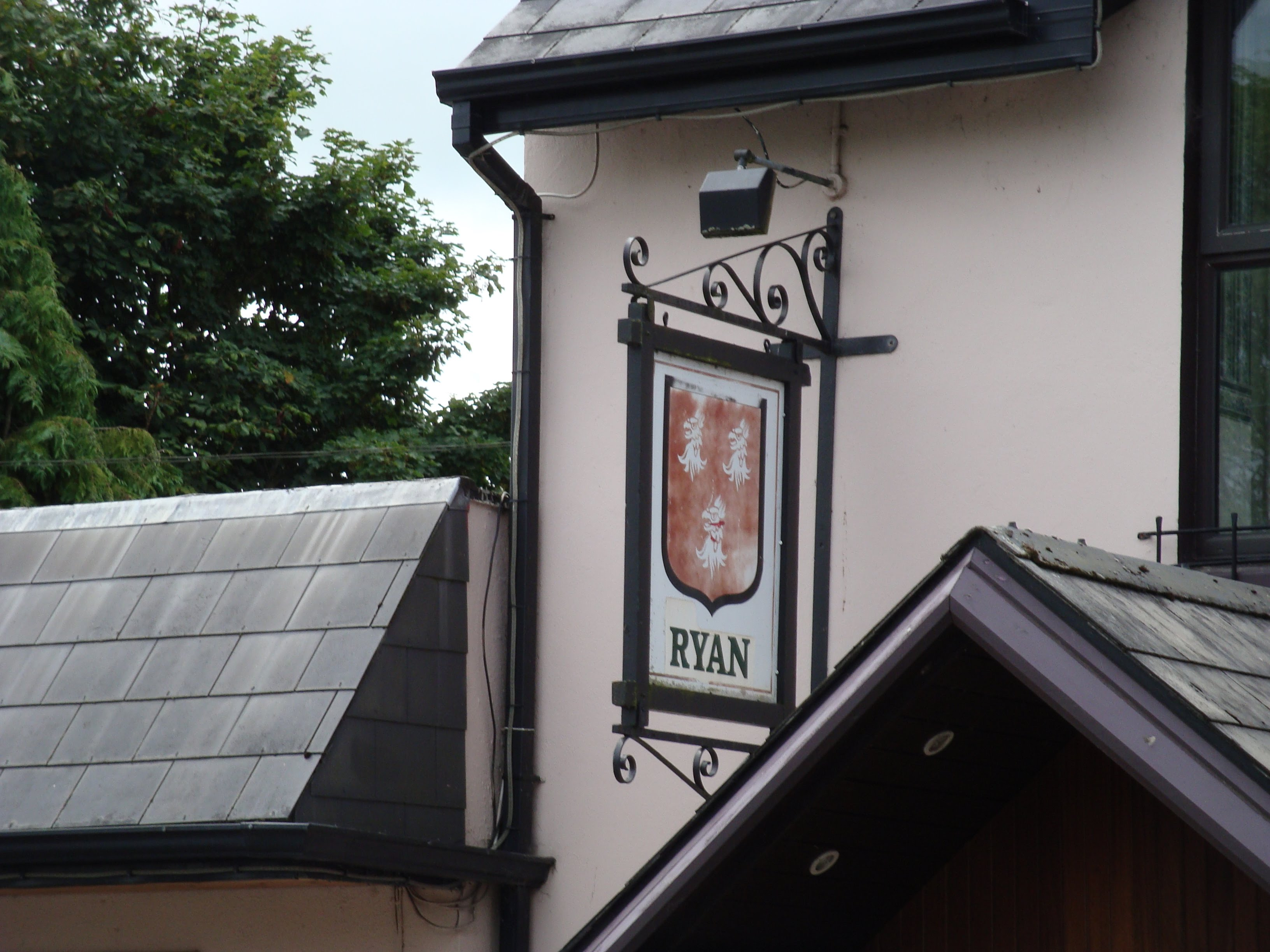
Ryan coat of arms at Valley Inn pub

== See also ==
- List of towns and villages in Ireland
