= Clare Glens =

Wooded area in County Tipperary, Ireland

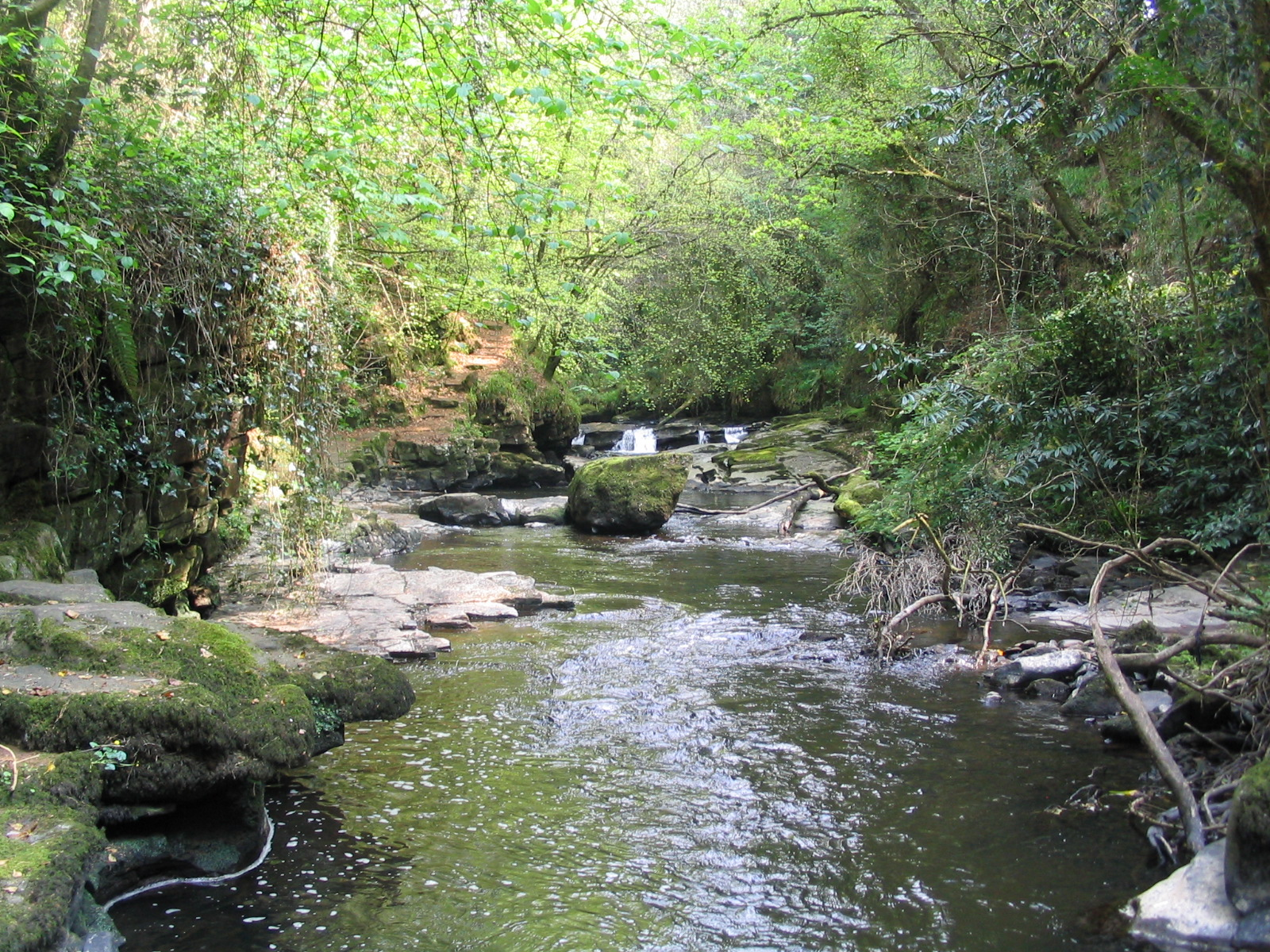

The Clare Glens is a wooded area with a path up the red sandstone gorge separated by the banks of the Clare River, which separates counties Tipperary and Limerick in Ireland. It is located about 4 km from Newport, County Tipperary and about 5 km from Murroe, County Limerick, on the R506 road.

There are two carparks located near to the entrance for walkers. There is also a small children's play area, picnic area and toilet facilities at the smaller carpark.

There is a signposted trail consisting of a walkway on both banks of the river with views and swimming locations. This includes an opening below a waterfall known as The Big Eas.

The river is used as a kayaking venue, where canoeists usually enter the Clare River at the top car park by the city of Ashroe and kayak down the waterfalls and rapids.

In the late 1990s the Limerick path of the Clare Glens was widened and levelled to allow emergency vehicles access to the two mile long walk.

The Clare Glens were hit during Storm Darwin on 12 February 2014, and suffered severe damage.

The site is a listed European Special Area of Conservation (SAC), designated for its areas of oak woodland habitat and a species of rare fern known as the Killarney Fern Trichomanes speciosum.
