= Abbey of Woney =

- Mainistir Uaithne
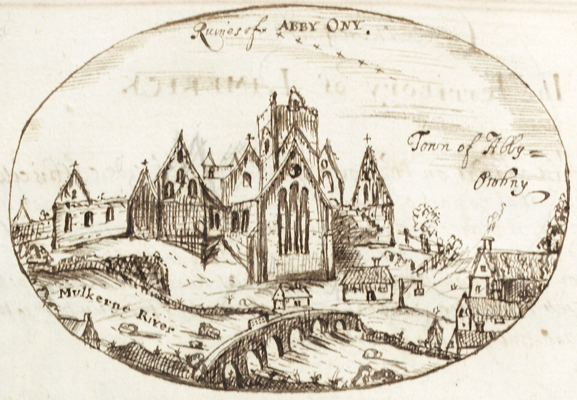
- Thomas Dineley drawing of Abbey Ony (1681)

- Location within Ireland

Monastery information
- Other names: Abbey of Wotheny; Abbey of Owney
- Order: Cistercians
- Established: 1205
- Disestablished: 1563
- Mother house: Congregation of Savigny
- Diocese: Cashel and Emly

People
- Founder: Theobald Walter, 1st Chief Butler of Ireland

Architecture
- Status: Inactive
- Style: Cistercian

Site
- Location: Abington, Murroe, County Limerick, Ireland
- Coordinates: 52.6331217°N 8.4219608°W
- Public access: No

The Cistercian Abbey of Woney (Irish, Mainistir Uaithne), also written Wotheny or Owney, on the banks of the Mulkear River in Abington, County Limerick, was founded in 1205.

The monastery was founded for a group of monks who were brought to Ireland from Lancashire in England.

At that time Theobald Walter (le Botiller), brother of Hubert Walter (Archbishop of Canterbury), granted the whole "theodum" (believed to be an error, which should have been feodum) of Woodenikuwice for the purpose. Traces of the architecture and layout of the monastery may still seen in the graveyard in the hamlet of Abington, just south of Murroe.

In the early fourteenth century the possessions of the abbey included the lands of Athnid parish in County Tipperary.

Around 1563, the abbey and all its possessions were granted by Elizabeth I to a Captain Walshe who erected a new house near the old buildings. In 1609, part of the lands which formerly belonged to the abbey were conveyed by Sir E. Walsh to Sir Richard Boyle. In the war of 1641 the estates granted to the Walshe family were forfeited to the Crown.

The deed is held at the National Museum of Ireland.

== Charter ==
The Charter, dated 1205, runs thus: Omnibus...Theobaldus Walteri, pineerna Hiberniae, salutem. Sciatis me pro amore Dei...didisse et concessisse, et hae praesenti carta mea confirmasse in puram et perpetuam eleemosynam Deo, et beatae Mariae, et abbati et monachis de Wodency, in cantredo de Wodeney O’Cathelan, et Wodency O’Flian, totum thend, sive fundum de Wodency Fidenwide, in quo villa de Clonfene sita est, cum medietate aqure de Molkerne, in quantum praedictum twede se extendit super praedictam aquam de Molkerne, cum omnibus pertinentiis suis, rationabiliter divisis; seil per has divsas; ex aquilonali parte per aquam de Clodach, ubi cadit in En-Olkerne; sie ascendendo usque ad Ballinagarfh, et Villengarfh, cum pertinentiis suis; et a Villenagarfh per camdem aquam sic ascendendo usque ad montana, et sicut aqua de Clodach circuit montana; et sie per exteriores partes montanas, versus orientem descendendo usque ad lacum de Grey; et sic per aquam de Molkerne, quae exit de lacu praedicto, descendendo usque ad abbatiam. Et praeterea feodum unius militis quod dicitur Dromenalewy, tam in bosco quam in plano, de term quae proxima est aquae de Molkerne ex australi parte, contravillam de Clonkeene, et terram quae est ex aquilonali parte de Molkerae, quae vicatur Balligabeg, in quantum praefatum feodum se extendat super praefatam aquam de Molkerne, cum tota medietate ejusdem aquae, et cum omnibus pertinentiis suis, usque ad Buckrum, inter Karkenlis et Dromenaleyw, et alias divisas suas rationabiles. Et unum burgath in Limerico, cum omnibus pertineatiis suis. Quare volo et firmiter praecipio, quod praefati abbas et monachi habeant et teneant omnia praenominata, cum omnibus pertinentiis suis, libere et quiete, bene et honorifice, pacifice, integre et plenarie, in bosco et in plano, in viis et semitis, in pratis, pascuis et pasturis, in aquis et molendinis, in stagnis et vivariis, in maris et mariseis, in piseationibus et piseariis,...turbariis, in vivariis et leporiis, in occlesiis et capellis, et in omnibus aliis libertatibus et liberis consuetudinibus, et omnibus aisiamentis quae in praedictis terris sunt et esse possunt. Concessi etiam eisdem abbati et monachis eandem liberatem quam et magister domus ipsorum, seil. Saveine, habere dignoseitur; se. sach et soch, et tholf et them, et infangthef, et outfangther, et duedum, et fureas et follas, et judicium ferri et aquae. Insuper...ut ipsi et homines sui sint quieti a tolneto, pontagio, stallagio et pannagio per totam terram meam. Et volo ut sint quieti ab omnibus causis et querelis, et placitis ballivorum et praepositorum hundredi; et a pultura serjanorum, et de rewardo forestariorum, et forestae; et de omnibus aliis causis, et querelis et placitis ad me et haerdes pertineutibus. Et volo, ut habeant et teneant omnes rationabiles donationes tenentium meorum, dquas cis conferre volucrint in eleemosynam &e.

Translated from Latin into English as follows: Theobald Fitzwalter, chief butler of Ireland, to all persons...greetings. Know that I for the love of God...have given and granted, and by this my present written instrument have confirmed in absolute and perpetual gift to God, and to blessed Mary, and to the abbot and monks of Uaithne, in the cantrel of Uaithne O’Cahalan, and of Uaithne O’Cliaeh, the entire tract or estate of Fidhenmhaide (wood of the stare—Mhaidbuie?) in which the manor of Clonkeen is situated, with half the stream of the Mulkear, as far as the aforesaid estate borders on the said Mulkear river, with all its appurtenances defined in a reasonable manner; namely by the following limits; on the north side (of the Mulkear) by the river Clodach, where it falls into the river Mulkear, ascending to Ballyvara and Killinagariff, with all its appurtenances; and from Killenagrariff along the same river up as far as the Hill country, and following the Clodach’s course around the mountains; and then along the outskirts of the mountains towards the east, descending to lake Grean; and thence along the river Mulkear, which issues from said lake, descending as far as the abbey. And besides, one Knight’s fief which is called Dromelia, in wood and in plain, of the land nearest the river Mulkear on the south side, over against the manor of Clonkeen, and the land north of the Mulkear, which is called Ballyguy, as far as the aforesaid fief borders on the said river Mulkear, with the entire half of same river, and with all its appurtenances, as far as Boher between Caherionlis and Dromelia, and its other reasonable allotments. And one town-lot in (the city of) Limerick to be held by burgage, with all its appurtenances.

Wherefore I wish and strictly enjoin, that the aforesaid abbot and monks do have and hold all the aforenamed, with all things pertaining to them, freely and undisturbedly, will and honourably, peacefully, entirely and fully, in wood and plain, in high-ways and bye-ways, in meadows, fields and pastures, in rivers and mills, in lakes and fish-ponds, in fens and marshes, in fisheries and fishing-grounds, ...in turbaries, in parks and warrens, in churches and oratories, and in all other immunities and free usages, and in all privileges, that are and may be in the aforesaid lands.

I have likewise granted to the same abbot and monks the same liberty which the head of their house, namely Savigny, is known to possess; that is, the jurisdiction of sae and soe (the right of holding trials and imposing fines within the manor) and tol (exemption from custom for commodities and for all things bought and sold) and them (right to the offspring of the villeins wherever born, ib) and infangthef (power to judge any robber taken within their fee), and outfangthef (the right to try robbers of their territory captured outside their fee, Chartul.) and the right to hold trial by combat, and to erect gallows and pillories, and to hold trial by fire (red-hot iron) and (boiling water). Moreover...that they and their men be exempt from custom, bridge-toll, rent for stalls in markets &e., and from rent for mast throughout my whole territory. And I wish them to be exempt from all suits and actions, and ordinances of bailiffs and overseers of districts; and from the legal exactions of sergeants, and from remuneration of forest-keepers and forest-dues; and from all other suits, and actions & ordinances pertaining to me and my heirs. And I wish, that they have and hold all reasonable donations of my tenants, which these shall be pleased to bestow on them by way of alm, &e.

Among the witnesses to the "Foundation Chart," dated 1205, are W. de Burgo and G. de Kentowell .

The boundaries of the abbey lands here given can all be clearly traced at present; they are identical with those of Abington (Murroe and Boher) parish in modern times; only regarding the ancient site of "lake Grey" is there any uncertainty. The lake must have been fed by the Bilboa river and the streams to the east that now unite to form the Mulkear. The lake evidently took its name from the hill & parish of Grean to the south of it.

== Burials ==
- Theobald Walter, 1st Chief Butler of Ireland
