= R505 road =

R505 road may refer to:

- R505 road (Ireland)
- R505 road (South Africa)
