= Boherlahan =

Village in County Tipperary, Ireland

Boherlahan An Bóthar Leathan
- Village
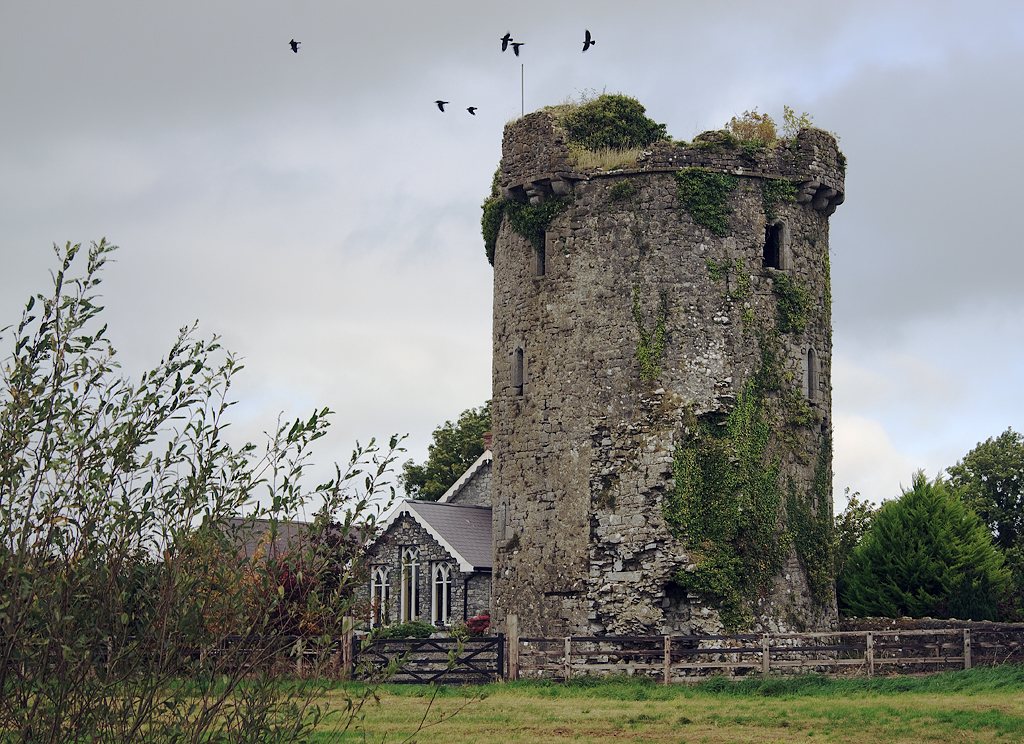
- Synone Castle lies approximately 1.5km to the east of Boherlahan

- Location within Ireland
- Coordinates: 52.5722°N 7.8937°W
- Country: Ireland
- Province: Munster
- County: Tipperary

Population (2022)
  - Total: 171
- Irish grid reference: S072467

Boherlahan (Irish: An Bóthar Leathan) is a small village and census town in County Tipperary, Ireland. It is 6 km north of Cashel, on the R660 road which runs between Cashel and Thurles. Boherlahan was designated as a census town by the Central Statistics Office for the first time in the 2016 census, at which time it had a population of 299 people.

== History ==
Evidence of ancient settlement in the area includes a number of ring fort, holy well, bawn and tower house (castle) sites in the surrounding townlands of Nodstown, Ardmayle East and Synone.

Charles Bianconi (1786–1875), entrepreneur and developer of coach services in Ireland, lived at Longfield House near Boherlahan, and commissioned an Italianate-style memorial chapel in the village cemetery. The local Roman Catholic church, alongside the cemetery, was built in 1964 on the site of an earlier 19th century church.

== Amenities ==
The national (primary) school in the village, Saint Isidore's National School, had an enrollment of approximately 100 pupils as of 2017.

The local Gaelic Athletic Association club is Boherlahan–Dualla GAA.
