= Noel Mooney =

Irish footballer (born 1976)

Personal information
- Date of birth: 12 December 1976 (age 49)
- Place of birth: London, England
- Position: Goalkeeper

Youth career
- Cappamore Celtic F.C.
- St. Michael's A.F.C.

Senior career*
Years	Team	Apps	(Gls)
1994–1996	Limerick		(0)
1996–2003	Cork City	103	(0)
2004–2005	Shamrock Rovers	29	(0)
2005–2006	Limerick	18	(0)
- * Club domestic league appearances and goals

Noel Mooney (born 12 December 1976) is an Irish sports official and former footballer who is the CEO of the Football Association of Wales.

== Early life ==
Born on 12 December 1976, Noel Mooney grew up in Cappamore, a town in County Limerick. He played as a goalkeeper at underage level for his local team, Cappamore Celtic. Mooney moved to St. Michael's and played for them in the FAI Youth Cup in the early 1990s.

== Career ==
Mooney began his career as a semi-professional footballer at Limerick F.C. He quit football after a disagreement with the club and worked on construction sites in England before moving back to Ireland with Cork City in 1996. During his time at Turners Cross, he helped City win the FAI Cup in 1998, defeating Shelbourne F.C. after a replay. Mooney also kept 2 clean sheets in seven European appearances.

He went on to play with Shamrock Rovers, and was instrumental in keeping the Dubliners in the Premier Division in the 2004 season. Limerick F.C. announced the signing of Mooney as their goalkeeper in 2005. In June 2006, Mooney was appointed as Limerick F.C.'s commercial director. He retired from playing football at the end of the 2006 season due to injury. The same year, he joined the Football Association of Ireland (FAI) as their club promotions officer, later becoming the organisation's lead marketing manager.

After five years in the FAI's marketing team, Mooney moved to the Union of European Football Associations (UEFA) in 2011. He returned to the FAI in 2019, after he was seconded to the organisation following the fallout over a bridging loan provided by former chief executive, John Delaney. He led the association for six months before returning to his role with UEFA. During his time in charge of the FAI's administration, Mooney stated his aim was to restore the state funding that had been suspended as a result of the bridging loan, revealed discussions about plans for equal pay between male players and their female counterparts and attempted to mend the organisation's relationship with former international manager Brian Kerr. However, his secondment ended without the delivery of these goals and with Sport Ireland referring an audit on the FAI to the gardaí. In addition, despite attempts to distance himself from the previous regime, Mooney received criticism for his previous remarks that indicated his approval of the organisation under John Delaney.

After returning to UEFA, Mooney became their Head of Strategic Development and worked on the strategies, commercial revenues, digital transformations and governance for all 55 European federations.

Mooney worked for the Football Association of Ireland, UEFA, and the Football Association of Wales.

On 19 July 2021, Mooney was appointed chief executive officer (CEO) of the Football Association of Wales. He began his role in September 2021, after moving from Geneva to live in Cardiff. In January 2026, his contract was extended until 2030.

== Personal life ==
During his career as a footballer, Mooney worked in construction and automobile sales. He completed a postgraduate degree in marketing studies in Dublin Institute of Technology (DIT) while working with the FAI.

In 2001, Mooney was involved in a car accident in which a young woman died. He was convicted of careless driving and fined €400.

He is married to a woman named Kertu with whom he shares a son, Sean Mooney. His family live in the Pontcanna area of Cardiff.

== Honours ==
Cork City

- FAI Cup
  - 1997–98
- League of Ireland Cup
  - 1998–99

Limerick

- Munster Senior Cup
  - 1995–96

== Sources ==
- Irish Football Handbook by Dave Galvin & Gerry Desmond (ISBN 0-9517987-3-1)
