= R659 road (Ireland) =

Road in Ireland

Coordinates: 52.659892°N 7.849988°W

R659 road
- Bóthar R659

Route information
- Length: 6.5 km (4.0 mi)

Major junctions
- From: N62 Thurles
- Crosses Dublin–Cork railway line
- To: R660 Holycross

Location
- Country: Ireland

Highway system
- Roads in Ireland; Motorways; Primary; Secondary; Regional

The R659 road is a regional road in Ireland, located in County Tipperary.
