= Abington (townland) =

Townland in County Limerick, Ireland

- Townland
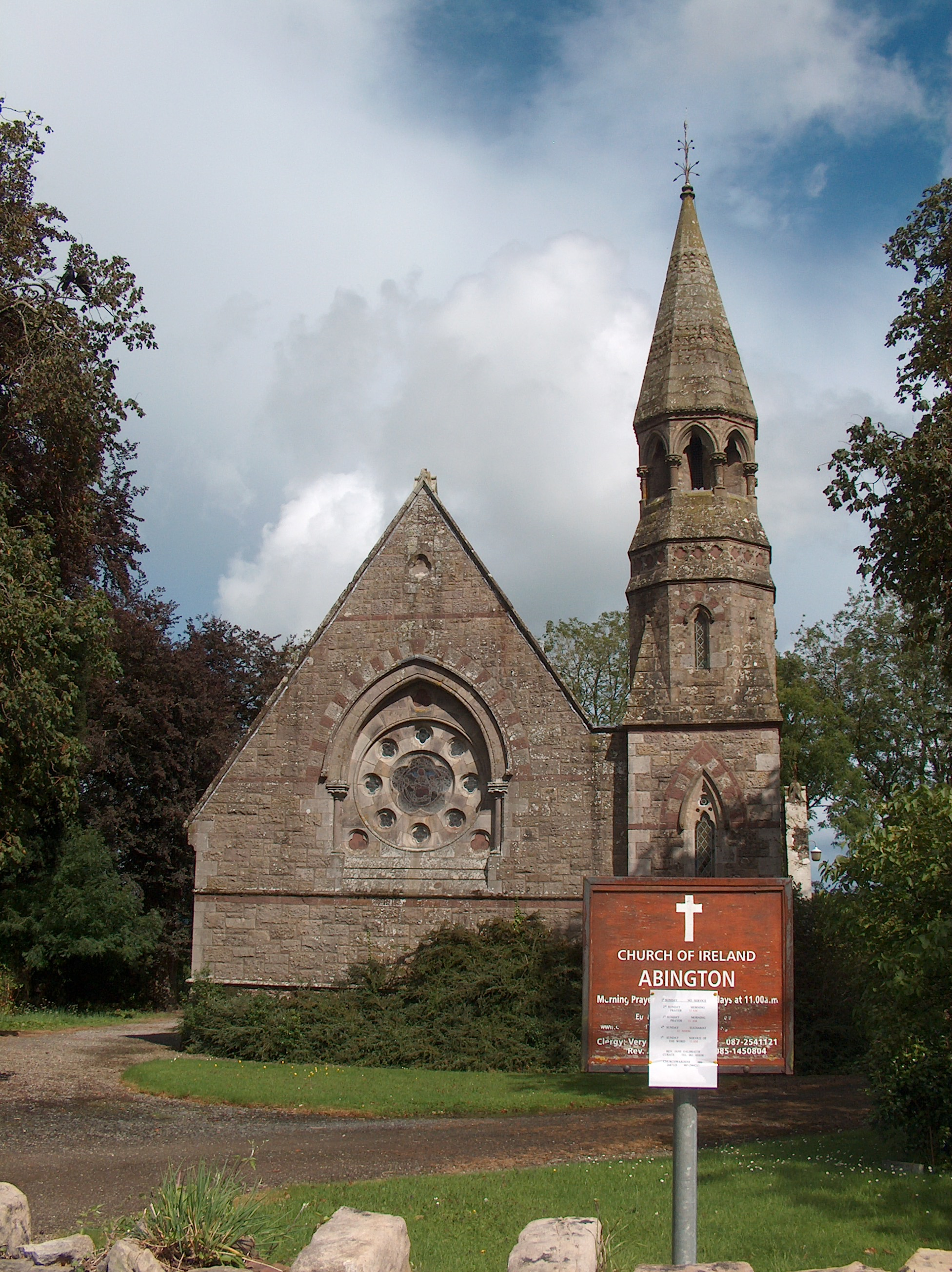
- Abington's Church of Ireland church

- Location in Ireland
- Coordinates: 52.6331°N 8.4219°W
- Country: Ireland
- Province: Munster
- County: County Limerick

Population (2011)
  - Rural: 139

Abington (Irish: Mainistir Uaithne) is a townland in the civil parish of Abington in County Limerick, Ireland. The ruins of the mediaeval Abbey of Woney are located in the local graveyard. The local Church of Ireland church, Saint John's church, designed by James Rawson Carroll and built in 1869, is in the Diocese of Limerick and Killaloe.

As of the 2011 census, Abington townland had a population of 139 people.
