= R661 road (Ireland) =

Regional road in Ireland

R661 road
- Bóthar R661
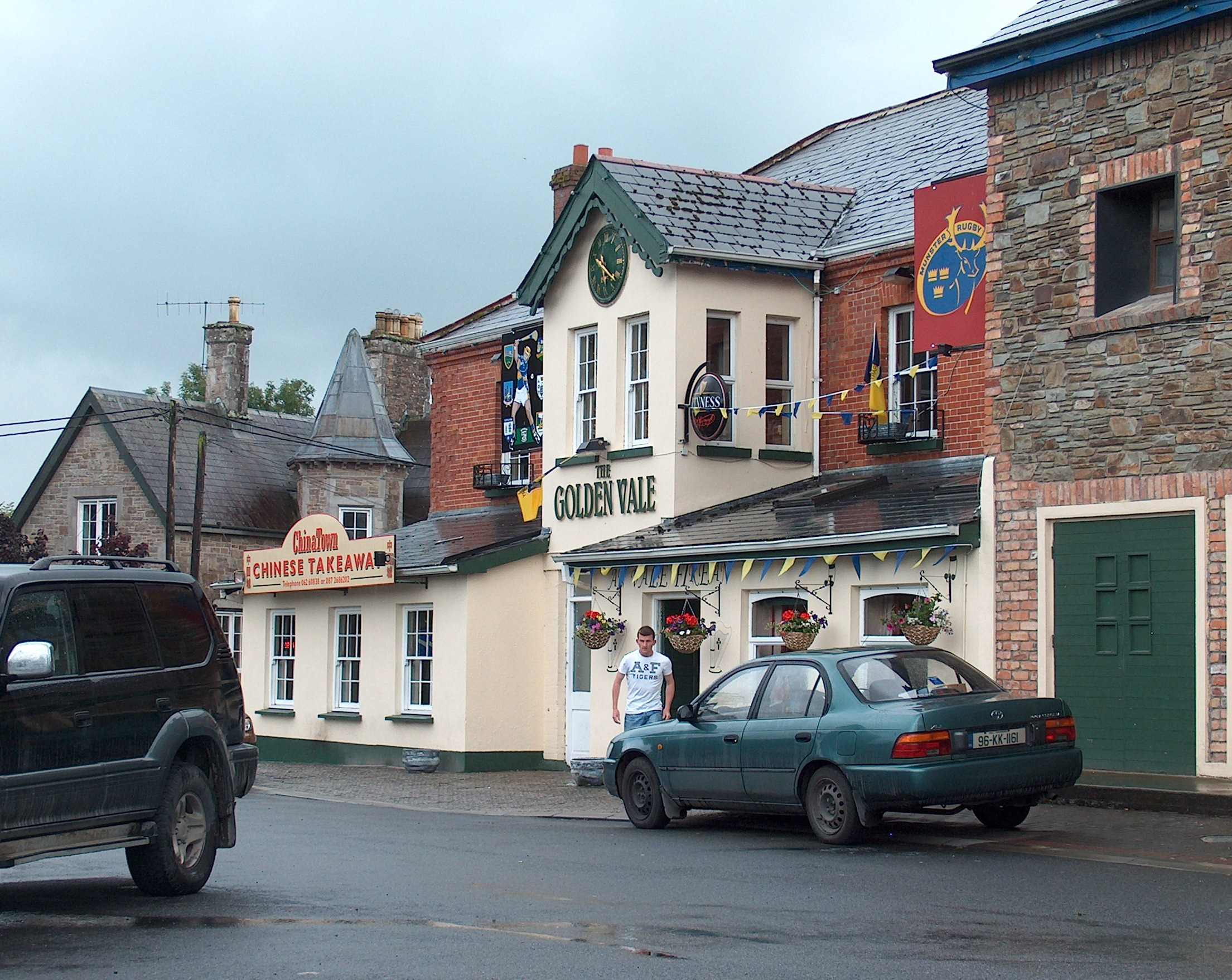
- Dundrum on the R661

Route information
- Length: 30.3 km (18.8 mi)

Major junctions
- From: R660 at Holycross, County Tipperary

- R505 at Dundrum

- To: R497 at Tipperary, County Tipperary

Location
- Country: Ireland

Highway system
- Roads in Ireland; Motorways; Primary; Secondary; Regional
← R660	→ R662

The R661 road is a regional road in County Tipperary, Ireland. It travels from the R660 road in Holycross to the R497 in Tipperary town, via Clonoulty and Dundrum. The road is 30.3 kilometres (18.8 mi) long.
