= Dromsally =

Townland in County Limerick, Ireland

Dromsally (Irish: Drom Saileach, meaning 'hill of the sally (willow) trees ') is a townland in the parish of Cappamore, County Limerick, Ireland. It extends from the border with the parish of Murroe to the west and into the village of Cappamore to the east.

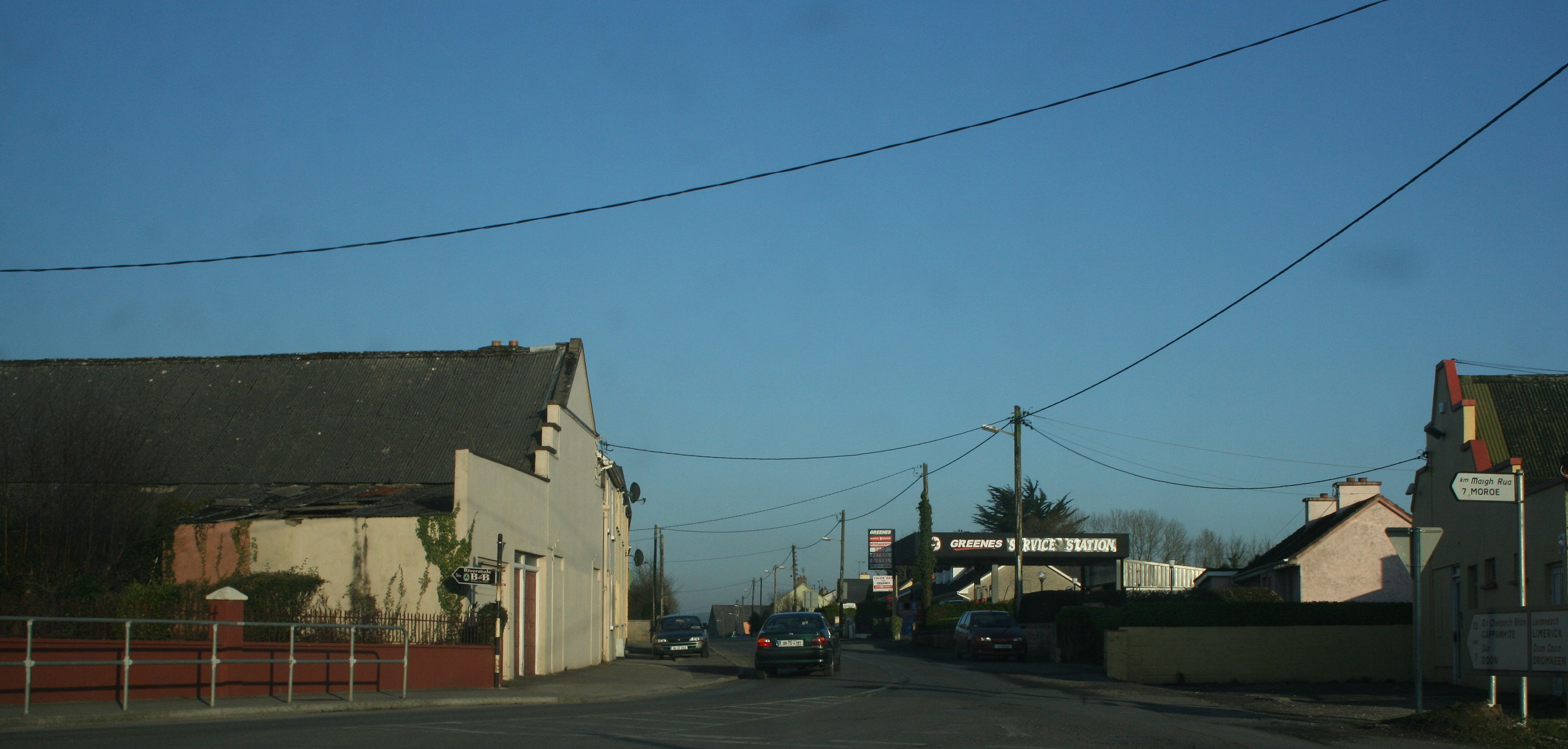
Dromsally at entrance to Cappamore village

== History ==
During the 1847 Great Famine, a fever hospital was established in Dromsally. The hospital operated for two years and treated 556 patients of which only 84 died.

== People ==
Dromsally is the birthplace and residence of one of Ireland's most capped rugby players John Hayes.
