= R506 road (Ireland) =

Road in County Limerick, Ireland

R506 road
- Bóthar R506
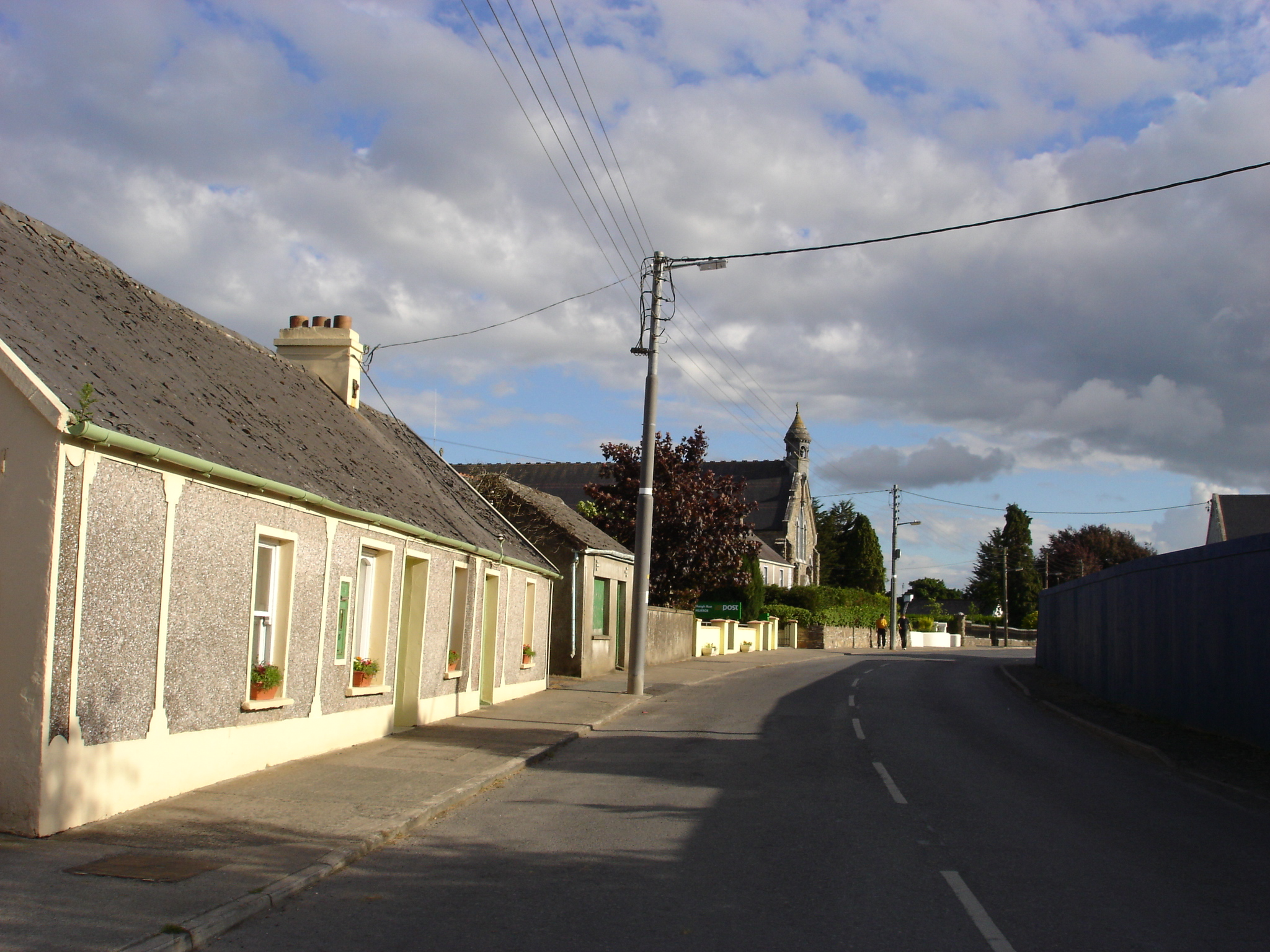
- Main Street, Murroe, on the R506

Route information
- Length: 18 km (11 mi)

Location
- Country: Ireland

Highway system
- Roads in Ireland; Motorways; Primary; Secondary; Regional

The R506 road is a regional road in the east of County Limerick, Ireland which runs west-east from its junction with the R445 regional road at Garraunykee, Annacotty and its junction with the R505 regional road in the townland of Dromsally on the outskirts of the village of Cappamore. En route it passes through the village of Murroe. The road is 18 km (11 mi) long.

== See also ==
- Roads in Ireland
- National primary road
- National secondary road
