= Murroe Memorial Cross =

Coordinates: 52°38′58″N 8°23′59″W

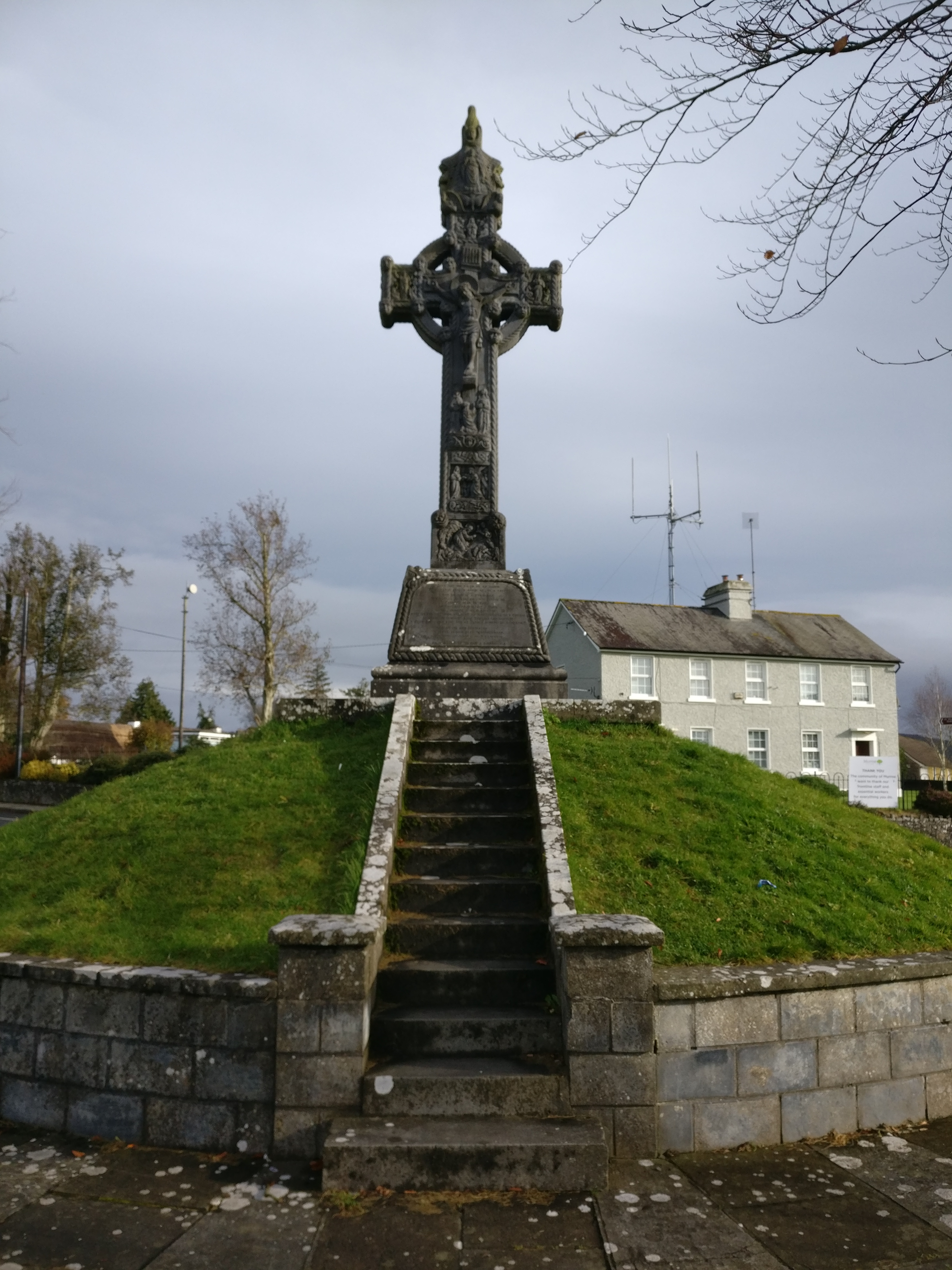
Memorial cross in Murroe

Murroe Memorial Cross, also known as the Limerick Brigades Memorial, is an Irish War of Independence memorial located in the village of Murroe in County Limerick.

== History ==
This monument was carved by William Gaffney, a stonemason from County Waterford, who also carved the Irish cross at Lourdes.

The cross was unveiled by the Archbishop of Cashel, Dr John Harty, on 27 May 1923. This makes it one of the earliest, if not possible the earliest, public memorial in Ireland to commemorate those who fought in the Irish War of Independence. It was unveiled less than two years after hostilities ceased with the Truce of 11 July 1921, and only three days after Frank Aiken ordered Anti-Treaty forces to "dump their arms", effectively bringing to and end the subsequent Irish Civil War. The commissioning, funding, installation and unveiling of the monument by locals, when set against the background of the then ongoing Civil War and the dire economic and political circumstances facing the community, makes its achievement all the more impressive.

It was built to commemorate the men of the east Limerick and Mid Limerick brigades of the Irish Republican Army (IRA) who lost their lives in the War of Independence. Thousands of people from both County Limerick and County Tipperary attended the unveiling of the monument. In his speech (at the unveiling) the Archbishop said that this monument was not only a symbol of sacrifice and brotherhood but it was also a promise of resurrection.

== Features ==
This is a freestanding monument that comprises a limestone ashlar Celtic cross on a tapered base. The base is adorned with inscribed limestone plaques and the monument has a great amount of figurative as well as Celtic strap work detailing. It stands at the crossroads in the centre of the village on a high mound. It is 250 cm in height and the width at the base is 90 cm.

The plaques at the base of the cross are inscribed with both Irish script and English text. The text on one plaque reads:

"Greater love than this no man hath

that a man lay down his life for his friend"

Erected by a grateful people to the memory of

Brigadier Sean Wall

Adjutant Patrick Ryan

Lieutenant John Frahill

Soldiers of the Irish Republican Army

East Limerick and Mid Limerick Brigades

and other noble dead who fell in

1920 and 1921 fighting English aggression

They sought not honour praise renown

They loved and died tis the martyr's crown

May the Lord have mercy of their souls.

On the opposite plaque, this same text is written in Irish or Gaelic script. The names of the other men from the Limerick brigades that died are inscribed on the remaining two plaques.
