= Athnid =

Civil parish in County Tipperary, Ireland

- Civil parish
- Location in Ireland
- Coordinates: 52°43′21″N 7°46′15″W
- Country: Ireland

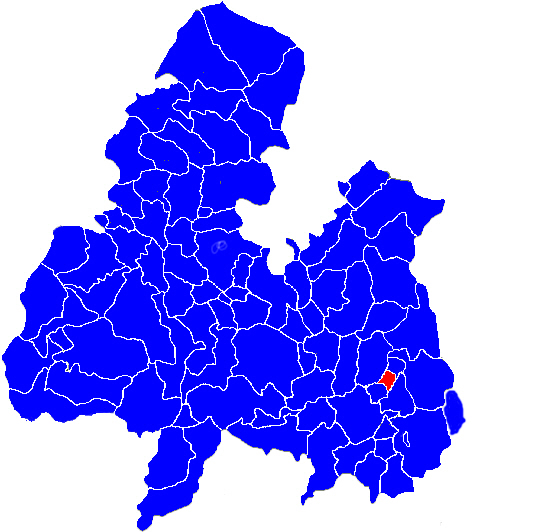
Location within north Tipperary

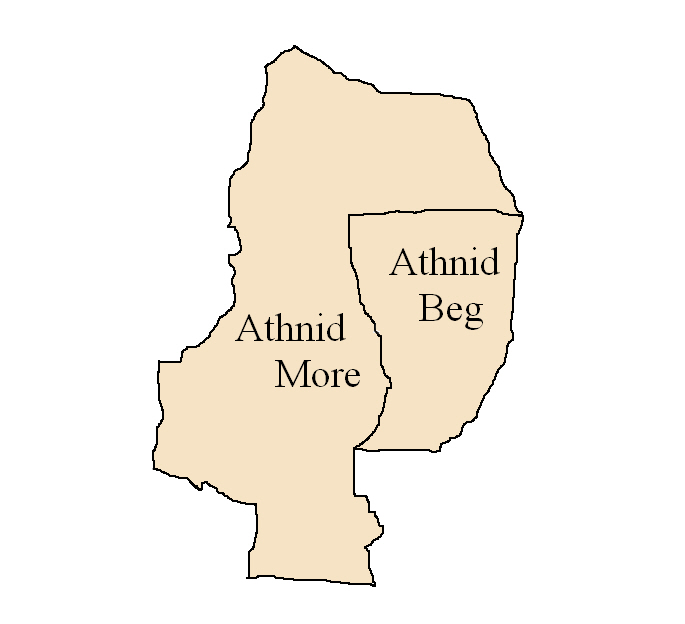
Townlands in the parish

Athnid (Irish Áth Nid, "ford of the nest"), some times written Adnith, or Athnett, is a civil parish in the barony of Eliogarty in County Tipperary. It is divided into two townlands: Athnid More (containing a little more than 638 acres)) and Athnid Beg (containing a little more than 216 acres).

Writing in 1837, Lewis said that the parish had 253 inhabitants.

== Church of Ireland parish ==
Like all civil parishes, this civil parish is derived from, and co-extensive with a pre-existing Church of Ireland parish of the same name.

The lands of Athnid parish were owned by the Cistercian Abbey of Woney in County Limerick. The lands of the parish were mentioned in rent returns for 1303.

Lewis said that the vicarage of Athnid was "partly united, by act of council, in 1682" to the living of the Church of Ireland parish of Thurles.

== See also ==
- List of civil parishes of Tipperary
