= Cappawhite =

Village in County Tipperary, Ireland

Cappawhite An Cheapach
- Village
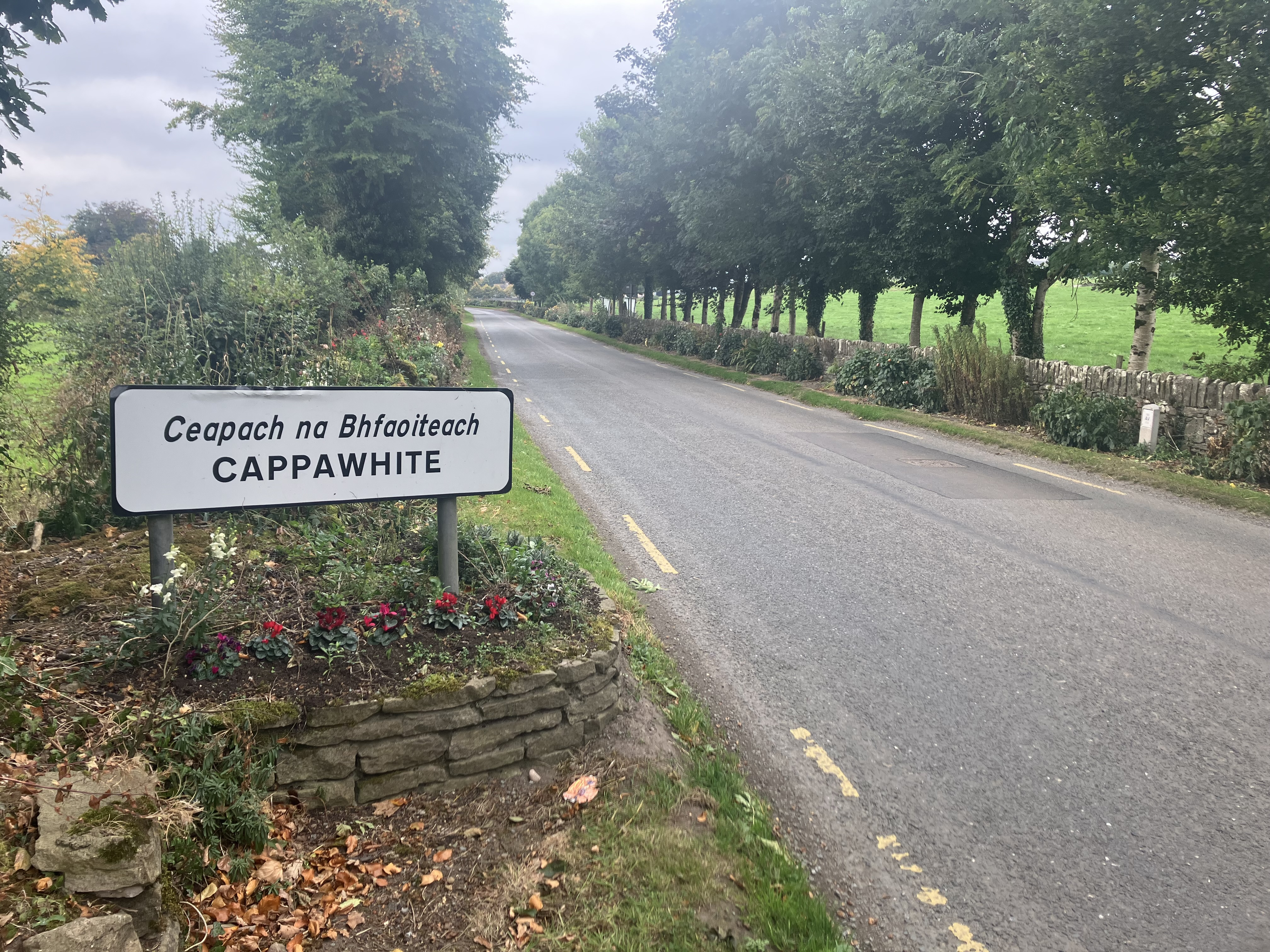

- Location in Ireland
- Coordinates: 52°34′56″N 8°09′48″W
- Country: Ireland
- Province: Munster
- County: County Tipperary
- Elevation: 137 m (449 ft)

Population (2016)
  - Total: 343
- Time zone: UTC+0 (WET)
  - Summer (DST): UTC-1 (IST (WEST))
- Irish Grid Reference: R889478

Cappawhite, also Cappaghwhite (Irish: An Cheapach or Ceapach na bhFaoiteach, meaning 'White's tillage plot'), is a village in County Tipperary, Ireland. It is on the R505 road from Cashel to County Limerick. Close major towns include Tipperary town (12 kilometres to the south) and Cashel (20 kilometres to the east).

== Sports ==
Cappawhite is home to Cappawhite GAA who were Tipperary Senior Hurling Championship winners in 1987 and Tipperary U21 Champions in 1999.
