= John M. Hayes (priest) =

Irish Catholic priest

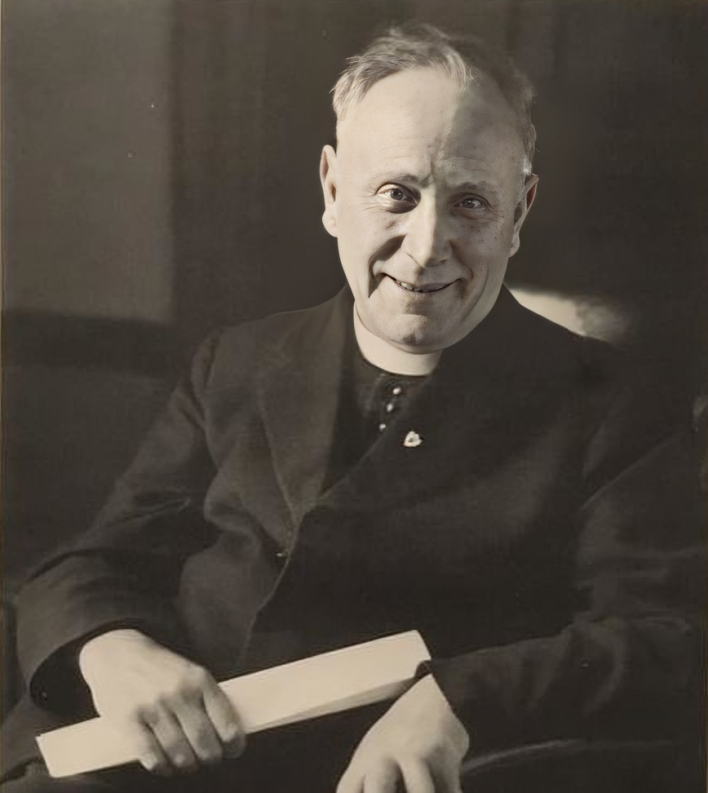

Orders
- Ordination: 1 June 1913

Personal details
- Born: 11 November 1887 Murroe, County Limerick, Ireland
- Died: 30 January 1957 (aged 69) County Tipperary, Ireland
- Occupation: Roman Catholic Priest
- Education: Crescent College, Limerick; St. Patrick's College, Thurles

John Martin Hayes (11 November 1887 – 30 January 1957) was an Irish Catholic priest and the founder of Muintir na Tíre, a national rural community development organisation.

== Biography ==
Hayes was born in a Land League hut at Murroe, Co Limerick to a family languishing in poverty. One of ten siblings, seven of Hayes' brothers and sisters died of malnutrition and disease over a twelve-year period. The family had been evicted from Lord Cloncurry's estate in 1872 for non-payment of rent, forcing them into destitution. The family returned to the estate in 1894.

Hayes was educated by the Jesuits at Crescent College, Limerick and thereafter studied for the priesthood in St. Patrick's College, Thurles. In 1907 he went to the Irish College in Paris where he was ordained in 1913. Hayes enjoyed this time in France greatly, a period highlighted by the beatification of St Joan of Arc in 1909. From 1915 to 1924 he worked in Liverpool before returning to Ireland to serve as curate in Castleiney and later in Tipperary Town. Previous to 1916, Hayes was a supporter of the Irish Volunteers, and his brother Mick became a leading member of the Limerick Irish Republican Army, however, he effectively missed the Irish revolutionary period as he was sent to work in Liverpool between 1915 and 1924.

During the 1920s Hayes became an admirer of Benito Mussolini, with whom he was granted an audience during a visit to Rome in 1930. Hayes was intrigued by corporatism and came to believe it could uplift rural communities. Similarly, Hayes was influenced by continental movements such as the Belgian Boerenbond league, which encouraged rural inhabitants to form cooperatives.

Hayes came to national prominence with the foundation of Muintir na Tíre in 1937, a rural development organisation which had core principles of neighbourliness, self-help and self-sufficiency. It was to act as a rural self-help group based on collective parish organisation with a strong emphasis on the teaching of the papal encyclicals Rerum Novarum (1891) and Quadragesimo Anno (1931). Hayes was successfully able to draw on the power of the media, Irish newspapers and radio, to promote Muintir na Tíre and quickly became a figure of national prominence in doing so. In promoting and developing Muintir na Tíre Hayes resisted calls in some quarters to limit the membership to Catholics, remarking "this country is becoming so Catholic it forgets to be Christian". Nonetheless, under Hayes's leadership, there was eventually an overlap in membership between Muintir na Tíre and the Catholic fraternal organisation the Knights of Columbanus.

He was appointed parish priest of Bansha & Kilmoyler in County Tipperary in 1946. Due largely to his endeavours, a factory - Bansha Rural Industries - was started and enjoyed some success producing preserves for the Irish home market. Bansha was at the forefront in developing many Muintir na Tíre initiatives and for a time in the 1950s enjoyed the soubriquet of The Model Parish.

A lifelong teetotaller, a highlight of Hayes' career was his address to the Pioneer Total Abstinence Association in Croke Park in June 1949 to celebrate their 50th year of operation. The event was the largest Catholic gathering in Dublin since the 1932 Eucharistic Congress.

He spearheaded many initiatives including rural electrification, the "Parish Plan for Agriculture", and the setting up of small industries in rural areas in an attempt to stop emigration. He was later made a canon of his cathedral chapter. Hayes died in February 1957 in a Tipperary nursing home following a minor operation. His funeral in Bansha was a national occasion, attended by leaders of Church and State. His grave is at the rear of the Church of the Annunciation, Bansha. He was later commemorated on an Irish postage stamp.

== Sources ==
- Rynne, Stephen (1960). Father John Hayes: founder of Muintir na Tire, People of the Land. Clonmore and Reynolds.
