= Endo International =

Ireland-domiciled pharmaceutical company

Endo International plc
- Type: Public
- Traded as: Expert Market: ENDPQ; Nasdaq: ENDP
- ISIN: IE00BJ3V9050
- Industry: Pharmaceutical
- Predecessor: Endo Pharmaceuticals Inc. (before the 2014 tax inversion to Ireland)
- Founded: 1997; 29 years ago
- Headquarters: (Legal) Dublin, Ireland; (Operational) Malvern, Pennsylvania, United States
- Key people: Paul Campanelli (CEO); Blaise Coleman (CFO)
- Products: Adrenalin; Percocet; Supprelin LA; Testopel; Vasostrict; Xiaflex
- Revenue: ▲US$2,993 million (2021); US$2,903 million (2020)
- Operating income: ▼US$−547 million (2021); US$−27 million (2020)
- Net income: ▼US$−613 million (2021); US$184 million (2020)
- Total assets: ▲US$2,715 million (2021); US$2,413 million (2020)
- Number of employees: 3103 (2021)
- Website: endo.com

Endo International plc is an American Irish-domiciled generics and specialty branded pharmaceutical company that generated over 93% of its 2017 sales from the U.S. healthcare system. While Endo's management, operations, and customers are almost exclusively U.S.–based, in 2013 Endo executed a corporate tax inversion to Ireland to avoid U.S. corporate taxes on their U.S. drug sales, and to avail of Ireland's corporate tax system.

== History ==
In 1920, Intravenous Products of America was incorporated as a privately owned pharmaceutical business operating in New York. By 1935 it had changed its name to Endo Products. The product line focused on medication for the treatment of pain (e.g. Percodan), a focus which continued during its acquisition by DuPont in 1969 (e.g. Percocet).

Endo Pharmaceuticals Holdings was created as a result of a $277 million management buyout of the division from DuPont Merck in 1997, led by Carol Ammon. Through the merger with Algos, it changed name again to Endo Pharmaceuticals Holdings Inc. and began trading as a public company.

In 2012, shareholders voted to again change the name to Endo Health Solutions, with Endo Pharmaceuticals becoming a segment of the business. Through the 2014 acquisition of Paladin Labs and subsequent corporate restructuring, Endo International plc was formed.

Endo net sales by region (2017)
Region	Sales ($ m)	Distribution (%)
U.S. generic	2,281.0	65.8
U.S. branded	957.5	27.6
Non-U.S. / international	230.3	6.6
Total	3,468.8	100.0

=== 2022–2023 bankruptcy proceedings ===
In 2022, Endo's stock fell below $1 as the company faced restructuring of its $8 billion of debt.

On August 17, 2022 Endo International Plc filed for Chapter 11 bankruptcy protection after reaching a $6 billion deal with some of its creditors that related to opioid litigation in the US and a $6 billion deal with creditors, including for settling lawsuits.

The United States Department of Justice has objected to the plans, claiming they violate bankruptcy law.

=== Merger ===
In March 2025, Mallinckrodt and Endo announced plans to merge in a deal valued at $6.7 billion.

== Acquisitions ==
- 1999: Predecessor Endo Pharmaceuticals Holdings agreed to buy Algos Pharmaceutical Corporation, in a bid to gain additional products for the painkiller market.
- 2006: Endo acquired RxKinetix, leading to a fall in profits.
- 2009: Endo bought Indevus Pharmaceuticals to diversify into endocrinology and oncology. The company entered the male hypogonadism market later in 2010 with Fortesta 2% gel.
- 2010: Endo acquired generic manufacturer Qualitest Pharmaceuticals for $1.2 billion.
- 2011: Endo acquired medical device manufacturer American Medical Systems for more than $2 billion
- 2013: Endo agreed to purchase Paladin Labs Inc for about $1.6 billion to gain access to the Canadian market as well as expand into emerging markets. The acquisition was subsequently used via Canadian tax laws to execute a corporate tax inversion to Ireland. In July 2015, The Wall Street Journal noted Endo was using Ireland's lower tax rate to acquire U.S.–based life sciences firms and relocate them to Ireland's tax regime (i.e. they could afford to pay more to acquire U.S. competitors).
- 2014: In early 2014, Endo sought to acquire NuPathe, a speciality pharmaceutical developer, for $105 million. However, Teva prevailed in this acquisition with a substantially higher bid. In September 2014, Endo offered to buy Auxilium Pharmaceuticals and its portfolio in a then rejected offer, before acquiring the company the following month in a deal valued at $2.6 billion. This expanded Endo's portfolio to include 12 additional products, including a variery of testosterone preparations, and Xiaflex (a treatment for Peyronie's disease). In the same year, they also acquired Dava Pharmaceuticals.
- 2015: Endo acquired the specialty generics and sterile injectables company Par Pharmaceutical for $8.05 billion. The FTC required divestments of assets to Rising Pharmaceuticals for the deal to go through.
- 2018-19: Endo announced and then terminated a deal to acquire Somerset Therapeutics.
- 2020: Endo acquired BioSpecifics Technologies for more than $500 million.

== Lawsuits ==
=== Mesh ===
After facing lawsuits over its production of vaginal mesh implants, Endo shut down its production in 2016 to avoid further litigation It had set aside more than $2.6 billion to payments for such cases.

=== Opioids ===
Endo is one of the companies named in lawsuits by the states of Ohio, Missouri and Mississippi as responsible for the US opioid epidemic. Its 10-K statement indicates that a majority of the company's US revenue in 2016 was derived from the sale of prescription pain killers, predominantly opioids.

On June 8, 2017, the U.S. Food and Drug Administration (FDA) released a press statement in which it announced that it requested Endo to withdraw its opioid drug, oxymorphone hydrochloride (Opana ER), from the market. Opana has been linked to outbreaks of HIV, hepatitis C and serious blood disorders. It was the first time that the FDA had "taken steps to remove a currently marketed opioid pain medication from sale due to the public health consequences of abuse."

In 2021, New York Attorney General Letitia James filed a lawsuit against Endo and several other opioid manufacturers for their alleged contribution to the opioid epidemic in New York.

As part of Endo's 2022 bankruptcy proceedings, it agreed to spend more than $500 million settling opioid relating lawsuits. These proceedings now require Endo to turn over all court documents related to its role in the opioid crisis for publication in a public online archive.

In 2024, Endo agreed to a civil settlement of $464.9 million to resolve its civil liability under the federal False Claims Act by unlawfully promoting Opana ER, a dangerous opioid drug that was removed from the market by Endo at the FDA’s request.

==== Non-profit funding ====
Endo Pharmaceuticals at various times was a significant funder of the American Pain Foundation, which has been accused of producing misleading and biased materials relating to opiod prescribing. APF shut down in 2012 after the United States Senate Committee on Finance began an investigation into the relationships between narcotic manufacturers and pain advocacy organisations. APF cited "irreparable economic circumstances" in its decision to close.

=== Testosterone ===
In 2018, Endo paid $200 million to settle over 1,200 lawsuits related to its testosterone replacement therapy, Testim, and its undisclosed side effects.

== See also ==
- Corporate tax inversions
- Ireland as a tax haven
