= Slieve Felim Way =

Long-distance trail in Ireland

Slieve Felim way
- Length: 43 kilometres (27 miles)
- Location: Counties Limerick & Tipperary, Ireland
- Designation: National Waymarked Trail
- Trailheads: Murroe, County Limerick, Silvermines, County Tipperary
- Use: Hiking
- Elevation gain/loss: +870 m (2,854 ft)
- Difficulty: Moderate
- Season: Any

The Slieve Felim way is a long-distance trail through the Slieve Felim Mountains in Ireland. It is 43 kilometres (27 miles) long, beginning in Murroe, County Limerick and ending in Silvermines, County Tipperary. It is typically completed in two days.

== Management ==
The trail is designated as a National Waymarked Trail by the National Trails Office of the Irish Sports Council and is managed by Shannon Development and Coillte.

== Route ==
The trail begins in the village of Murroe and follows the road past Glenstal Abbey before crossing forestry along the slopes of the Slieve Felim Mountains to reach the village of Toor. From Toor, the Way crosses the flanks of Keeper Hill in the Silvermine Mountains before following the road into Silvermines village.

A review of the National Waymarked Trails in 2010 found multiday and day usage of the trail to be low and recommended a review and strengthening of the trail management structures.
