= R660 road (Ireland) =

Road in Ireland

R660 road
- Bóthar R660
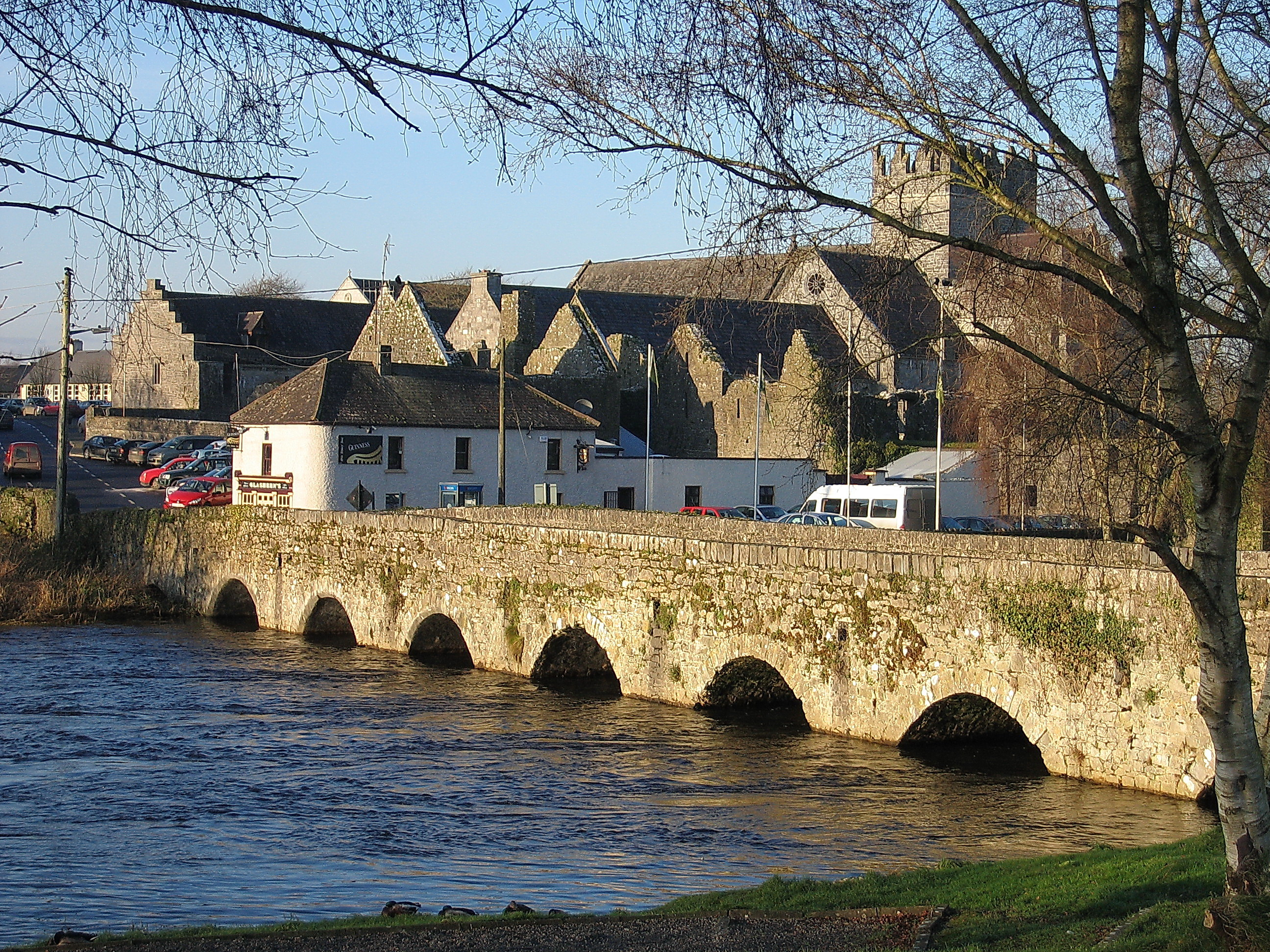
- R660 crossing the Suir at Holycross

Route information
- Length: 21 km (13 mi)

Location
- Country: Ireland
- Primary destinations: County Tipperary; Cashel leave Town Centre at junction with the R639; Boherlahan; Crosses the River Suir; Holycross – (R659), (R661); Crosses the Dublin-Cork railway line; Thurles terminates in town square at junction with N62, R498, R659, N75

Highway system
- Roads in Ireland; Motorways; Primary; Secondary; Regional

The R660 road is a regional road in County Tipperary, Ireland, which runs south–north from the Cashel to Thurles. En route it passes through the village of Holycross, where it crosses the River Suir and passes the walls of Holy Cross Abbey. The route is 21 km (13 mi) long.

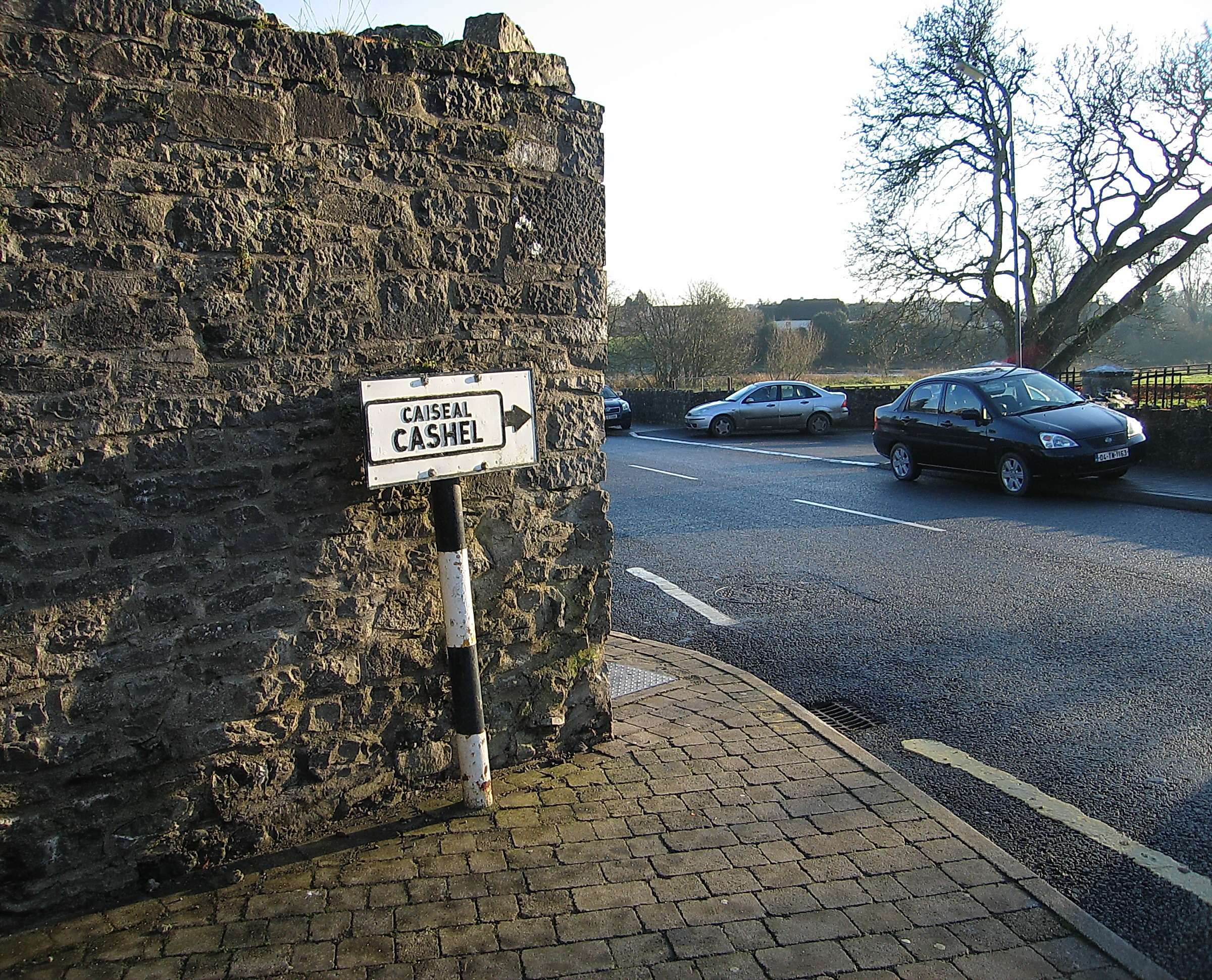
R660 in Holycross

== See also ==
- Roads in Ireland
- National primary road
- National secondary road
