= R505 road (Ireland) =

Road in Ireland

R505 road
- Bóthar R505
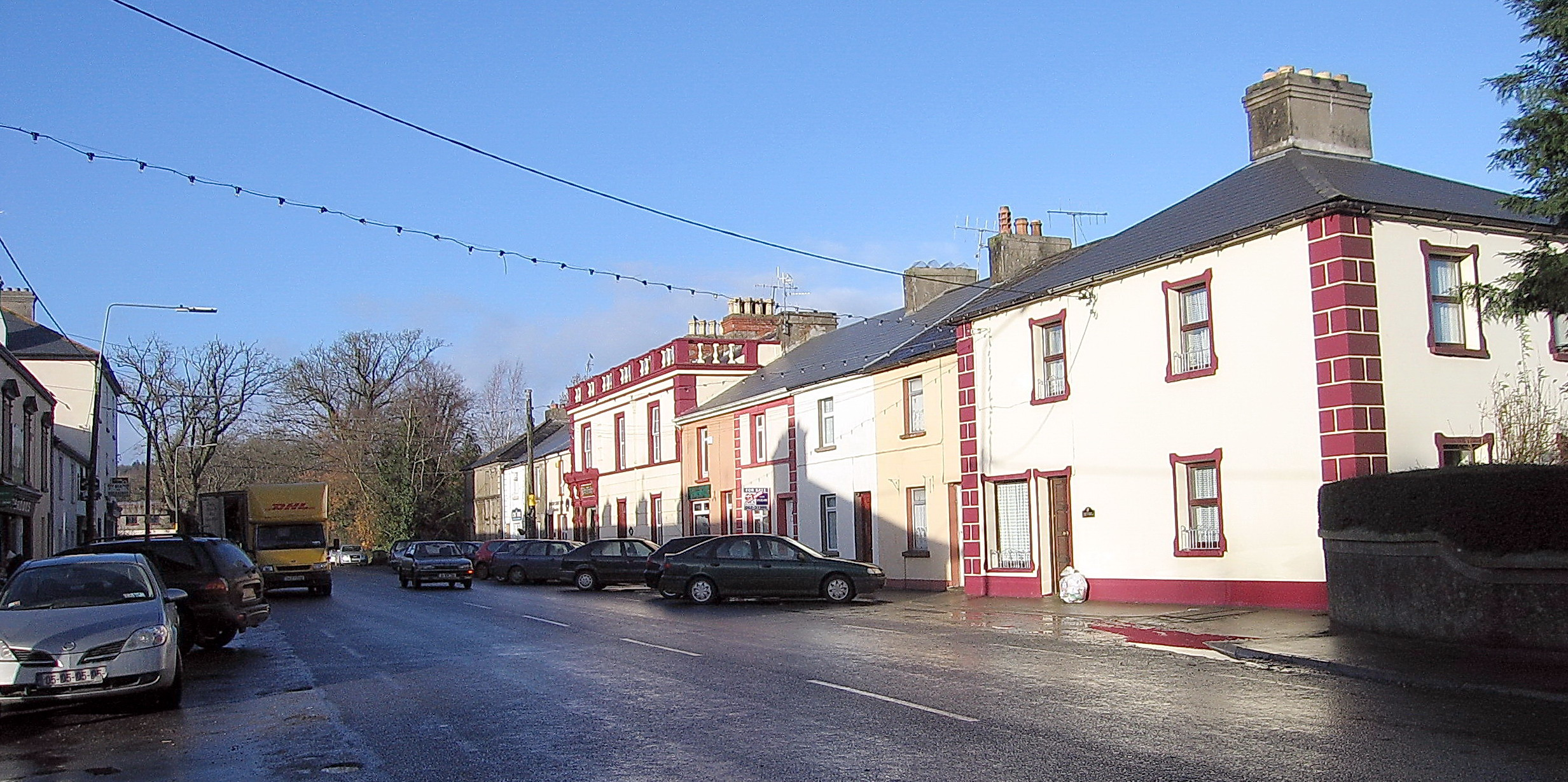
- Main Street, Dundrum, on the R505

Route information
- Length: 45 km (28 mi)

Location
- Country: Ireland
- Primary destinations: County Tipperary; Crosses the River Suir; Dundrum joins/leaves the R661, crosses the Dublin-Cork railway line; Annacarty; (R497); Cappawhite; County Limerick; Doon – (R507); Cappamore – (R506 at Dromsally); Terminates at the N24

Highway system
- Roads in Ireland; Motorways; Primary; Secondary; Regional

The R505 road is a regional road in Ireland which runs east-west from Cashel, County Tipperary to the N24 southeast of Limerick City. En route it passes through Dundrum and Cappawhite in County Tipperary and Doon and Cappamore in County Limerick. The road is 45 km (28 mi) long.

== See also ==
- Roads in Ireland
- National primary road
- National secondary road
