= R507 road (Ireland) =

Road in County Limerick, Ireland

R507 road
- Bóthar R507

Route information
- Length: 8 km (5.0 mi)

Location
- Country: Ireland
- Primary destinations: County Limerick; N24 at Cluggin Cross; Derraun Bridge; Doon – (R505)

Highway system
- Roads in Ireland; Motorways; Primary; Secondary; Regional

The R507 road is a regional road in the east of County Limerick, Ireland which runs south-north from its junction with the N24 national road at Cluggin Cross (near the village of Oola) and its junction with the R505 regional road in the village of Doon.

The road is 8 km (5.0 mi) long.

== See also ==
- Roads in Ireland
- National primary road
- National secondary road
