= Cappamore =

Town in County Limerick, Ireland

Cappamore An Cheapach Mhór
- Town
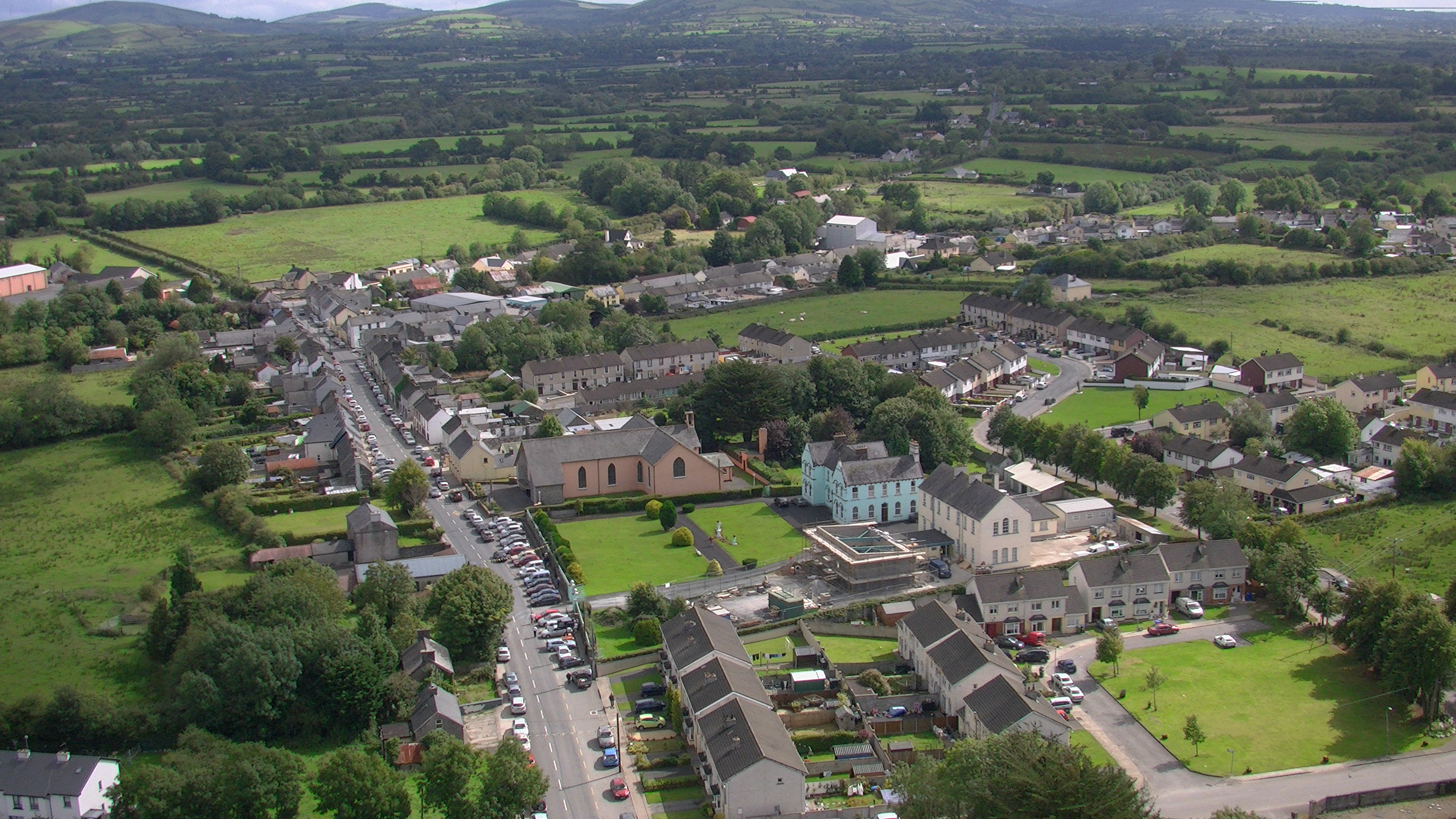

- Location in Ireland
- Coordinates: 52°36′52″N 8°20′22″W
- Country: Ireland
- Province: Munster
- County: County Limerick

Population (2022)
  - Total: 668
- Time zone: UTC+0 (WET)
  - Summer (DST): UTC-1 (IST (WEST))
- Irish Grid Reference: R767516

Cappamore (Irish: An Cheapach Mhór, meaning 'the large tillage plot') is a small town in northeast County Limerick in the midwest of Ireland. It is also a parish in the Roman Catholic Archdiocese of Cashel and Emly.

== Location and facilities ==
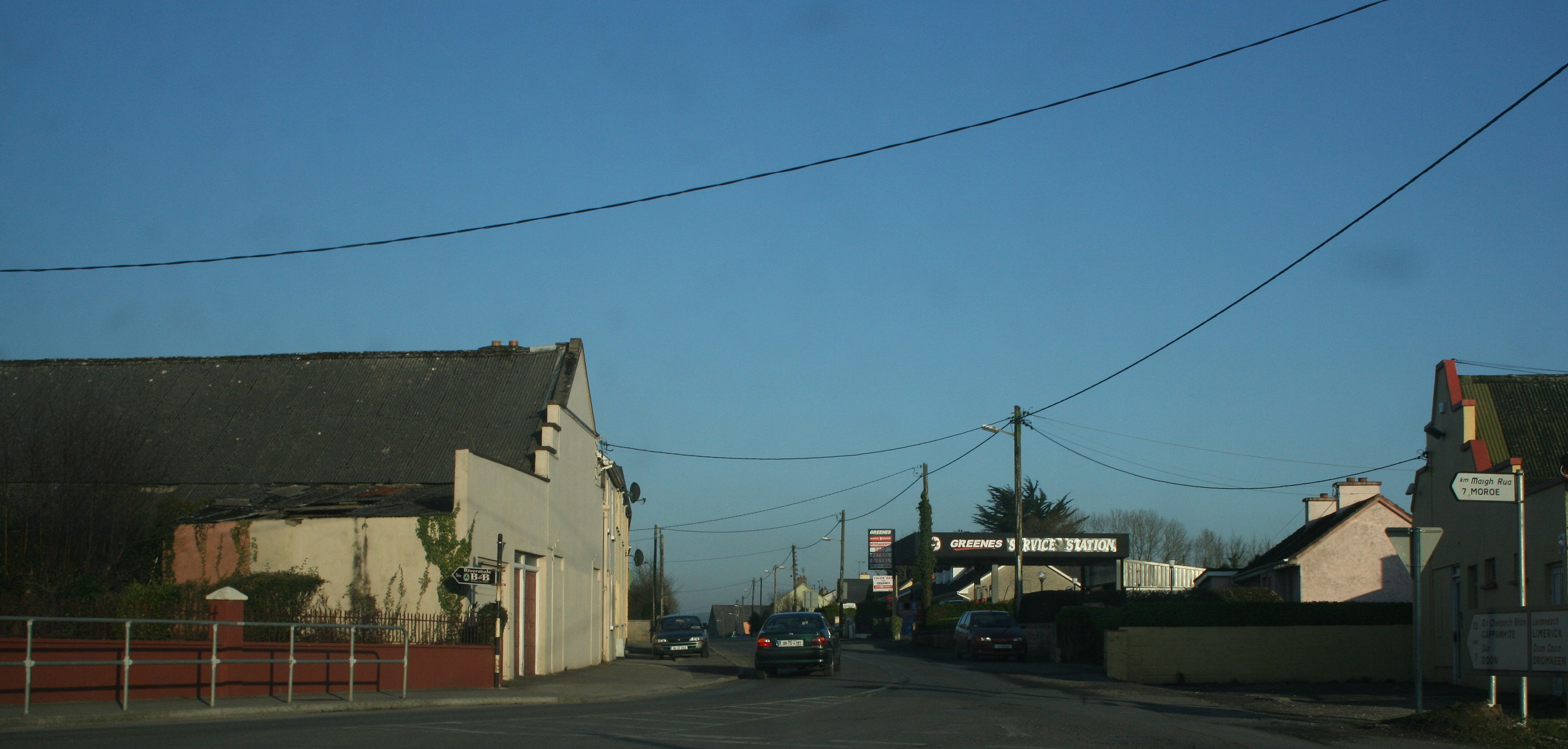
R505 through Cappamore

Cappamore is 20 km east of Limerick city, on the banks of the Mulcair River. The village is overlooked by the Slieve Felim Mountains and is on the R505 road (Limerick city centre is 23 km by road). It has a rich agricultural hinterland in which the dairy industry is prominent.

The town has several pubs, grocery shops and filling stations, a GP surgery, pharmacy, bookmaker shop and veterinary clinic. Other services include a library and arts studios complex, a church, community centre and day care centre. The village also has a fire brigade serving the surrounding area.

The town hosts an annual Agricultural Show in August each year.

Cappamore is officially twinned with Langonnet in Brittany, France since 2011.

== Education ==
There are three primary schools in Cappamore: Bilboa National School, Tineteriffe National School, and Scoil Chaitríona.

The village is home to a campus for the Limerick and Clare Education and Training Board College of Further Education & Training. This is on the site of the former St. Michael's Technical School, a secondary school that existed in the village up to 2013 when it amalgamated with the two second-level schools in Doon to create Scoil na Trionóide Naofa.

== Transport ==
Cappamore is served by Bus Éireann route 332 - travelling westwards to Limerick City via Murroe, Newport and eastwards to Cashel which operates up to seven times daily in both directions.

Limerick Junction train station is located 20 kilometres from Cappamore and has Iarnród Éireann services to Dublin, Cork, Kerry and Waterford. Limerick train station is 23 kilometres away with services to Dublin and Galway.

The nearest airport is Shannon, located 50 kilometres away with services to the UK, mainland Europe and North America.

== History ==
The famine years hit the area particularly badly, with the parish of Cappamore losing half of its population. Cappamore Historical Society produced a major publication on the history of the area in 1992 entitled "Cappamore: A Parish History".

== Sport ==
Cappamore has a number of sports clubs. Cappamore GAA and Camogie club organises hurling, camogie and Gaelic football teams at all levels. The club has won the Limerick Senior Hurling Championship on five occasions: 1904, 1954, 1956, 1958 and 1964.

Cappamore Celtic FC is the local soccer club catering for adult and underage teams, both male and female.

The local athletics club is Bilboa AC.

== People ==
Notable people from Cappamore include:

- David Gleeson, Irish film director and writer.
- William O'Connor, professional darts player.
- Seamus Coffey, economist and chair of the Irish Fiscal Advisory Council.
- John Hayes, former international rugby player.
- Rosemary Ryan, Olympian.
- Noel Mooney, former footballer and sports administrator.

== See also ==
- List of towns and villages in Ireland
