= Muintir na Tíre =

Irish volunteer organisation

- Founded: 1937; 89 years ago
- Type: Community development, rural development
- Location: Ireland
- Website: www.muintir.ie

Muintir na Tíre (Irish pronunciation: [ˈmˠɪn̠ʲtʲəɾʲ n̪ˠə ˈtʲiːɾʲə], meaning "People of the Country") is a national Irish voluntary organisation that promotes community and rural development.

Canon John Hayes founded the organisation in 1937.

== Past presidents ==
- Canon John Hayes Founder: 1937-1957
- Canon Maurice Morrissey 1957-1963
- Very Rev. Ray Browne 1963-1967
- Very Rev. Patrick Purcell 1967-1971
- Con Lucey 1973-1976
- Very Rev. John Stapleton 1976-1980
- Michael J. Lynch 1980-1983 & 1986-1994
- Lt. Col. Jim O’Brien 1983-1984
- Sean Hegarty 1984-1986 & 2001-2004
- Jim Quigley 1994-2001
- Margaret O’Doherty 2004-2007
- Martin Quinn 2008-2011

The list was compiled from a picture supplied by Tom Fitzgerald, the Chief Administrative Officer from 1947 to his retirement.
