= Keeper Hill =

Mountain in County Tipperary, Ireland

Keeper Hill / Slievekimalta
- Sliabh Coimeálta
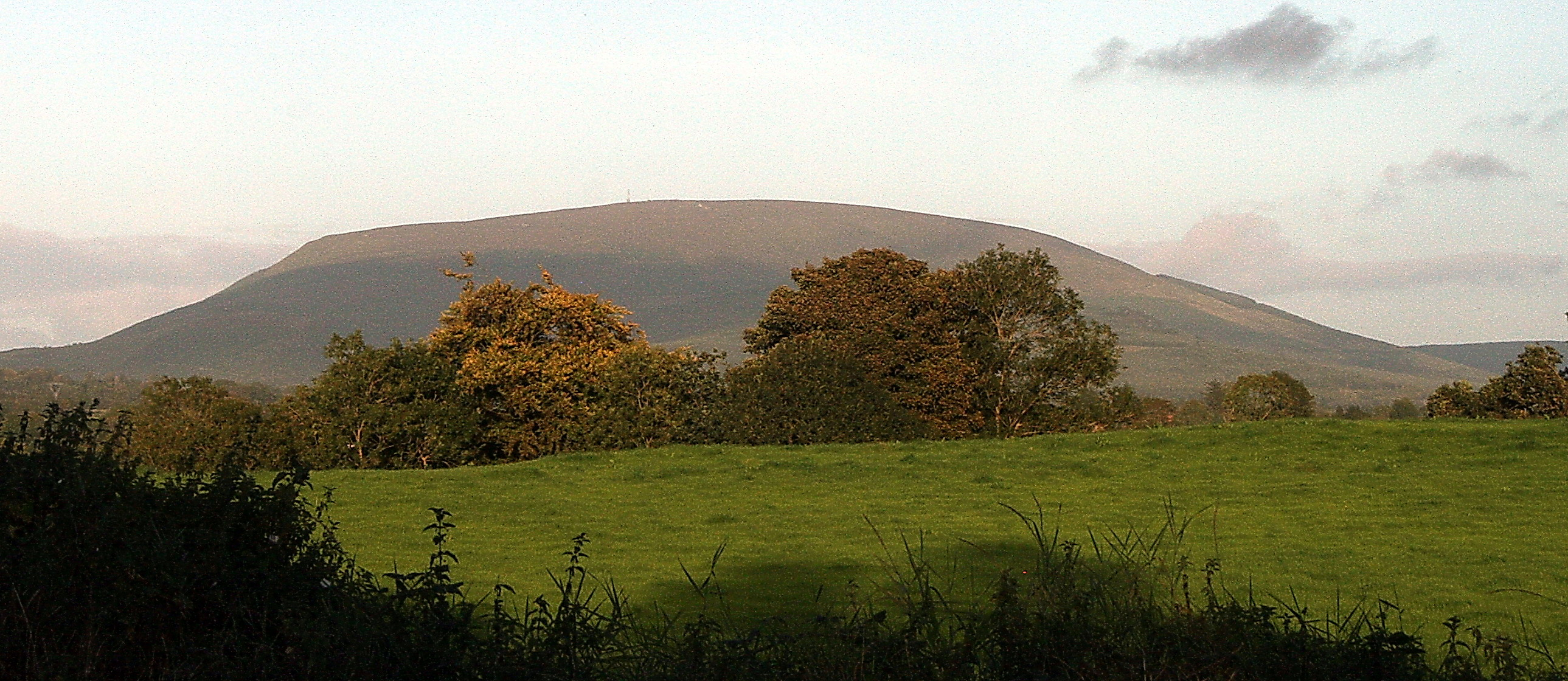
- Viewed from the west

Highest point
- Elevation: 694 m (2,277 ft)
- Prominence: 627 m (2,057 ft)
- Listing: P600, Marilyn, Hewitt
- Coordinates: 52.751°N 8.260°W

Geography
- Location within island of Ireland
- Location: County Tipperary, Ireland
- Parent range: Silvermine Mountains
- OSI/OSNI grid: R823667
- Topo map: OSi Discovery 59

Climbing
- Easiest route: Way marked from Doonane carpark through Ballyhourigan woods

Keeper Hill or Slievekimalta (from Irish Sliabh Coimeálta, meaning 'mountain of guarding') is a mountain with a height of 694 metres (2,277 ft) in the Silvermine Mountains of County Tipperary, Ireland. Traditionally, it was deemed to be part of the Slieve Felim Mountains.

== Name ==
Keeper Hill, also known as Slievekimalta, (Anglicised version of the original Irish name Sliabh Coimeálta) gets its name from a little-known tale about Sadb, daughter of Conn of the Hundred Battles, raising her children Eogan and Indderb on this mountain after they had been rejected by their father Ailill Aulom, king of Munster.

== Geography ==
The mountain is about 15 km east of Limerick City. Keeper Hill is the highest mountain in the Silvermines (and the wider Shannon area) and the 58th highest in Ireland. There is a stone circle in Bauraglanna townland on the northeastern slopes, known as Firbrega ('false men').

== Access to the summit ==
There is a looped walk around the lower shoulders of Keeper Hill, to which the ‘hardy’ walker can add the ‘trek’ to the summit. This loop walk is part of the National Looped Walks and is marked using the standard purple National Looped Walk directional arrows.

Historically, a Lughnasadh gathering was held on the summit each August.

== Conservation ==
On the slopes of Keeper Hill is a woodland of 3,300 hectares, mostly of non-native conifers. The 300 hectare summit is blanket bog and Nardus grassland, considered of ecological importance. Keeper Hill is designated a Special Area of Conservation.

== See also ==
- Lists of mountains in Ireland
- List of mountains of the British Isles by height
- List of P600 mountains in the British Isles
- List of Marilyns in the British Isles
- List of Hewitt mountains in England, Wales and Ireland
