= Mulkear River =

Tributary of the Shannon in western Ireland

Mulcair Mulkear
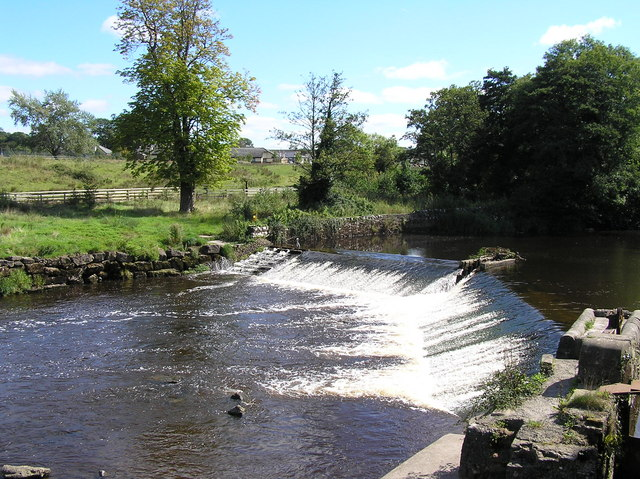
- River Mulcair Weir, Annacotty
- Etymology: Irish maol + cearn, (Ancient male name)
- Native name: An Mhaoilchearn (Irish)

Location
- Country: Ireland

Physical characteristics
- Source: Slieve Felim Mountains Silvermine Mountains
- Mouth: River Shannon
  - coordinates: 52°40′50″N 08°32′45″W
  - elevation: 8 m (26 ft)
- Length: 21.5 km (13.4 mi)
- Basin size: 650 km^{2} (250 sq mi)
- Discharge
  - average: 12.55 m^{3}/s (443 cu ft/s)

Basin features
- River system: Shannon
- Tributaries
  - right: River Slievenohera

The River Mulcair, or Mulkear, rises in the Slieve Felim Mountains and Silvermine Mountains in Ireland, and flows through the east of County Limerick before joining the River Shannon outside Limerick city near Annacotty.

It flows through Counties Limerick and Tipperary with a catchment area of 650 km2. The principal tributaries are the Dead River, the Bilboa River at Cappamore, and the Newport River (Tipperary).

The River Mulcair is an Atlantic salmon and brown trout river with a 1 March to 30 September fishing season. The river is designated as catch and release for salmon. The ESB issue and monitor fishing permits for the river.
