= Silvermine Mountains =

Mountain range in Tipperary, Ireland

- Sliabh an Airgid
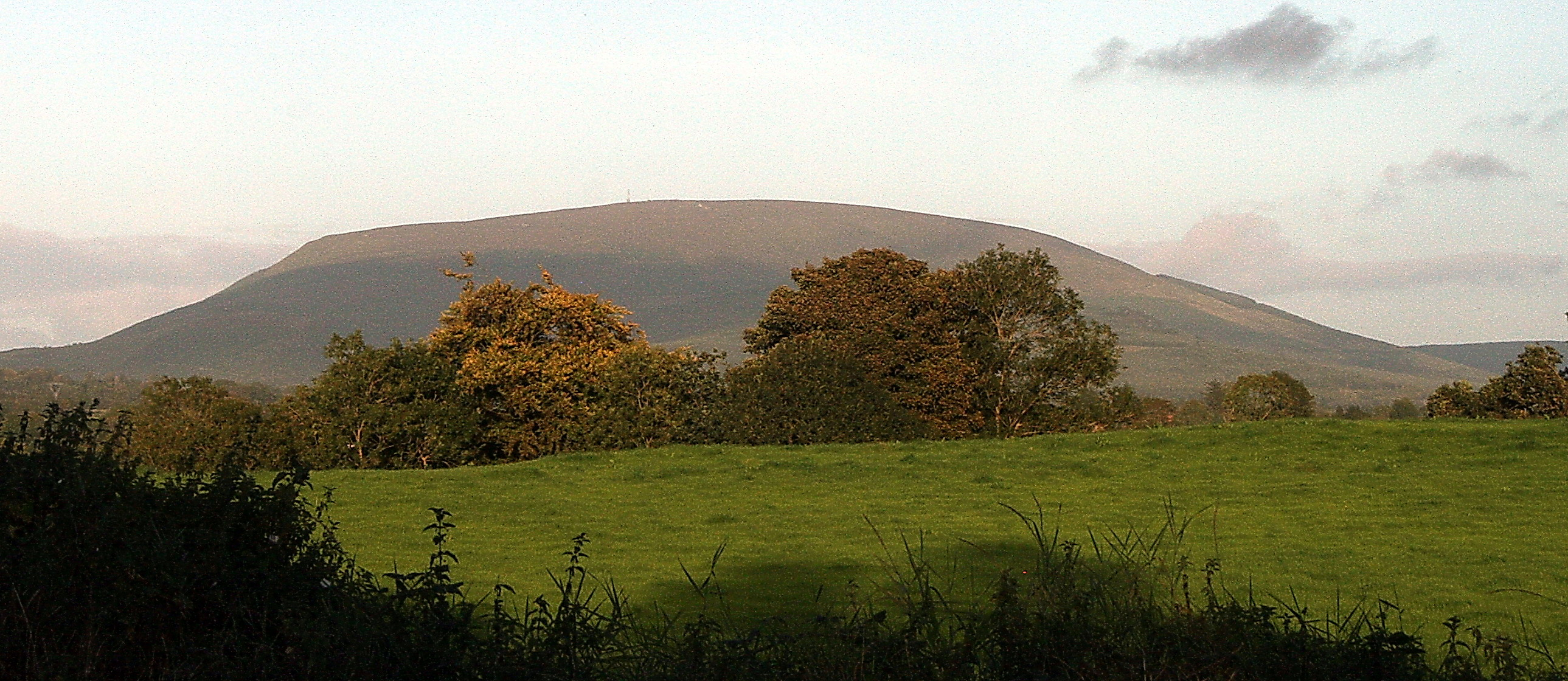
- Keeper Hill

Highest point
- Peak: Keeper Hill
- Elevation: 694 m (2,277 ft)
- Coordinates: 52°47′N 8°15′W

Geography
- Country: Ireland
- Provinces of Ireland: Munster

The Silvermine Mountains or Silvermines Mountains (Irish: Sliabh an Airgid) are a mountain range in County Tipperary, Ireland. The highest peak of the range is Keeper Hill or Slievekimalta at 694 metres (2,277 ft) high. Traditionally, the mountains were deemed to be part of the Slieve Felim Mountains.

The village of Silvermines is located to the north of the mountains and has been a mining centre since the 17th century.

There are three Special Areas of Conservation on the Silvermine Mountains; the Silvermine Mountains SAC is known for its Northern Atlantic wet heaths, with Erica tetralix and species-rich Nardus grassland; the Silvermines Mountains West SAC is known for its Northern Atlantic wet heaths, with Erica tetralix, and its European dry heaths and Calaminarian grasslands where the levels of heavy metals, such as lead, are high, and are toxic to many plant species; and Keeper Hill SAC, known for its Northern Atlantic wet heaths with Erica tetralix and blanket bogs.

== History ==
The oldest records of mine workings here date to 1289. Silver was extracted for use in coinage, and lead for materials for the roof of new monasteries being built in the 13th century. Mining continued sporadically over the next 600 years. By the mid-nineteenth century, there were three engine houses with beam engines for crushing, winding and pumping. A new phase of activity occurred in the 1960s when a new rich deposit was found which was worked on the surface and underground. Operations ceased in 1984 but left behind them waste tips and tailings ponds.

== Slieve Felim Way ==
The Slieve Felim Way, a 43-kilometre (27 mi) long-distance trail through the Silvermine and Slieve Felim Mountains has a trail-head in the village of Silvermines. It is designated as a National Waymarked Trail by the National Trails Office of the Irish Sports Council and is managed by Shannon Development and Coillte.
