= Slieve Felim Mountains =

Mountain range in Munster, Ireland

Coordinates: 52.67°N 8.28°W

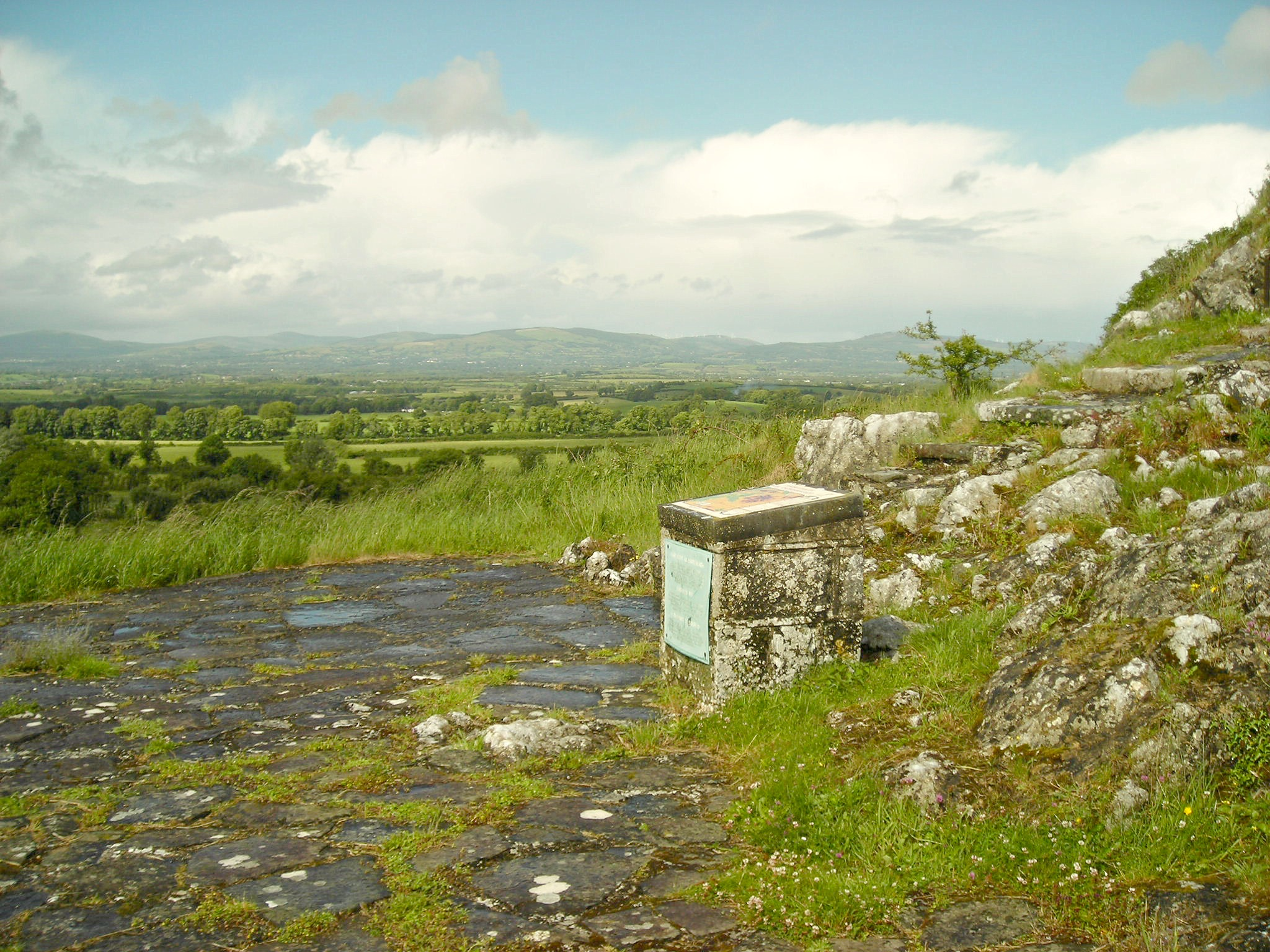
Sarsfield's Rock and the Slieve Felim Mountains

The Slieve Felim Mountains (Irish: Sliabh Eibhlinne) are a mountain range in Munster, Ireland. They cover parts of County Limerick and County Tipperary. Historically, the name "Slieve Felim" meant the whole mountainous area between Murroe, Silvermines, Borrisoleigh and Dundrum, including the Silvermine Mountains and Mauherslieve. However, today the name usually only applies to the southwestern part, made up of Slieve Felim (427 metres (1,401 ft)), Cullaun (460 metres (1,510 ft)), Knockastanna (444 metres (1,457 ft)) and Gortnageragh (418 metres (1,371 ft)).

Sliabh Eibhlinne means "mountains of Ébliu", an ancient goddess. In the Lebor Gabála Érenn (The Book of the Taking of Ireland), the newly-arrived Milesians meet the goddess Fódla on these mountains, and she asks them to name the island after her. Fódla thus became a poetic name for Ireland. In the early modern era, the name Eibhlinne became confused with the more common male name Féilim, and so the mountains became known in English as Slieve Felim.

Name confusion: after the Siege of Clonmel Phelim O'Neill, a leader of the defenders of the town, was ordered to transplant to Connacht. He and his party and chattels are listed in the Cromwellian records. He got as far as the Slieve Phelim mountains and settled there and so his name superseded Eiblú's.

== Slieve Felim Way ==
The Slieve Felim Way is a long-distance trail through the Mountainsthat begins in Murroe, County Limerick and ends in Silvermines, County Tipperary.

== Sources ==
- Fewer, Michael (1996). The Way-marked Trails of Ireland. Dublin: Gill & Macmillan. ISBN 0-7171-2386-3.
- National Trails Office (2010). "Setting New Directions. A review of National Waymarked Ways in Ireland" (PDF). Dublin: Irish Sports Council. Archived from the original (PDF) on 31 May 2011.
