= Jimmy Humphreys =

Irish hurler

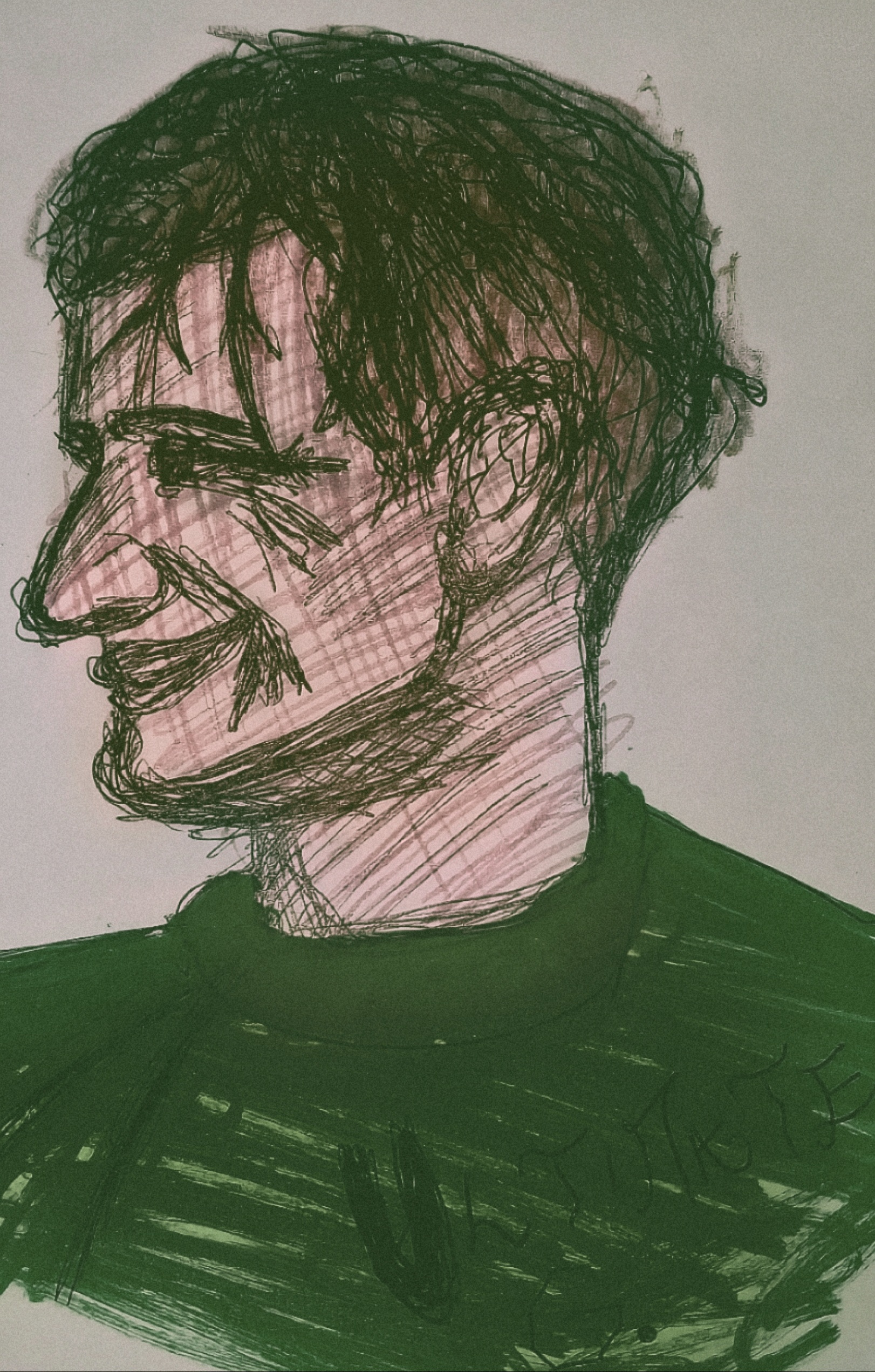
- Art work depicting Jimmy Humphreys, based on archive photographs from 1924

Personal information
- Born: 10 February 1894 Murroe, County Limerick, Ireland
- Died: 23 December 1956 (aged 62) Murroe, County Limerick, Ireland
- Occupation: Farmer

Sport
- Sport: Hurling
- Position: Midfield
Clubs
- Years: Club
- Cappamore; Claughaun
Club titles
- Limerick titles: 1
Inter-county
- Years: County
- 1910s-1920s: Limerick
Inter-county titles
- Munster titles: 3
- All-Irelands: 2

James Humphreys (10 February 1894 – 23 December 1956) was an Irish hurler who played as a midfielder for the Limerick senior team.

== Early life ==
Jimmy Humphreys was born 10 February 1894 at Glenstal, Murroe, Co. Limerick, Ireland, from Tim Humphreys and Bridget Lane of Quinpool. Humphreys came from a family with a strong hurling tradition; his father, Tim, had been instrumental in forming the first Murroe hurling team shortly after the formation of the GAA, which later won the first Limerick senior county hurling title. He was a grandson of James Humphrys of Glenstal, known as "the Squire".

== Playing career ==
Humphreys was a regular member of the starting fifteen for over a decade from the 1910s until the 1920s. During that time he won two All-Ireland medals and three Munster medals. He captined the Irish hurling team that travelled to New York in 1921. He was also captain of the Ireland team during the 1924 Tailteann Games, which was the first international hurling competition featuring teams representing the United States, England, Scotland, and Wales. He was presented with a silver cup presented by John Devoy.

At club level Humphreys played with both Cappamore and Claughaun, winning a county championship medal with the latter. The Senior Colleges Cup and the GAA playing fields in Murroe are named after Humphreys.

=== 1918 All-Ireland title ===
Humphreys was part of the Limerick team that won the 1918 All-Ireland Senior Hurling Championship, defeating Wexford in a final played at Croke Park on 26 January 1919 after a lengthy delay caused by the political disruption of the period.

=== 1919–1920: disrupted championships ===
The 1919 championship saw Limerick reach the Munster final, where they were beaten by Cork. The 1920 championship was played against the backdrop of the Irish War of Independence; a Munster semi-final against Tipperary went ahead in secret outside Cork city, which was then under martial law and where the British authorities had prohibited the fixture, before Limerick lost the final to Cork in a match repeatedly postponed and not completed until April 1922.

=== 1921 All-Ireland title ===
Limerick won the 1921 Munster final against Cork, eventually played on 28 May 1922, and went on to win the 1921 All-Ireland Senior Hurling Championship final against Dublin, a fixture delayed by the Irish Civil War and not played until 4 March 1923, with the ball thrown in by the opera singer Joseph O'Mara.

=== 1923 Munster title and All-Ireland final ===
Humphreys captained Limerick to the 1923 Munster title, defeating Tipperary in a final played on 16 March 1924 following a drawn first game. Limerick then contested the 1923 All-Ireland Senior Hurling Championship final against Galway at Croke Park on 14 September 1924, losing the game.

=== 1924 Munster final ===
Limerick were beaten by Tipperary in the 1924 Munster final, played on 5 October 1924.

=== Tailteann Games, 1924 ===
Beyond his county career, Humphreys captained both Munster and Ireland in hurling at the inaugural Tailteann Games, held in Dublin in August 1924. As Ireland's captain he played in the inaugural International Hurling Competition, contested by Ireland, the United States, England, Scotland and Wales, in which Ireland defeated the United States in the final on 10 August 1924. The cup was presented to Humphreys by the veteran Fenian John Devoy, who had travelled from New York for the games. In the accompanying inter-provincial series, Munster, captained by Humphreys, lost the final to Leinster.

== Irish War of Independence ==
For his role in the Irish War of Independence, he was awarded a military pension, and had a guard of honour at his funeral. He was a grandson of James Humphrys, and nephew by marriage of Nell Humphreys.

== Personal life and family ==
Humphreys married Margaret "Gretta" O'Dwyer of Corelish, near New Pallasgreen, County Limerick, on 14 August 1923 at Nicker Roman Catholic church. He later inherited the family farm at Glenstal, County Limerick, and was also active in greyhound coursing, breeding dogs in Limerick and winning the Irish Cup at Croom in 1929.

Jimmy Humphreys is also a cousin to MEP Paddy Lane and Senator Richard Hourigan.

Notable family members
- John Hourigan (early 18th century), of The Hill, Knocknagorteeny and Annagh, County Limerick
  - John "Jack" Hourigan (b. c. 1760), of Annagh
    - John "Jack" Hourigan, of Annagh; m. Mary O'Brien
      - John Hourigan (1819–1883), of Annagh; m. Catherine Ryan
        - Patrick Hourigan (1849–1888), of The Hill; m. Mary Ryan
          - Mary Hourigan (b. 1884); m. Robert Paul Gill (1863–1928), brother of T. P. Gill, MP
            - Tomás Mac Giolla (born Thomas Gill, 1924–2010), TD; president of Sinn Féin and later leader of the Workers' Party; Lord Mayor of Dublin, 1993–1994
        - Richard "Rick" Hourigan (1856–1923), of Ahane; m. Margaret Smyth
          - James Hourigan (1893–1973), of Annagh; m. Mona Lane (1903–1970) (see below[B1])
            - Senator Richard Hourigan (1939–2002), farmer; Fine Gael member of Seanad Éireann for the agricultural panel, 1982–1987 and 1989–1993; m. Nora Humphreys
            - Councillor Patrick "Paddy" Hourigan, Cathaoirleach (chairman) of Limerick County Council, 1993–1994, and councillor from 1972 to 2004 (Castleconnell electoral area); m. Anne
          - Patrick Hourigan (1895–1975), of Ahane; m. Eileen McGrath (see below[B2])
            - Michael Hourigan, Fine Gael member of Limerick City Council; twice mayor of Limerick; m. Patricia Murphy
              - Niamh Hourigan, sociologist; vice-president for academic affairs at Mary Immaculate College, Limerick; Labour Party candidate for the European Parliament in 2024 (Ireland South constituency)
              - Neasa Hourigan (b. 1980), Green Party TD for Dublin Central, 2020–2024; chair of the Committee on Budgetary Oversight, 2020–2023
    - Margaret Hourigan; m. Tim Ryan, of Newross, County Tipperary
      - Honora Ryan (1816–1887); m. James Foley (1805–1854)
        - Margaret Foley (b. 1837); m. Michael McGrath
          - Joseph McGrath
            - Eileen McGrath; m. Patrick Hourigan (1895–1975), of Ahane (see above[B2])
          - Joanna McGrath (1863–1941); m. Patrick Lane (1855–1927), of Parteen, County Clare (uncle of Jimmy Humphreys)
            - Patrick Lane (Royal Army Medical Corps) (1896–1968), physician; served in the Royal Army Medical Corps during World War I, awarded the Military Cross; afterwards worked for Limerick County Council as a physician, tuberculosis officer and school examiner; featured in the permanent exhibition at Limerick Museum
            - Mona Lane (1903–1970); m. James Hourigan (1893–1973), of Annagh (see above[B1])
            - Thomas Lane (1900–1955)
              - Patrick "Paddy" Lane (1934–2012), president of the Irish Farmers' Association, 1976–1980; MEP for Munster, 1989–1994; rugby union international for Ireland in 1964
                - Tom "Tommy" Lane, County Clare chairman of the Irish Farmers' Association
      - Margaret Ryan (1819–1909); m. James Humphrys (1805–1899), of Glenstal, County Limerick
        - Tim Humphreys; m. Bridget Lane
          - Jimmy Humphreys, hurler
        - David Humphreys (1861–1903); m. Nell Rahilly (sister of The O'Rahilly)
          - Dick Humphreys (1896–1968)
          - Sheila Humphreys; m. Patrick O'Donoghue
            - Cróine Magan (née O'Donoghue)
              - Manchán Magan (b. 1970), musician, broadcaster, writer and advocate for the rights of Irish Travellers; presenter on Raidió na Gaeltachta and several RTÉ programmes; multiple IMRO award winner; cultural commentator on the history and music of the Irish Travellers
              - Ruán Magan (b. 1968), director, producer, writer and creator

== Death ==
Jimmy Humphreys died 23 December 1956 in Murroe, County Limerick, Ireland aged 62.
