= Dick Humphreys =

Former IRA member

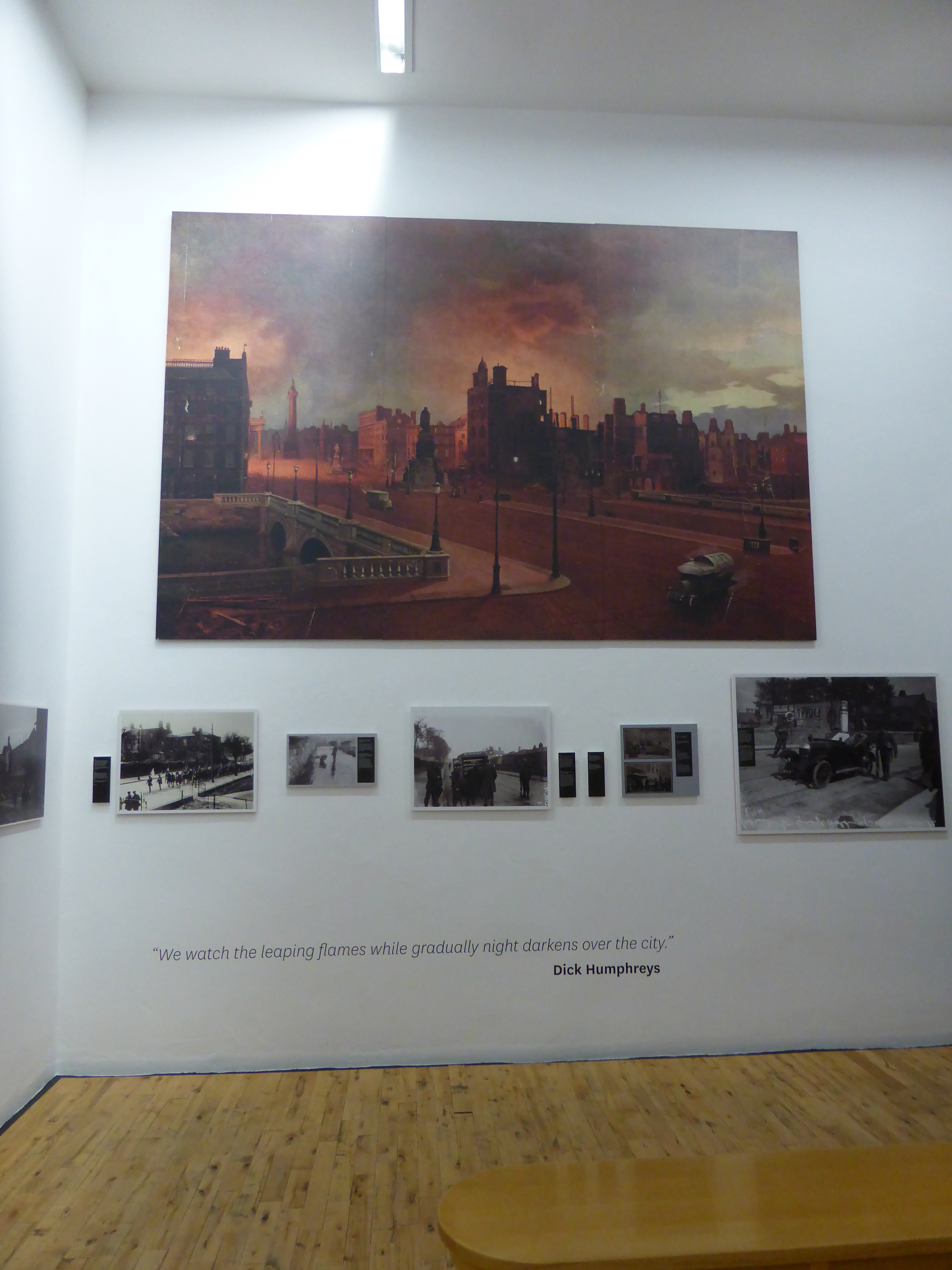
Dick Humphreys memoir extract, National Library Easter Rising exhibition, 2016

Dick Humphreys (23 April 1896 – 20 September 1968) was a member of the Irish Volunteers and participated in the Easter Rising in 1916, serving in the General Post Office with his uncle, The O'Rahilly.

== Early life ==
Born in Limerick in 1896, Humphreys was a son of Dr. David Humphreys and Nell Humphreys and a brother of Sheila Humphreys. In Limerick, he attended Crescent College from 1905 to 1909. The family moved to Dublin in 1909 and was a pupil in Padraig Pearse's school, St. Enda's, in Ranelagh and later in Rathfarnham when the school moved there.

== Activism and career ==
After the Easter Rising, Humphreys was arrested and detained in Wakefield Prison where he wrote an account of the events of Easter Week of 1916. He was a member of the IRA during the War of Independence, 1919–21, and was imprisoned in Mountjoy Prison where he went on hunger strike. In November 1920 he qualified as a barrister in King's Inns. As part of the 50 year commemoration of the rising in 1966 his reminiscences of Easter week were recorded by RTÉ. An excerpt from his account of the rising formed part of the 2016 commemorative exhibition by the National Library of Ireland.

== Family ==
- John Hourigan (early 18th century), of The Hill, Knocknagorteeny and Annagh, County Limerick
  - John "Jack" Hourigan (b. c. 1760), of Annagh
    - John "Jack" Hourigan, of Annagh; m. Mary O'Brien
      - John Hourigan (1819–1883), of Annagh; m. Catherine Ryan
        - Patrick Hourigan (1849–1888), of The Hill; m. Mary Ryan
          - Mary Hourigan (b. 1884); m. Robert Paul Gill (1863–1928), brother of T. P. Gill, MP
            - Tomás Mac Giolla (born Thomas Gill, 1924–2010), TD; president of Sinn Féin and later leader of the Workers' Party; Lord Mayor of Dublin, 1993–1994
        - Richard "Rick" Hourigan (1856–1923), of Ahane; m. Margaret Smyth
          - James Hourigan (1893–1973), of Annagh; m. Mona Lane (1903–1970) (see below[A])
            - Senator Richard Hourigan (1939–2002), farmer; Fine Gael member of Seanad Éireann for the agricultural panel, 1982–1987 and 1989–1993; m. Nora Humphreys
            - Councillor Patrick "Paddy" Hourigan, Cathaoirleach (chairman) of Limerick County Council, 1993–1994, and councillor from 1972 to 2004 (Castleconnell electoral area); m. Anne
          - Patrick Hourigan (1895–1975), of Ahane; m. Eileen McGrath (see below[B])
            - Michael Hourigan, Fine Gael member of Limerick City Council; twice mayor of Limerick; m. Patricia Murphy
              - Niamh Hourigan, sociologist; vice-president for academic affairs at Mary Immaculate College, Limerick; Labour Party candidate for the European Parliament in 2024 (Ireland South constituency)
              - Neasa Hourigan (b. 1980), Green Party TD for Dublin Central, 2020–2024; chair of the Committee on Budgetary Oversight, 2020–2023
    - Margaret Hourigan; m. Tim Ryan, of Newross, County Tipperary
      - Honora Ryan (1816–1887); m. James Foley (1805–1854)
        - Margaret Foley (b. 1837); m. Michael McGrath
          - Joseph McGrath
            - Eileen McGrath; m. Patrick Hourigan (1895–1975), of Ahane (see above[B])
          - Joanna McGrath (1863–1941); m. Patrick Lane (1855–1927), of Parteen, County Clare (uncle of Jimmy Humphreys)
            - Patrick Lane (Royal Army Medical Corps) (1896–1968), physician; served in the Royal Army Medical Corps during World War I, awarded the Military Cross; afterwards worked for Limerick County Council as a physician, tuberculosis officer and school examiner; featured in the permanent exhibition at Limerick Museum
            - Mona Lane (1903–1970); m. James Hourigan (1893–1973), of Annagh (see above[A])
            - Thomas Lane (1900–1955)
              - Patrick "Paddy" Lane (1934–2012), president of the Irish Farmers' Association, 1976–1980; MEP for Munster, 1989–1994; rugby union international for Ireland in 1964
                - Tom "Tommy" Lane, County Clare chairman of the Irish Farmers' Association
      - Margaret Ryan (1819–1909); m. James Humphrys (1805–1899), of Glenstal, County Limerick
        - Tim Humphreys; m. Bridget Lane
          - Jimmy Humphreys, hurler
        - David Humphreys (1861–1903); m. Nell Rahilly (sister of The O'Rahilly)
          - Dick Humphreys (1896–1968)
          - Sheila Humphreys; m. Patrick O'Donoghue
            - Cróine Magan (née O'Donoghue)
              - Manchán Magan (b. 1970), musician, broadcaster, writer and advocate for the rights of Irish Travellers; presenter on Raidió na Gaeltachta and several RTÉ programmes; multiple IMRO award winner; cultural commentator on the history and music of the Irish Travellers
              - Ruán Magan (b. 1968), director, producer, writer and creator
