= Niamh Hourigan =

Irish sociologist and academic administrator

Professor Niamh Hourigan
- Born: Limerick, Ireland
- Occupations: Sociologist; academic administrator; author
- Employer: Mary Immaculate College
- Title: Vice-President for Academic Affairs, Mary Immaculate College
- Political party: Labour Party
- Parent: Michael Hourigan (father)
- Relatives: Neasa Hourigan (sister); Richard Hourigan, Patrick Hourigan (cousins)

Niamh Hourigan is an Irish sociologist, academic administrator and political candidate. She is vice-president for Academic Affairs at Mary Immaculate College (MIC) in Limerick, and previously served as head of the Department of Sociology and Criminology at University College Cork (UCC), where she spent most of her academic career. A specialist in political culture, corruption, minority-language media and social exclusion, she is the author or editor of several books, including Rule-Breakers: Why 'Being There' Trumps 'Being Fair' in Ireland (2015). In 2024, she was the Labour Party candidate for the Ireland South constituency at that year's European Parliament election, but was not elected.

== Early life ==
Hourigan was born and raised in Limerick city, where she lived on the North Circular Road. She is a daughter of Michael Hourigan, a former Fine Gael member of Limerick City Council and a former Mayor of Limerick, and a sister of Neasa Hourigan, who served as a Green Party Teachta Dála for Dublin Central from 2020 to 2024.

Hourigan worked as a journalist and radio presenter while completing her PhD in sociology, which examined campaigns for indigenous minority-language television services in Europe, comparing the campaigns that led to the establishment of Raidió na Gaeltachta and Teilifís na Gaeilge (now TG4) with equivalent movements among the Welsh, Basque and Scottish Gaelic communities. Her thesis was highly commended in the European Union Committee of the Regions' doctoral thesis prize competition.

== Academic career ==
Niamh Hourigan began her academic career at St Angela's College of Education in Sligo, where for four years she was part of the team that established a joint Bachelor of Arts in Economic and Social Studies with the National University of Ireland, Galway (now the University of Galway), serving as the new programme's course director.

Niamh subsequently moved to University College Cork, where she spent most of her career in the Department of Sociology, rising from college lecturer to senior lecturer. At UCC she served for six years as director of Graduate Studies in Sociology before becoming head of the Department of Sociology and Criminology, a post she held for three years. She has also held an academic appointment at the University of Limerick. Over a twenty-year career in Irish higher education by 2018, she had worked for four different Irish universities and colleges.

In November 2018, Niamh Hourigan was announced as the incoming vice-president for Academic Affairs at Mary Immaculate College in Limerick, taking up the post in March 2019. In the role she is responsible for the college's student academic administration, student life, teaching and learning, and equality, diversity, inclusion and interculturalism functions, and for maintaining the intellectual quality of its teaching and research.

In March 2025, she took part in the launch of a new Department of Business and Accounting at MIC's Thurles campus, and in April 2026 she oversaw the launch of a new MIC "Certificate in Leading Gaelic Games in Primary Schools and Communities", developed with Munster GAA and Limerick GAA.

=== Research ===
Niamh Hourigan's published research spans value change and political culture in Ireland, corruption, organised crime and community violence, minority-language media and protest movements, education transitions for minority communities, and, more recently, the sociological impact of debt, austerity and populism on the Irish middle class. In 2010 she co-authored, with Dr Maria Campbell, The TEACH Report (Traveller Education and Adults: Crisis, Challenge and Change), which examined the challenges facing young Mincéirs (Irish Travellers) in the Irish education system. In 2011 she received the UCC College of Arts, Celtic Studies and Social Sciences Special Research Commendation Award for her ethnographic research on organised crime and community violence in Ireland. She has served as editor of the Irish Journal of Sociology and chaired the editorial committee of Cork University Press, and has led research projects funded by Irish Aid, Universities Ireland and the Irish Research Council.

=== Public and voluntary roles ===
Niamh Hourigan has served on a number of Irish public bodies. She was a board member of the Central Applications Office (CAO) from 2019 to 2023 and of The Teaching Council from 2022 to 2026, and was a member of the Department of Justice's Review Group of Civil Legal Aid (2023–2025), chaired by former Chief Justice Frank Clarke. As of 2026 she is a member of the board of Threshold, the national homelessness prevention charity, and of the Institute of Directors. She has worked with organisations including the Health Service Executive (HSE), the Garda Research Unit, the Irish Probation Service, the Simon Community and Barnardos, and served for three years as co-chair of the Limerick Food Partnership, the regional umbrella group for food-poverty prevention organisations in the Mid-West.

=== Media commentary ===
Hourigan has previously contributed to Irish print and broadcast media on sociological and political themes, writing as a columnist for the Irish Independent, The Irish Times and the Irish Examiner, and appearing as a commentator on programmes including The Right Hook, Tonight with Vincent Browne, Morning Ireland, Today with Pat Kenny and Prime Time. She has also appeared as an election-night analyst for RTÉ News.

== Publications ==
Niamh Hourigan's sole-authored monographs are Escaping the Global Village: Media, Language and Protest (Lexington Books, 2003/2004) and Rule-Breakers: Why 'Being There' Trumps 'Being Fair' in Ireland (Gill & Macmillan, 2015). She has also edited or co-edited Social Movements and Ireland (with Linda Connolly, Manchester University Press, 2006), Minority Language Media: Concepts, Critiques and Case Studies (with Mike Cormack, Multilingual Matters, 2007), and Understanding Limerick: Social Exclusion and Change (Cork University Press, 2011).

Rule-Breakers (2015) argues that Irish public life has historically been shaped by a persistent tension between formal rules and informal relationships, a pattern Hourigan traces to Ireland's colonial history and the retreat of Irish communities into family- and kinship-based networks during that period. Reviewing the book in The Irish Times, Colin Murphy described it as tracing "the recurrent conflict between rules and relationships" in Irish society and its role in fostering corruption and "groupthink" among Irish elites, including in the lead-up to the 2008 Irish financial crisis, and wrote that the book allowed readers "to root this corruption in a wider cultural malaise, without excusing those responsible".

=== Selected bibliography ===
- Hourigan, Niamh (2001). A Comparison of the Campaigns for Raidió na Gaeltachta and Teilifís na Gaeilge. Irish Sociological Research Monographs.
- Hourigan, Niamh (2003/2004). Escaping the Global Village: Media, Language and Protest. Lanham, Maryland: Lexington Books. ISBN 978-0-7391-0927-4.
- Connolly, Linda; Hourigan, Niamh, eds. (2006). Social Movements and Ireland. Manchester: Manchester University Press.
- Cormack, Mike; Hourigan, Niamh, eds. (2007). Minority Language Media: Concepts, Critiques and Case Studies. Clevedon: Multilingual Matters. ISBN 978-1-85359-963-7.
- Campbell, Maria; Hourigan, Niamh (2010). The TEACH Report: Traveller Education and Adults – Crisis, Challenge and Change.
- Hourigan, Niamh, ed. (2011). Understanding Limerick: Social Exclusion and Change. Cork: Cork University Press.
- Hourigan, Niamh (2015). Rule-Breakers: Why 'Being There' Trumps 'Being Fair' in Ireland. Dublin: Gill & Macmillan. ISBN 978-0-7171-6620-6.

== Political career ==
=== 2024 European Parliament election ===
In February 2024, Niamh Hourigan was selected as the Labour Party candidate for Ireland South at a selection convention in the Metropole Hotel, Cork. She was Labour's second European election candidate after Aodhán Ó Ríordáin in Dublin. Labour leader Ivana Bacik said Hourigan had "a long and proud track record of standing up for social and economic equality", while Hourigan said she intended to be "the Labour voice in Europe" and would join the Progressive Alliance of Socialists and Democrats if elected. She also said she would resign her position at Mary Immaculate College if elected.

Her campaign priorities were a "Just Transition" to a greener economy, a European affordable housing plan, and protecting Irish neutrality. In March, she said that after 25 years researching Irish political culture, "rather than standing on the sidelines shouting at people, it's time to get into the arena". She called for the Common Agricultural Policy to be streamlined, arguing that excessive bureaucracy was harming small and medium-sized farmers without requiring weaker climate measures. She launched her campaign in Limerick on 9 April, alongside former Education Minister Jan O'Sullivan and former Labour leader Alan Kelly. Both stressed the need for Mid-West representation in Ireland South and for Irish representation in the Progressive Alliance of Socialists and Democrats.

In May, Hourigan opposed proposed changes to Ireland's "triple lock", describing them as a move towards "Irish neutrality in name only", and called for an "immediate freeze" on the plans. She also called for an EU-wide ceasefire in the Gaza war.

At the election on 7 June, Hourigan received 21,272 first-preference votes, approximately 3% of the valid poll. She was eliminated and not elected; the five seats were won by Seán Kelly, Billy Kelleher, independent Michael McNamara, Cynthia Ní Mhurchú, and Kathleen Funchion.

== Personal life ==
Hourigan is married to Seamus, who is from Nenagh, County Tipperary, and the couple have two children. As of 2024 she lived in Limerick city.

Notable family members
- John Hourigan (early 18th century), of The Hill, Knocknagorteeny and Annagh, County Limerick
  - John "Jack" Hourigan (b. c. 1760), of Annagh
    - John "Jack" Hourigan, of Annagh; m. Mary O'Brien
      - John Hourigan (1819–1883), of Annagh; m. Catherine Ryan
        - Patrick Hourigan (1849–1888), of The Hill; m. Mary Ryan
          - Mary Hourigan (b. 1884); m. Robert Paul Gill (1863–1928), brother of T. P. Gill, MP
            - Tomás Mac Giolla (born Thomas Gill, 1924–2010), TD; president of Sinn Féin and later leader of the Workers' Party; Lord Mayor of Dublin, 1993–1994
        - Richard "Rick" Hourigan (1856–1923), of Ahane; m. Margaret Smyth
          - James Hourigan (1893–1973), of Annagh; m. Mona Lane (1903–1970) (see below[B1])
            - Senator Richard Hourigan (1939–2002), farmer; Fine Gael member of Seanad Éireann for the agricultural panel, 1982–1987 and 1989–1993; m. Nora Humphreys
            - Councillor Patrick "Paddy" Hourigan, Cathaoirleach (chairman) of Limerick County Council, 1993–1994, and councillor from 1972 to 2004 (Castleconnell electoral area); m. Anne
          - Patrick Hourigan (1895–1975), of Ahane; m. Eileen McGrath (see below[B2])
            - Michael Hourigan, Fine Gael member of Limerick City Council; twice mayor of Limerick; m. Patricia Murphy
              - Niamh Hourigan, sociologist; vice-president for academic affairs at Mary Immaculate College, Limerick; Labour Party candidate for the European Parliament in 2024 (Ireland South constituency)
              - Neasa Hourigan (b. 1980), Green Party TD for Dublin Central, 2020–2024; chair of the Committee on Budgetary Oversight, 2020–2023
    - Margaret Hourigan; m. Tim Ryan, of Newross, County Tipperary
      - Honora Ryan (1816–1887); m. James Foley (1805–1854)
        - Margaret Foley (b. 1837); m. Michael McGrath
          - Joseph McGrath
            - Eileen McGrath; m. Patrick Hourigan (1895–1975), of Ahane (see above[B2])
          - Joanna McGrath (1863–1941); m. Patrick Lane (1855–1927), of Parteen, County Clare (uncle of Jimmy Humphreys)
            - Patrick Lane (Royal Army Medical Corps) (1896–1968), physician; served in the Royal Army Medical Corps during World War I, awarded the Military Cross; afterwards worked for Limerick County Council as a physician, tuberculosis officer and school examiner; featured in the permanent exhibition at Limerick Museum
            - Mona Lane (1903–1970); m. James Hourigan (1893–1973), of Annagh (see above[B1])
            - Thomas Lane (1900–1955)
              - Patrick "Paddy" Lane (1934–2012), president of the Irish Farmers' Association, 1976–1980; MEP for Munster, 1989–1994; rugby union international for Ireland in 1964
                - Tom "Tommy" Lane, County Clare chairman of the Irish Farmers' Association
      - Margaret Ryan (1819–1909); m. James Humphrys (1805–1899), of Glenstal, County Limerick
        - Tim Humphreys; m. Bridget Lane
          - Jimmy Humphreys, hurler
        - David Humphreys (1861–1903); m. Nell Rahilly (sister of The O'Rahilly)
          - Dick Humphreys (1896–1968)
          - Sheila Humphreys; m. Patrick O'Donoghue
            - Cróine Magan (née O'Donoghue)
              - Manchán Magan (b. 1970), musician, broadcaster, writer and advocate for the rights of Irish Travellers; presenter on Raidió na Gaeltachta and several RTÉ programmes; multiple IMRO award winner; cultural commentator on the history and music of the Irish Travellers
              - Ruán Magan (b. 1968), director, producer, writer and creator
