= Ruán Magan =

Irish film director

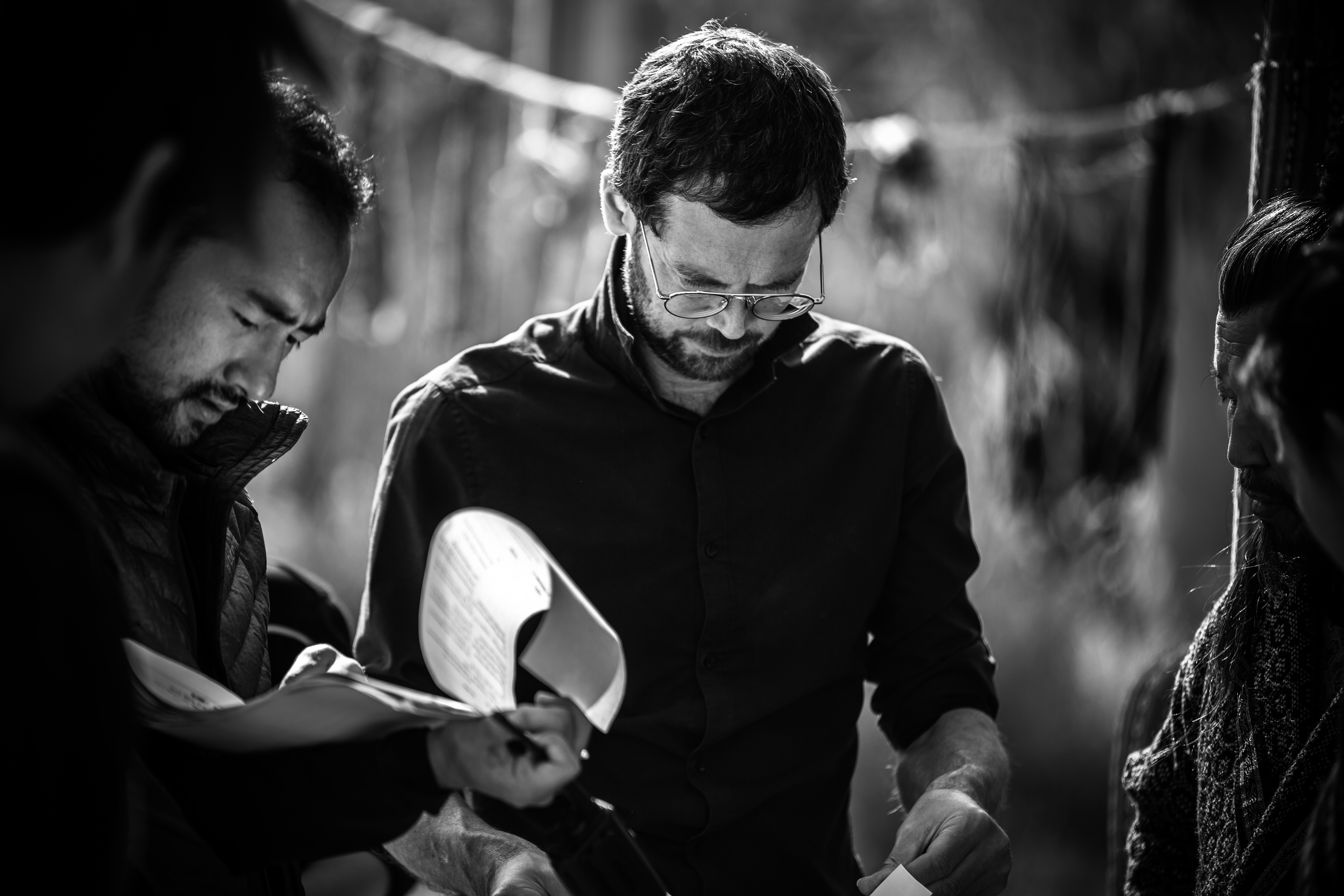
- Born: 1968 (age 57–58); Dublin, Ireland
- Education: Gonzaga College; University College Dublin
- Occupations: Director; Writer; Producer
- Website: https://www.ruanmagan.com/

Ruán Magan (born 1968) is an Irish director, producer, writer and creator whose work in drama, documentary, theatre and major stadium events has been recognised with over 40 international industry awards and has reached audiences of millions around the world.

Projects include Dunhuang – Mysteries of the Sands (IFA/Tencent), Pearl Harbor – The Heroes Who Fought Back (Discovery), 1916 – The Irish Rebellion (RTE, APT), The World Meeting of Families Concert hosted for Pope Francis and The Men Who Built America (History Channel).

== Early life ==
Born in Dublin, Magan was raised in a traditionally nationalist family closely associated with the foundation of the Irish State, as the grandson of Sighle Humphreys and great-grandnephew of The O'Rahilly. As a boy, he was educated at Gonzaga College. He then studied History of Art and Archaeology in University College Dublin (1988–89) but did not complete his degree. He began his career in the film business, working as an assistant director and location manager on Far and Away, 3 Joes, The Devil's Own, Bogwoman and Michael Collins.

Notable family members
- John Hourigan (early 18th century), of The Hill, Knocknagorteeny and Annagh, County Limerick
  - John "Jack" Hourigan (b. c. 1760), of Annagh
    - John "Jack" Hourigan, of Annagh; m. Mary O'Brien
      - John Hourigan (1819–1883), of Annagh; m. Catherine Ryan
        - Patrick Hourigan (1849–1888), of The Hill; m. Mary Ryan
          - Mary Hourigan (b. 1884); m. Robert Paul Gill (1863–1928), brother of T. P. Gill, MP
            - Tomás Mac Giolla (born Thomas Gill, 1924–2010), TD; president of Sinn Féin and later leader of the Workers' Party; Lord Mayor of Dublin, 1993–1994
        - Richard "Rick" Hourigan (1856–1923), of Ahane; m. Margaret Smyth
          - James Hourigan (1893–1973), of Annagh; m. Mona Lane (1903–1970) (see below[B1])
            - Senator Richard Hourigan (1939–2002), farmer; Fine Gael member of Seanad Éireann for the agricultural panel, 1982–1987 and 1989–1993; m. Nora Humphreys
            - Councillor Patrick "Paddy" Hourigan, Cathaoirleach (chairman) of Limerick County Council, 1993–1994, and councillor from 1972 to 2004 (Castleconnell electoral area); m. Anne
          - Patrick Hourigan (1895–1975), of Ahane; m. Eileen McGrath (see below[B2])
            - Michael Hourigan, Fine Gael member of Limerick City Council; twice mayor of Limerick; m. Patricia Murphy
              - Niamh Hourigan, sociologist; vice-president for academic affairs at Mary Immaculate College, Limerick; Labour Party candidate for the European Parliament in 2024 (Ireland South constituency)
              - Neasa Hourigan (b. 1980), Green Party TD for Dublin Central, 2020–2024; chair of the Committee on Budgetary Oversight, 2020–2023
    - Margaret Hourigan; m. Tim Ryan, of Newross, County Tipperary
      - Honora Ryan (1816–1887); m. James Foley (1805–1854)
        - Margaret Foley (b. 1837); m. Michael McGrath
          - Joseph McGrath
            - Eileen McGrath; m. Patrick Hourigan (1895–1975), of Ahane (see above[B2])
          - Joanna McGrath (1863–1941); m. Patrick Lane (1855–1927), of Parteen, County Clare (uncle of Jimmy Humphreys)
            - Patrick Lane (Royal Army Medical Corps) (1896–1968), physician; served in the Royal Army Medical Corps during World War I, awarded the Military Cross; afterwards worked for Limerick County Council as a physician, tuberculosis officer and school examiner; featured in the permanent exhibition at Limerick Museum
            - Mona Lane (1903–1970); m. James Hourigan (1893–1973), of Annagh (see above[B1])
            - Thomas Lane (1900–1955)
              - Patrick "Paddy" Lane (1934–2012), president of the Irish Farmers' Association, 1976–1980; MEP for Munster, 1989–1994; rugby union international for Ireland in 1964
                - Tom "Tommy" Lane, County Clare chairman of the Irish Farmers' Association
      - Margaret Ryan (1819–1909); m. James Humphrys (1805–1899), of Glenstal, County Limerick
        - Tim Humphreys; m. Bridget Lane
          - Jimmy Humphreys, hurler
        - David Humphreys (1861–1903); m. Nell Rahilly (sister of The O'Rahilly)
          - Dick Humphreys (1896–1968)
          - Sheila Humphreys; m. Patrick O'Donoghue
            - Cróine Magan (née O'Donoghue)
              - Manchán Magan (b. 1970), musician, broadcaster, writer and advocate for the rights of Irish Travellers; presenter on Raidió na Gaeltachta and several RTÉ programmes; multiple IMRO award winner; cultural commentator on the history and music of the Irish Travellers
              - Ruán Magan (b. 1968), director, producer, writer and creator

== Career ==
=== Television ===
Magan directed and filmed his first documentary in 1996 featuring his brother, the writer Manchán Magan, beginning a long collaboration during which the brothers made over 60 documentaries filmed across the planet. The series covered themes of human history, philosophy, progress and life and compared the human experience of cultures and people the world over. The brothers received the golden award for services to the Irish language from the Directors Guild for their work.

He produced work in the United States including the Emmy-winning series The Men Who Built America, telling the story of Vanderbilt, Carnegie, and their fellow "robber-barons," Pearl Harbor - The Heroes Who Fought Back, Sacred Sites, a series exploring the mysteries of the ancient world and The Ghosts of Duffy’s Cut, a film that examines the mysterious deaths of 57 railway workers in the 1850s. In 2003, he filmed the story of Riverdance's first performance in China's Great Hall of the People.

As producer and editor, Magan has collaborated widely including with human rights activist, Deeyah Khan, as she worked for seven years producing her documentary film, Banaz - A Love Story and with Mark McLoughlin in the making of Blood Rising and Outsider.

He created documentary projects exploring Irish history. Among these, On God's Mission, Lifers and The Nazarene examine the experience and effects of Irish missionaries and NGOs in Africa, South America, and Asia. He directed the drama-documentaries Waterloo's Warriors and Death or Canada which explore the participation of Irish soldiers in the Battle of Waterloo and the experience of migrants fleeing the famine for Canada during the Great Famine 1847. He collaborated with broadcaster Gay Byrne making two documentaries, My Father’s War revealing the terrible experiences of Irish soldiers during World War I and Last Orders, which charts the rise and fall of the Irish Christian Brothers and the effects of child abuse scandals in Ireland.

Magan has written and directed two documentary series and feature-length documentaries examining Ireland's struggle for independence from 1913 to 1923. Both 1916 – The Irish Rebellion and The Irish Revolution. 1916 – The Irish Rebellion reached audiences of over 40 million people around the world.

Magan wrote, produced and directed the acclaimed and multi-award-winning documentary feature, The Hunger, narrated by Liam Neeson, and produced in collaboration with University College Cork. It tells the heartrending story of the great famine of the 1840s, which caused the deaths of 100,000 people in Europe and over a million people in Ireland and the emigration of 2 million people to the US, Canada, Britain and Australia between 1845 and 1855. The Hunger has aired coast to coast in America on PBS, in Ireland on RTÉ, across Europe on ARTE and in China on XiGua.

Steps of Freedom, a major dance and entertainment documentary film, released in 2021, tells the extraordinary story of how Irish dance rose from being the traditional dance of the people to become a global phenomenon that has reached audiences across the world.

=== Drama ===
In 2019, Magan collaborated with Tencent and IFA Media Beijing as writer and director of Dunhuang - Edge of the World, a 5 part series that tells the 1000-year history of the Silk Road frontier post, Dunhuang. Nominated for the Asian Academy Awards and featuring an all star cast, the series reached audiences of 50 million per episode on Tencent.

Magan directed the pilot episode for the long-running true crime investigation Discovery series Redrum. The series avoids traditional mystery programming by starting the stories at the scene of the crimes and working backward to reveal the killers.

In 2016, Magan directed the award-winning comedy-drama series, Wrecking the Rising, starring Peter Coonan and Eoin McDonnell. This irreverent comedy series charting the adventures of feckless time-travelling amateur historians has been selected by the Irish Department of Education to be part of the Irish secondary school curriculum.

Magan directed the Irish-language film, Éoinín na nÉan (2015) and the multi-award-winning short film, Angel. He has written several screenplays including The Noticer (2015), No Fury (2019) and, with writer Mark Doherty, The Trouble with Charlie (2019).

Magan is set to produce Devil In The Feet, a cinema-documentary revealing the origins of Irish dance, due for international release in 2021.

=== Theatre and stadium events ===
Collaborating with Professor Chris Fitzpatrick, Magan wrote and directed the experimental play, And Spring Shall Come.

In 2018, Magan was Creative Director of the World Meeting of Families, a music, song, and dance show held in Croke Park in Dublin to celebrate the visit of Pope Francis to Ireland featuring Andrea Bocelli, Shaun Davey, and a choir of a thousand. The event featured 1,500 performers and played to a record-breaking full house and television audiences around the world.

He fulfilled a similar role, as Creative Director of the Gaelic Athletic Association's 1916 Commemoration show, Laochra.

In recent years, he has made a series of short films in collaboration with Irish state bodies and the Department of the Taoiseach. They include This Is Ireland, Here We Live, and Ireland’s campaign video for a UN Security Council seat.

== Selected awards and honours ==
- Delhi International Film Festival (2020) for The Irish Revolution
- Prix Europa (2019) for The Irish Revolution
- Accolade Award (2018) for Sacred Sites
- Programming Excellence Award, American Public TV (2016) for 1916 – The Irish Rebellion
- Silver Sabre, World Military Film Festival (2016) for 1916 – The Irish Rebellion
- Irish Film and Television Academy Award (2016) for 1916 – The Irish Rebellion
- New York Film festival, Gold Award, World Media Festival (2015) for Waterloo’s Warriors
- World Religious Film Festival (2014) for Lifers
- Radharc Award (2014) for Lifers
- Outstanding Contribution Award from the Screen Directors Guild of Ireland (2013)
- Emmy Nomination Best Documentary (2013) for The Men Who Built America
- Irish Film and Television Academy Award (2013) for The Radharc Squad
- Milan International Film Festival (2013) for Angel
- Best Drama, Fastnet Film Festival (2012) for Angel
- Overall Winner, Fastnet Film Festival (2012) for Angel
- Gemini Awards (2010) for Death or Canada
- Irish Film and Television Academy Award (2007) for The Pope's Children

== See also ==
- Manchán Magan
