= Beef Plan Movement =

- Type: Farming lobby group
- Location: Ireland
- Chairperson: Eamon Corley (as of 2023)
- Website: beefplan.ie

Beef Plan Movement is a farmers' group which campaigns for beef farmers in Ireland. In late 2019, members of the group blocked several meat processing plants due to a dispute about how much farmers were paid. As of 2022, the Beef Plan Movement had approximately 2500 members.

== Formation and split ==
The first public meeting of the "Beef Plan 2018-2025 Group" was held in November 2018, and by December 2018 the "recently-formed movement" was close to being established as distinct legal entity. The organisation formed as a registered company by early 2019.

Following reports of internal issues in 2020, the organisation reportedly had a "structural change" at directorship level in early 2021, and one group of members subsequently voted to "rebrand" as the "Irish Beef and Lamb Association". This "splintering into two factions" during May 2021, involved "one side of the Beef Plan Movement" rebranding as a new organisation called the Irish Beef and Lamb Association (IBLA) "to avoid confusion [..and..] reflect an increase in scope".

== See also ==
- Irish Farmers' Association (a separate unaffiliated organisation)
