= John Nassau Greene =

Irish politician (1890–1973)

Senator
- In office 27 April 1938 – 7 September 1938
- Constituency: Agricultural Panel

Personal details
- Born: 8 March 1890 County Kildare, Ireland
- Died: 11 February 1973 (aged 82) Dublin, Ireland
- Party: Independent; Farmers' Party
- Spouse: Anne Kathleen Jackson (m. 1911)
- Children: 7, including Juan
- Education: Albert Agricultural College

John Nassau Greene (8 March 1890 – 11 February 1973) was an Irish politician and farmer.

From Athy, he came from one of the wealthiest farming families in Ireland. The Greenes had been in Ireland since the mid seventeenth century, when a Capt. Godfrey Greene (d. 1682), a '49 officer', acquired Moorestown castle, County Tipperary, and lands at Old Abbey, County Limerick. Greene, was the third generation of the family resident at Kilkea lodge, Athy, and lived for a time in Argentina in the 1870s, where several of his paternal uncles had emigrated.

One of the biggest farmers in County Kildare, in 1926 Greene was a founding member and chairman of the Beet Growers' Association.

He was elected to Kildare County Council at the 1925 local elections, standing for the Farmers' Party in the Athy local electoral area.

He was an independent member of Seanad Éireann from April to August 1938. He was elected to the 2nd Seanad in April 1938 to the Agricultural Panel. He did not contest the August 1938 Seanad election.

In January 1955, one of his sons, Juan Greene, became the first president of the National Farmers' Association, later known as the Irish Farmers' Association.
