= Juan Greene =

Irish farmer (1918–1979)

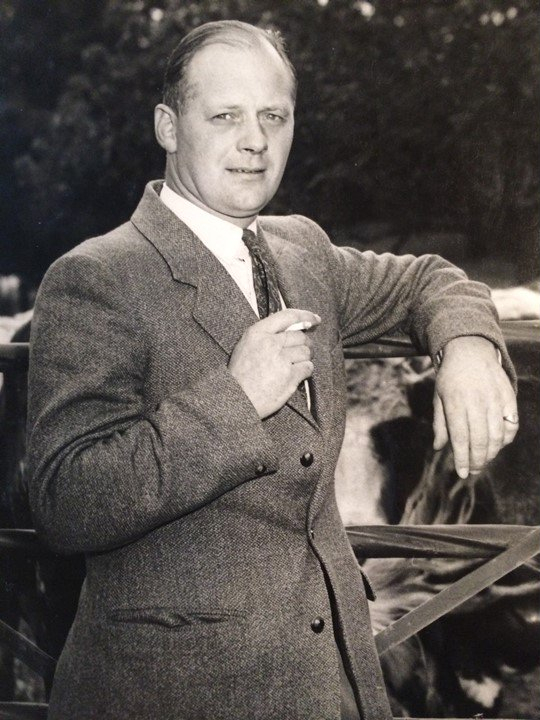
- Greene, c. 1940s

Personal details
- Born: 19 September 1918 Argentina
- Died: 9 November 1979 (aged 61) Dublin, Ireland
- Spouse: Juliet Woodford Causer (m. 1948)
- Children: 3
- Parent: John Nassau Greene (father)
- Education: Trinity College Dublin

Military service
- Allegiance: United Kingdom
- Branch/service: Royal Air Force
- Years of service: 1941–1945

Juan Nassau Greene (19 September 1918 – 9 November 1979) was an Irish farmer and medical doctor.

== Early life ==
He was the son of John Nassau Greene and Anne Kathleen Jackson, and came from one of the wealthiest farming families in Ireland. The Greenes had been in Ireland since the mid seventeenth century, when a Capt. Godfrey Greene (d. 1682), a '49 officer', acquired Moorestown castle, County Tipperary, and lands at Old Abbey, County Limerick. Juan's father, John Greene, was the third generation of the family resident at Kilkea lodge, Athy, and lived for a time in Argentina in the 1870s, where several of his paternal uncles had emigrated, and where Juan was born.

Greene was educated at St Columba's College, Dublin, then studied medicine at Trinity College Dublin, graduating in 1941. After practising for six months in Harrogate, Yorkshire, he enlisted in the Royal Air Force, serving as a medical officer during World War II in Britain, Burma, and India. After the war, he returned to civilian practice and worked in Sir Patrick Dun's Hospital, Dublin, but retired from medicine in 1948 to concentrate exclusively on farming.

== Career ==
Greene played a central role in the establishment of organised farming representation in Ireland. Following his father's footsteps in agricultural associations, he was instrumental in founding the National Farmers' Association (NFA) (later known as the Irish Farmers' Association) in 1955, having broken a critical deadlock at a meeting in Thurles in August 1954 by proposing a new body that would operate alongside existing associations rather than replace them. He was unanimously elected the NFA's first president, a position he held until 1962, and within three months of the association's founding had overseen the formation of some 450 local branches with 12,000 members.

During his tenure, Greene worked to position the NFA as the primary voice of Irish farming, pursuing goals that extended beyond price negotiations to encompass agricultural policy, production methods, and marketing reform. He chaired the Advisory Committee on the Marketing of Agricultural Produce (1957–1959), whose reports led to the establishment of An Bord Bainne and the reconstitution of the Pigs and Bacon Commission. He was also active internationally through the International Federation of Agricultural Producers, where he twice chaired the policy committee and pioneered the idea of using agricultural surpluses to address hunger in developing countries. He favoured a conciliatory and low-key leadership style, and after he retired from the NFA, he served on numerous government commissions and the boards of several companies and financial institutions, including the Bank of Ireland and the Central Bank of Ireland.

== Personal life ==
He married Juliet Woodford Causer in 1948, and they had three children.

He died in the Richmond Surgical Hospital, Dublin, on 9 November 1979, aged 61, and was buried in Kilkea cemetery.
