= Owneybeg =

Barony in County Limerick, Ireland

Owneybeg Uaithne Beag (Irish)
- Barony
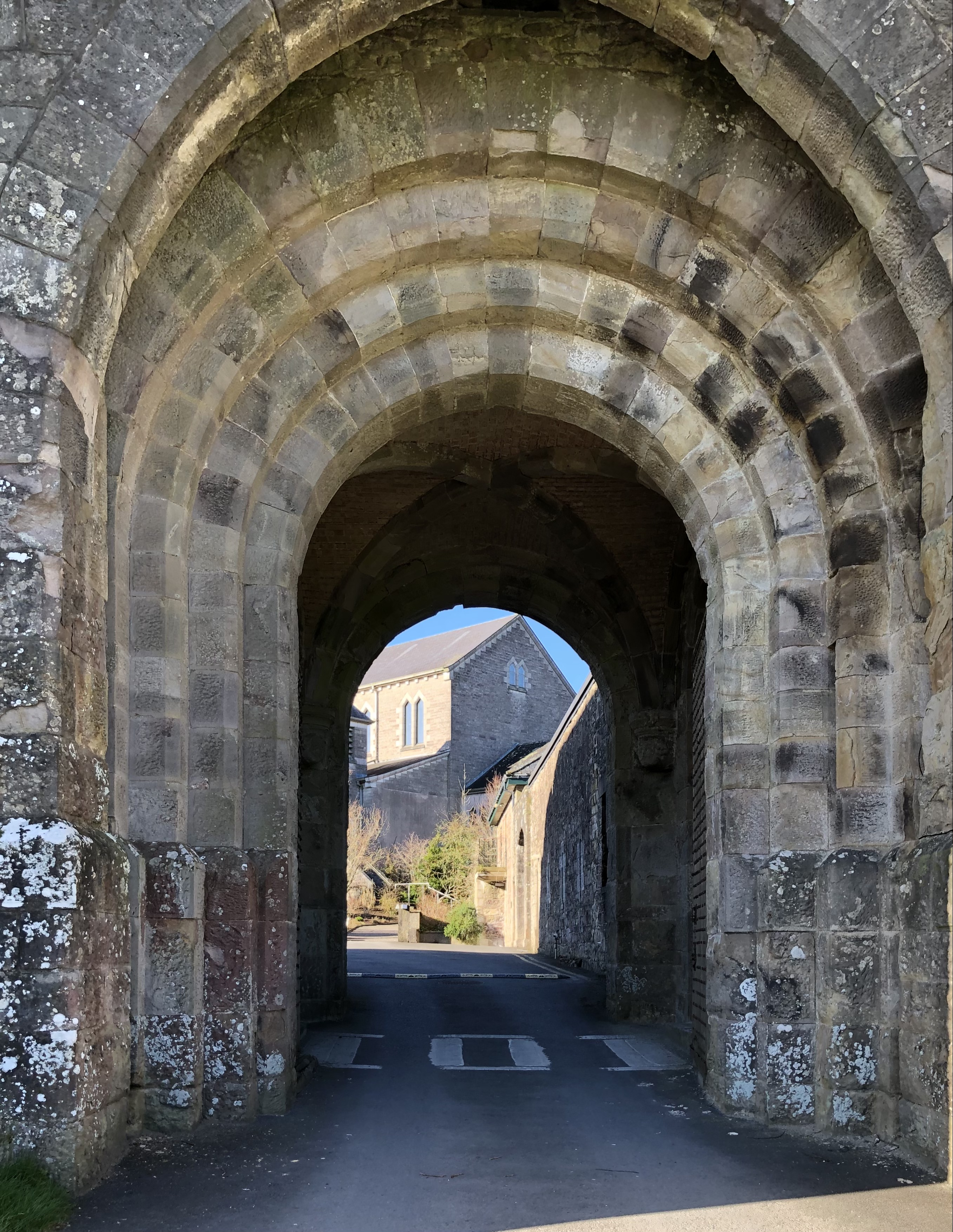
- Entrance to Glenstal Abbey

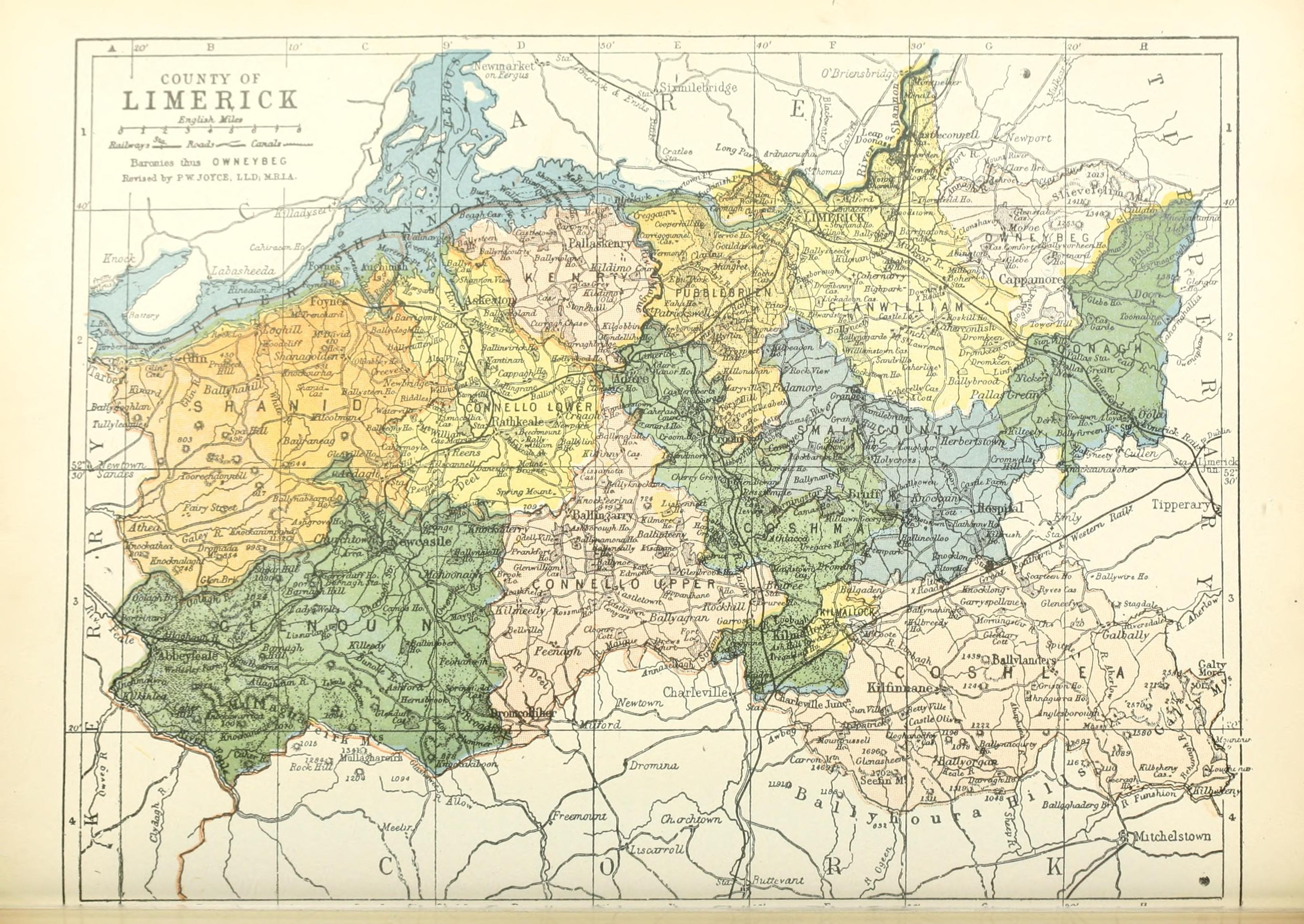
- Barony map of County Limerick, 1900; Owneybeg is in the northeast, coloured pink.

- Location within Ireland
- Coordinates: 52°38′N 8°22′W
- Sovereign state: Ireland
- Province: Munster
- County: Limerick

Area
  - Total: 110.1 km^{2} (42.5 sq mi)

Owneybeg (Irish: Uaithne Beag, occasionally spelled Owenybeg) is a historical barony in northeast County Limerick, Ireland.

Baronies were mainly cadastral rather than administrative units. They acquired modest local taxation and spending functions in the 19th century before being superseded by the Local Government (Ireland) Act 1898.

== History ==
The Uaithni were a medieval Gaelic Irish tribe in the area. In Ptolemy's 2nd century Geography he mentions the Auteinoi, who lived somewhere around County Galway. They claimed descent from Uaithne, daughter of the legendary king Eochaid mac Luchta.

The Book of Lecan connects Owney to the legendary harper Uaithne, with his sons Uaithnia, Druithnia and Caínnia being the ancestors of the Uaithni, Dál Druithne and Cáenraige.

Modern scholars have tried to reconstruct an etymology, with one suggestion being Aue-ítha-ini ("tribe of the descendants of Íth," a mythological figure whose name means "fat" and is associated with agricultural production.)

Owney was divided into Owneytire ("Uaithni-Land") and Owneybeg ("Lesser Uaithni"). Owneytire comprised land around Newport, County Tipperary, while Owneybeg (also "Uaithne Cliach") was Abington, Cappamore and North Doon.

The region was in the Middle Ages part of part of the territory of Éile Uí Chearbhaill and was later ruled by the Ó Donnagáin (O'Donegans). In 1185 King John, Lord of Ireland granted some of Owneybeg to the Norman knight Theobald Walter, 1st Chief Butler of Ireland. It later came into the possession of the Ó Maoilriain (Mulryans) and they held the area until the Cromwellian conquest of Ireland.

== Geography ==
Owneybeg is in the northeast of the county, containing part of the Slieve Felim Mountains. To its north is the Annagh River and Clare River, which form part of the border with County Tipperary.

== List of settlements ==
Settlements within the historical barony of Owneybeg include:

- Glenstal
- Murroe
- Annagh
- Knocknagorteeny
