= John Donnelly (Irish farmer) =

Irish farmer

John Donnelly is an Irish farmer who was President of the Irish Farmers' Association, 1994–1998.

A native of Abbey, County Galway, Donnelly was born in the townland of Conicare. He was educated at the local national school and for one term at St. Molaisses College, Portumna.

He became a member of Macra na Feirme, winning the All-Ireland Macra na Feirme debating final in 1975. He joined the Irish Farmers' Association in 1977, shortly afterwards becoming Branch Chairman. He served as the county's co-chairman from 1981 to 1984, and as Connacht Vice President from 1984 to 1988.

In 1994 he became the first member from west of the Shannon to become the association's president. He campaigned to have all of County Galway classified as severely disadvantaged, successfully improved the finances of poorer farmers. His term ended in 1998.

Since then, Donnelly has continued involvement in farming and promotes quality assured beef from the south-east area of county Galway. He is also involved with Cancer Care West and works to raise funding for Galway cancer patients.
