= Abington (civil parish) =

Abington Mainistir Uaithne
- Civil parish
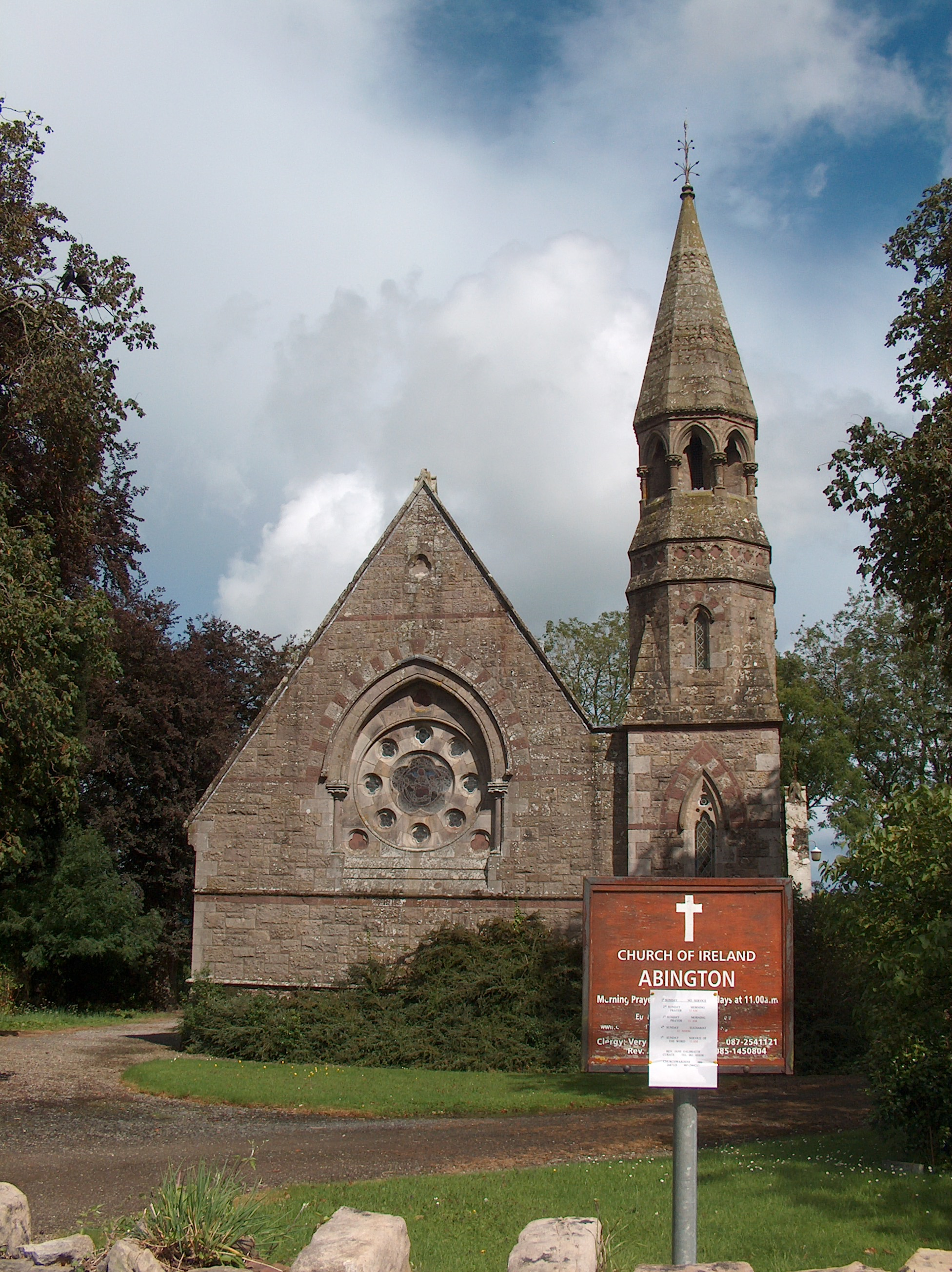
- Abington Church of Ireland

- Location in Ireland
- Coordinates: 52.63244°N 8.41945°W
- Country: Ireland
- Time zone: WET
  - Summer (DST): IST (WEST)

Abington (Irish: Mainistir Uaithne, meaning 'monastery of Uaithne') is a civil parish in Ireland, partly in County Tipperary (in the barony of Owney and Arra) and partly in County Limerick (partly in Limerick city and partly in the baronies of Clanwilliam and Owneybeg).

It was home for a time to the author Sheridan Le Fanu. He stayed in the parish as a child while his father was the rector of the Abington Church of Ireland.

By statute, the parish contains 32,200 acres (13,000 ha), of which 12,290 acres (4,970 ha) are in County Tipperary. Of the 19,280 acres (7,800 ha) in County Limerick, 708 acres (287 ha) are in the liberties of the city of Limerick and the remainder are split between the baronies of Clanwilliam and Owneybeg. The hamlet and townland of Abington is in the County Limerick part of the parish.

== List of towns and townlands ==
Townland	Area (acres)	Barony
Abington	380	Owneybeg
Ahacore	164	Owneybeg
Annagh	859	Owneybeg
Ashroe	802	Owneybeg
Ballyguy	199	Clanwilliam
Ballyvorheen	832	Owneybeg
Boarmanshill	569	Owneybeg
Boher	308	Clanwilliam
Bohergar	280	Clanwilliam
Cappanahanagh	648	Owneybeg
Cappanouk	983	Owneybeg
Cappercullen	358	Owneybeg
Cloghnadromin	554	Clanwilliam
Clonloughna	119	Owneybeg
Clonshavoy	24	Owneybeg
Clooncunna North	220	Clanwilliam
Clooncunna South	29	Clanwilliam
Coolbreedeen	258	Owneybeg
Coolnahila (Palmer)	271	Owneybeg
Coolnahila (Powell)	199	Owneybeg
Dromeliagh	671	Owneybeg
Eyon	542	Clanwilliam
Farnane	431	Owneybeg
Forkeala	1,090	Owneybeg
Garranbane	927	Owneybeg
Gleno	760	Owneybeg
Gleno Knocklatteragh	144	Owneybeg
Gleno Newtown	194	Owneybeg
Glenstal	1,084	Owneybeg
Gortavacoosh	127	Owneybeg
Kishyquirk	288	Clanwilliam
Knockanerry	299	Owneybeg
Knocknagorteeny	439	Owneybeg
Liscreagh	146	Owneybeg
Lismullane	267	Clanwilliam
Maddyboy	84	Clanwilliam
Meentolla	494	Owneybeg
Moher	481	Owneybeg
Mongfune	590	Owneybeg
Moroe	Town	Owneybeg
Moroe	135	Owneybeg
Moroewood	241	Owneybeg
Puckane	224	Owneybeg
Rath	377	Owneybeg
Rathwood	280	Owneybeg
Sandylane	267	Clanwilliam
Toberagarriff	265	Owneybeg
Toorlougher	492	Owneybeg
