= Diarmuid Scully =

Irish politician

Diarmuid Scully (born 25 January 1972) is a former member of Limerick City Council and former Mayor of Limerick. He was a member of the Fine Gael party, but has retired from active politics.

Born in Limerick, Diarmuid Scully was educated at St Patrick's Boys National School in the city and later CBS Sexton Street. He graduated from the University of Limerick with a degree in Business Studies. After leaving university, Scully worked for five years as a technical support supervisor with Sykes Enterprises at their offices in Shannon.

In 1999, he was elected to Limerick City Council in Ward 3 of the city for the Fine Gael party, and was re-elected in 2004. In 2005 he became Mayor of Limerick, the youngest person to do so since Thady Coughlan in 1975. During his tenure as Mayor, Scully sought to open up the Council to the young people of Limerick, overseeing the establishment of the Young City Council, and becoming the first Limerick Mayor to produce a regular podcast. Limerick introduced Street Ambassadors during his term as Mayor.

Defeated in the local elections in 2014, he returned to the University of Limerick as a mature student. He has since been awarded a master's degree and a PhD in Politics and Public Administration. He currently lectures in Irish Politics and European Studies.

Diarmuid Scully is married to Ruth (née Keevey) of Bruff, Co. Limerick. They have two sons.

Political offices
Preceded by Michael Hourigan	Mayor of Limerick; 2005–2006	Succeeded by Joe Leddin
