= Nell Humphreys =

Irish revolutionary (1871–1939)

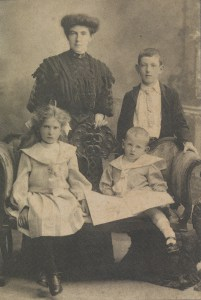
- Nell Humphreys and her children
- Born: Mary Ellen Rahilly; 28 April 1871; Ballylongford, County Kerry, Ireland
- Died: 2 December 1939 (aged 68); Dublin, Ireland
- Organization: Cumann na mBan

Mary Ellen Humphreys (née Rahilly) (28 April 1871 – 2 December 1939) was an Irish revolutionary, Cumann na mBan leader and Dublin city councillor active in the period from 1916 to 1923.

== Early life and family ==
Born in Ballylongford, County Kerry to Richard Rahilly and Ellen Mangan, she was a sister of the 1916 leader The O'Rahilly and the republican activist Anno O'Rahilly. She attended the Ursuline Convent, Waterford. She married David Humphreys, a surgeon, in 1895. Her father-in-law was the farmer and poor law guardian, James Humphrys. They had three children, Richard, Sheila, and Emmett, before David died in 1903. Humphreys and her children moved from Limerick to Dublin to live with her sister. Her father-in-law was the County Limerick Poor Law Guardian, James Humphrys. Richard, known as Dick, joined the Irish Volunteers and was active in Easter Rising. Sheila, known as Sighle, became an active republican through her membership of Cumann na mBan.

== After the Easter Rising ==
Humphreys visited the GPO during the Rising to give the volunteers medals of the Mother of Perpetual Succour. Following the death of Humphrey's brother The O'Rahilly in combat she was arrested and detained in the aftermath of the Easter Rising. On 9 May 1916 and imprisoned in Mountjoy Prison. While detained, she led nightly prayer vigils and took part in a hunger strike. Her daughter claimed that before this her mother was a widow who was "only interested in caring for her family, tending to her garden and saying her prayers." After the death of her brother and the imprisonment of her son, she joined the Ranelagh Branch of Cummann na mBan in 1919 and was elected as a republican member of Pembroke Urban District Council in 1920.

During the Irish War of Independence her home became a centre of Irish Republican activities and was often used as a safe house. During the Civil war she was detained for the period November 1922 to July 1923, and her home was a safe house for Anti-Treaty fugitives such as Ernie O'Malley. Alongside her sister, Humphreys represented her brother at Easter Rising commemorations.

== Death and legacy ==
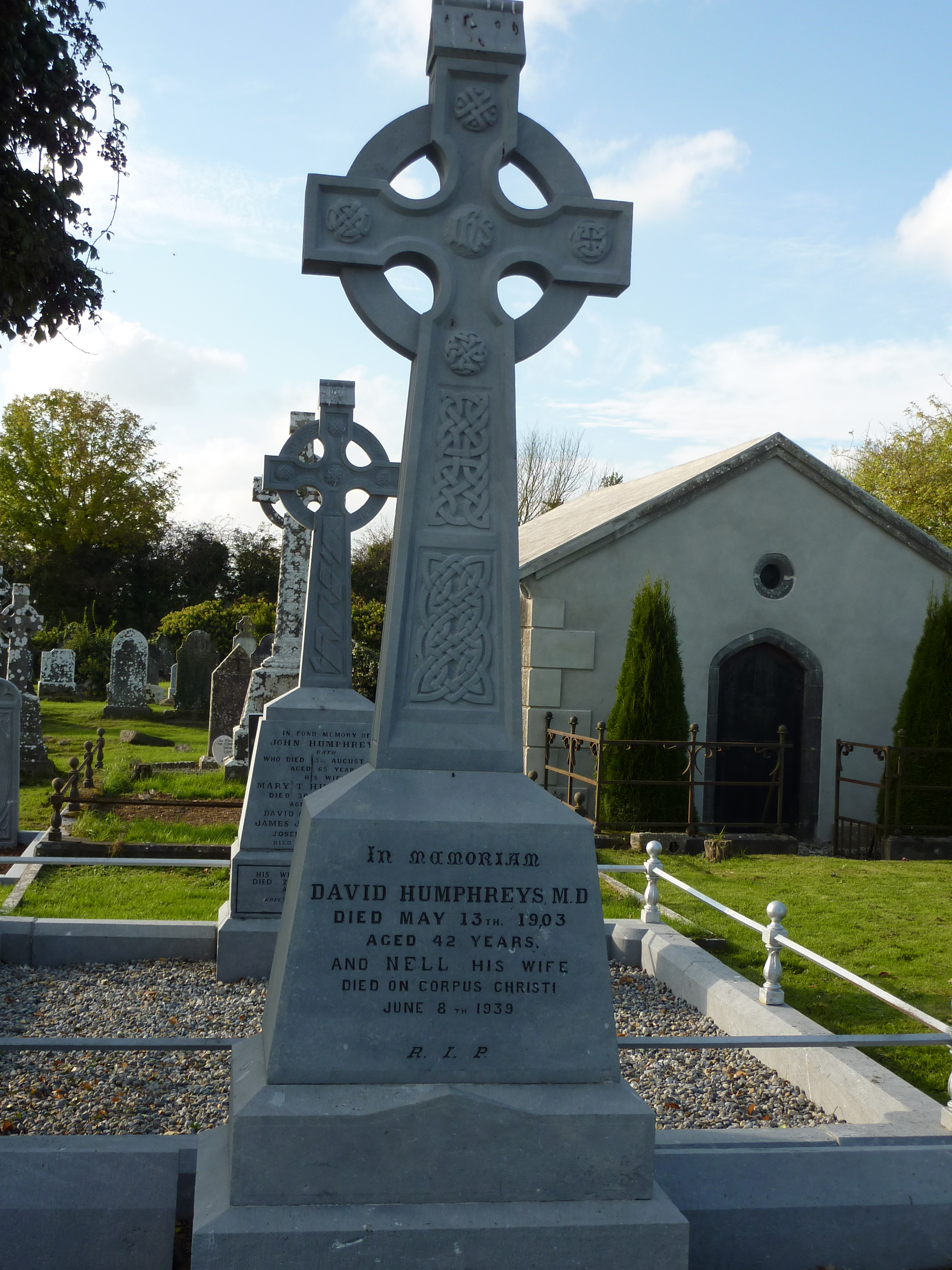
Grave of Nell and David Humphreys

Shortly before her death in 1939 she commissioned a Harry Clarke stained glass window in Mountjoy Prison where she had previously been detained. The window remains in place in the prison chapel.

Humphreys died on 8 June 1939, and is buried with her husband in Abington, Murroe, County Limerick. Through her daughter, Humphreys was the great grandmother of Manchán and Ruán Magan.
