= Michael Hourigan =

Irish politician

Mayor of the Metropolitan District of Limerick
- In office 24 June 2016 – 23 June 2017
- Preceded by: Jerry O'Dea
- Succeeded by: Sean Lynch

Mayor of Limerick
- In office June 2004 – June 2005
- Preceded by: Dick Sadlier
- Succeeded by: Diarmuid Scully

Councillor for Limerick
- In office 1999–2019

Personal details
- Born: County Limerick, Ireland
- Party: Fine Gael
- Spouse: Patricia Murphy
- Children: Neasa, Niamh
- Parents: Patrick Hourigan (1895-1975) (father); Eileen McGrath ( -1996) (mother)

Michael Hourigan is an Irish politician and former Mayor of Limerick. As a member of Fine Gael, he represented Limerick city as a councillor and served as Mayor of the Metropolitan District of Limerick from 2016 to 2017.

== Early life and family ==
Michael Hourigan was born to Patrick Hourigan (1895–1975) and Eileen McGrath (1908–1996) in County Limerick. He was raised in Drominboy where the family lived. He is married to Patricia Murphy. His children include Neasa Hourigan, a former Green Party Teachta Dála (TD), and Niamh Hourigan, a sociologist and Labour Party Member of the European Parliament candidate for Ireland South constituency in the 2024 European Parliament elections. He is also a cousin of Irish MEP Paddy Lane and Senator Richard Hourigan.

== Political career ==
=== Local government ===
Michael Hourigan served as a Fine Gael councillor for Limerick city council. He was a member of Limerick's local authority since his election in 1999 and topped the poll in his ward at the 2004 and 2009 elections. Michael Hourigan held various positions within the council structure, including serving as chairman of the Joint Policing Committee (JPC).

As chairman of the Sporting and Cultural SPC, Hourigan engaged with Limerick's City of Culture programme, participating in discussions about the scope and reach of cultural events across the city and county.

Hourigan was also active on healthcare and hospital procurement issues, raising concerns about tender processes for hospital services. In 2014, he highlighted that the HSE had clocked up a €1.2 million annual bill for taxi services to University Hospital Limerick, questioning whether all taxi firms in the city were given fair opportunity to bid for such work.

=== Mayor of Limerick ===
Hourigan was elected Mayor of Limerick in June 2004 and held the office until June 2005. He was succeeded by Diarmuid Scully.

As mayor, Hourigan welcomed Princess Anne at City Hall, in Limerick on 10 September 2004, for a visit and an official meeting, despite some calls from local republican groups to boycott the visit.

In December 2004, following the killing of Detective Garda Jerry McCabe, Hourigan organised and chaired a special vote from the council, regarding the controversial plan for an early release of the criminals.

=== Mayor of the Metropolitan District of Limerick ===
Hourigan was elected Mayor of the Metropolitan District of Limerick (a newly established entity since 2014, replacing Limerick City Council) on 24 June 2016, securing 11 of 19 votes on the first count. He succeeded Jerry O'Dea and was succeeded in turn by Sean Lynch in June 2017.

Upon his election as mayor, Hourigan identified tourism and improving the commercial life of Limerick city as key priorities, emphasizing the need to maximize the River Shannon's potential to attract both tourists and businesses.

=== Retirement from local politics ===
In July 2018, Hourigan announced that he would retire from local politics at the 2019 local elections. By 2018, he had served two terms as Mayor of Limerick. Hourigan said that, after almost 20 years on the council, he believed it was time to allow a younger candidate to succeed him. He also indicated that he intended to remain involved in politics after leaving the council.

== Bibliography ==
=== Selected press articles ===
Paper sources, accessible in digitized format via Irish Newspaper Archives.

- "Hourigan is Limerick's frontrunner for Mayor". Evening Echo. 21 June 2004. p. 3/91.
- "Cllr Michael Hourigan (FG) elected Mayor of Limerick last night". Irish Independent. 22 June 2004. p. 10/53.
- "Princess Anne at City Hall in Limerick yesterday, where she met the city Mayor Michael Hourigan". Irish Independent. 11 September 2004. p. 3/73.
- "Mayor to tackle IRFU boss on home venue". Limerick Leader. 22 November 2004. p. 5/32.
- "Michael Hourigan: Critical. Freedom move criticised". Irish Examiner. 3 September 2014. p. 4/33.

=== Selected online articles ===
- "Two of Limerick's political big beasts to retire at next summer's local elections". Limerick Leader. 1 July 2018.
- "New mayor for Metropolitan District of Limerick". Limerick Leader. 24 June 2016.
- Nick Rabbitts (23 June 2017). "Limerick's metropolitan mayor 'was able to bring something to communities'". Limerick Leader.
- "Limerick 'must tackle drug use', says councillor". The Journal.ie. 10 May 2012.
- "Michael Hourigan elected as new metropolitan mayor". Live95FM. 24 June 2016.

Political offices
Preceded by Dick Sadlier	Mayor of Limerick; 2004–2005	Succeeded by Diarmuid Scully
Preceded by Jerry O'Dea	Mayor of the Metropolitan District of Limerick; 2016-2017	Succeeded by Seán Lynch
