= Sheila Humphreys =

Irish republican (1899–1994)

- Born: 12 March 1899; County Limerick, Ireland
- Died: 14 March 1994 (aged 95); Harold's Cross, Dublin, Ireland
- Other name: Sighle
- Organization: Cumann na mBan
- Known for: Political activism
- Spouse: Domhnall O'Donoghue

Sheila Humphreys, also known as Sighle Humphreys (12 March 1899 – 14 March 1994), was an Irish republican and member of Cumann na mBan.

== Background ==
Sheila Humphreys, born Margaret Humphreys, lived at 18 The Crescent, Limerick, in a wealthy family and was raised at Quinsborough House, County Clare. She was the only daughter of Dr David Humphreys and Nell Humphreys (née Mary Ellen Rahilly). Her father suffered from tuberculosis and died when she was four years old. Her mother was the sister of Michael Joseph Rahilly, "The O'Rahilly", who was killed during the 1916 Easter Rising. Her two brothers, Emmet and Dick, attended Pearse's St Enda's School and Dick served alongside The O'Rahilly in the GPO in 1916. The family moved to 54 Northumberland Road, Dublin in 1909. Humphreys attended Mount Anville Secondary School, where she was head girl and became a fluent Irish speaker.

=== Political activities ===
She joined Cumann na mBan in 1919, aged 20, an organisation founded in response to the dearth of women at the Sinn Féin Convention of October 1917. She served variously as secretary, director of publicity and national vice-president. She was on the committee of the Irish Volunteer Dependants' Fund after the Rising and engaged in finding safe-houses for those on the run. She was a life long friend of fellow Cumann na mBan leader Maire Comerford. The large family home at 36 Ailesbury Road was used as an IRA safe house throughout the War of Independence and the Dáil cabinet often met there.

Humphreys also spent a year in Paris (1919–20).

The family took the anti-Treaty position during the Civil War and its home was the object of regular raids by Free State forces. The most significant event took place on 4 November 1922 when IRA assistant chief of staff Ernie O'Malley was severely wounded and arrested in a protracted shoot-out with Free State soldiers. At the time, only Humphreys, her mother and aunt were in the house with O'Malley. Humphreys played an active part in resisting the raid, though she always denied reports that she was responsible for shooting a Free State soldier who died in the fighting. She always said that Ernie O'Malley, "a soldier above all", was responsible. The incident is described in detail in O'Malley's memoir of the Civil War, The Singing Flame.

After her arrest following this raid, Humphreys took part in the nationwide 1923 Irish Hunger Strikes. She was placed in solitary confinement before finally being released on 29 November 1923 after a thirty-one day hunger strike.

The Ailsbury Road raid was the subject of a 2003 hour-long docudrama entitled The Struggle. The film was directed and scripted by Humphrey's grandsons Manchán Magan and Ruán Magan and produced by RTÉ.

== Later life ==
Humphreys continued her involvement with Cumann na mBan after the Civil War, contributing significantly to the republican movement throughout the 1920s and 1930s. She became the Cumann representative on the Republican Council in 1929. She was in Mountjoy Jail in 1926, 1927, 1928, and 1931. In 1928, she went on a six-day hunger strike, and was designated as a political prisoner. Despite her affluent background, Humphreys was active in the socialist republican organisation Saor Éire, serving as the group's co-treasurer from 1931. In 1934, she resigned from the Republican Congress, but her Sinn Féin principles were more important, as they had criticised the IRA.

She married Domhnall O'Donoghue (1897–1957), a member of Dublin Brigade IRA. They had two children, Dara and Cróine. Her husband was imprisoned in 1936 for making seditious speeches. She tried to keep the Cumann going following the president's resignation, in 1941, she briefly served as Cumann na mBan's president. She served as President of the St Vincent de Paul Society (1937–1975), and also the Political Prisoners Committee until 1949; although she continued to support the Prisoners Dependants campaigns, necessarily for women (1951–89). Her causes continued to be consistently those of Sinn Féin: anti-EEC, and very strongly Catholic, promoting the Mass on television, all in the Irish language.

== Later years ==
In the 1940s and 50s O'Donoghue became involved with the Irish republican political party Clann na Poblachta on its foundation and stood as a Clann candidate in the 1948 general election. He died in 1957. In the 1970s and 80s Sighle Humphreys supported Republican prisoners and their families, she also supported Sinn Féin and the Anti H-Block campaign. Humphreys continued to live at their home in Donnybrook for many years. She died, aged 95, at Our Lady's Hospice, Harold's Cross on 14 March 1994. Shelia Humphreys was buried at Glasnevin Cemetery, Dublin.
