= Neasa Hourigan =

Irish politician (born 1980)

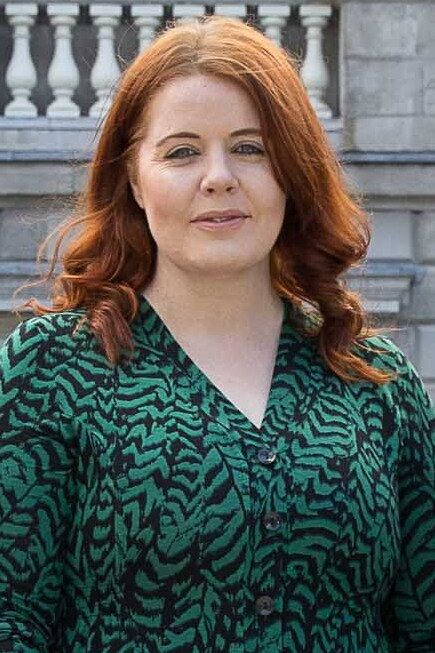
- Hourigan in 2022

Teachta Dála
- In office February 2020 – November 2024
- Constituency: Dublin Central

Chair of the Committee on Budgetary Oversight
- In office 15 September 2020 – 22 March 2023
- Preceded by: Colm Brophy

Personal details
- Born: October 1980 (age 45) Limerick, Ireland
- Party: Green Party
- Spouse: Colin Toomey (m. 2005)
- Children: 3
- Parent: Michael Hourigan (father)
- Education: TU Dublin; University College Dublin; Queen's University Belfast
- Website: neasahourigan.com

Neasa Hourigan (born October 1980) is an Irish Green Party politician who was a Teachta Dála (TD) for the Dublin Central constituency from 2020 until 2024. She was Chair of the Committee on Budgetary Oversight from September 2020 until being suspended from the parliamentary party in March 2023.

== Early life ==
Hourigan was born in Limerick. Her father Michael Hourigan is a former Fine Gael member of Limerick City Council as well as a former Mayor of Limerick. She is the sister of Niamh Hourigan, and also a distant cousin to politicians Richard Hourigan and Paddy Lane.

She was educated at Laurel Hill Coláiste. She graduated with a Bachelor of Architecture from Technological University Dublin; a Master of Architecture from University College Dublin and a post graduate certificate in Higher Education. She has lectured in sustainable communities, environmental design and green procurement at both Queen's University Belfast and Technological University Dublin.

== Political career ==
Hourigan joined the Green Party in 2011. She was elected to represent Cabra-Glasnevin local electoral area on Dublin City Council at the 2019 local elections. She is the Green Party's Spokesperson for Finance and Health.

Hourigan helped to establish the Irish Pedestrian Network born out of Dublin Blockers, a social media campaign she started in 2018 highlighting the issues pedestrians in Central Dublin were facing. Within this network, she organised an activist group, Streets are for People.

At the 2020 general election, Hourigan was elected as a TD for Dublin Central. Darcy Lonergan was then co-opted to Hourigan's seat on Dublin City Council.

On 22 July 2020, Hourigan was amongst several prominent members of the Green Party who formed the "Just Transition Greens", an affiliate group within the party with a green left/eco-socialist outlook, who have the objective of pressuring the party towards more hardline policies based on the concept of a Just Transition.

On 30 July 2020, Hourigan resigned as party whip of the Green Party, but did not leave the party after voting against the Government twice on amendments to the Residential Tenancies Bill. She was later sanctioned by party leader Eamon Ryan by having her speaking rights withdrawn for two months.

In December 2020 Hourigan, alongside fellow Green TD Patrick Costello, spoke out against the entry of Ireland into the Comprehensive Economic and Trade Agreement (CETA), a trade agreement between Canada and members of the EU, due to fears about the proposed "Investment court system". The investment court system is designed to act as a method of solving business disputes between investors and participating countries. Hourigan and Costello argued that the court system would allow Canadians investing in Ireland to sue the state if the state impeded their profits, such as with environmentalist laws, and this was a major threat to Ireland's sovereignty.

On 17 May 2022 Costello and Hourigan were both suspended from the Green Party for six months after they voted against the government on a motion calling for the new National Maternity Hospital to be built on land wholly owned by the state. Before the vote, Hourigan explained her rationale by saying she could not support the government's decision to approve plans to move the National Maternity Hospital from Holles Street to the St Vincent's Hospital campus due to concerns over the governance and ethos at the new facility, which is to be built on a site ultimately leased from the Catholic Church, and with fears in some quarters that potential lingering religious influence could mean abortions or fertility treatment would not be allowed to take place at the new hospital. The government coalition parties (Fine Gael, Fianna Fáil and the Greens) had been whipped to abstain on the motion. Costello and Hourigan were re-admitted to the parliamentary party in November 2022.

On 7 March 2023, Hourigan criticised the government for its decision to end the eviction ban, calling the decision "heartless". Hourigan also spoke out against Green Party leader Eamon Ryan, saying that he did not speak to the party's policies. Senator and Green Party Chair Pauline O'Reilly rebuked Hourigan's remarks and said that it was "clear Neasa didn't have all the facts". On 22 March 2023 Hourigan was suspended from the Green Parliamentary Party for fifteen months and removed from her committee position for voting against the government on an amendment to a Sinn Féin motion calling for the extension of the eviction ban.

On 14 July 2024, Hourigan was narrowly defeated by Senator Róisín Garvey in an election to replace Catherine Martin as deputy leader of the Green Party.

At the 2024 general election, Hourigan received 1,952 first preference votes, the seventh highest in the 4-seater Dublin Central constituency. She was eliminated on the 7th count, and lost her seat.

== Political views ==
=== Environmentalism ===
Hourigan believes the climate and biodiversity crises are urgent issues and has expressed concern over the role of large multinational corporations in driving environmental harm. Hourigan has proposed limiting the size of these corporations and breaking up those that do not operate responsibly, seeing them as significant contributors to pollution, deforestation, and emissions. She also advocates for an international approach in regulating corporate power, drawing parallels with the OECD corporate tax deal. On the issue of government funding, Hourigan is critical of Ireland’s reliance on corporate tax receipts, which she views as an unreliable source of income. While she acknowledges the benefits of corporate tax revenue, she prefers what she views as a more sustainable approach to funding, advocating for a sovereign wealth fund that would be focused on zero-carbon investments. She has also called for long-term, multi-annual funding in place of the current annual budget and electoral cycles, believing this would allow for a more consistent and effective response to the climate crisis.

Hourigan supports relocating Dublin Port to create space for housing development and reduce pollution in the city, suggesting that rail integration could help manage port-related traffic.

=== Social policies ===
Hourigan supports the decriminalisation of drug use, including hard drugs and advocates for a harm-reduction approach rather than a punitive one. She believes that treating drug use as a health issue, rather than a criminal one, would be more effective in addressing the underlying problems, and believes there should be an emphasis on reducing the stigma surrounding addiction.

Hourigan supports the decriminalisation of sex work, arguing that consenting adults should be free to make their own choices in private. She emphasises the distinction between sex trafficking and sex work, criticising the confusion of the two in Irish law. Hourigan has stated that while Ireland is one of the worst EU countries for prosecuting sex trafficking, sex workers are still criminalised despite often engaging in consensual work. She believes that when two adults are involved, their human rights and choices should be respected, as long as no harm is being caused to others.

=== Foreign policy ===
In March 2024 Hourigan called for an immediate ceasefire in the Gaza war, asserting that the situation amounts to genocide. She rejects accusations that criticising the actions in Gaza is antisemitic, affirming that Ireland, as a neutral country, has a valid position based on human rights. Hourigan has also expressed opposition to moving away from Ireland’s neutrality, particularly concerning changes to Ireland's triple lock mechanism for military deployment, but has backed increased investment in Ireland’s Defence Forces, particularly for the protection of offshore energy infrastructure.

== Personal life ==
Hourigan lives in Cabra, Dublin. She has three children, one of whom is hard of hearing and is registered as blind.

Her sister Niamh Hourigan was an unsuccessful Labour Party candidate in the 2024 European Parliament elections.

Dáil	Election	Deputy (Party)	Deputy (Party)	Deputy (Party)	Deputy (Party)
19th	1969	Frank Cluskey (Lab)	Vivion de Valera (FF)	Thomas J. Fitzpatrick (FF)	Maurice E. Dockrell (FG)
20th	1973	Frank Cluskey (Lab)	Vivion de Valera (FF)	Thomas J. Fitzpatrick (FF)	Maurice E. Dockrell (FG)
21st	1977	Constituency abolished			

Dáil	Election	Deputy (Party)	Deputy (Party)	Deputy (Party)	Deputy (Party)	Deputy (Party)
22nd	1981	Bertie Ahern (FF)	Michael Keating (FG)	Alice Glenn (FG)	Michael O'Leary (Lab)	George Colley (FF)
23rd	1982 (Feb)	Bertie Ahern (FF)	Michael Keating (FG)	Tony Gregory (Ind.)	Michael O'Leary (Lab)	George Colley (FF)
24th	1982 (Nov)	Bertie Ahern (FF)	Michael Keating (FG)	Tony Gregory (Ind.)	Alice Glenn (FG)	George Colley (FF)
24th	1983 by-election	Bertie Ahern (FF)	Michael Keating (FG)	Tony Gregory (Ind.)	Alice Glenn (FG)	Tom Leonard (FF)
25th	1987	Bertie Ahern (FF)	Michael Keating (PDs)	Tony Gregory (Ind.)	Dermot Fitzpatrick (FF)	John Stafford (FF)
26th	1989	Bertie Ahern (FF)	Pat Lee (FG)	Tony Gregory (Ind.)	Dermot Fitzpatrick (FF)	John Stafford (FF)
27th	1992	Bertie Ahern (FF)	Jim Mitchell (FG)	Tony Gregory (Ind.)	Joe Costello (Lab)	4 seats 1992–2016
28th	1997	Bertie Ahern (FF)	Jim Mitchell (FG)	Tony Gregory (Ind.)	Marian McGennis (FF)	4 seats 1992–2016
29th	2002	Bertie Ahern (FF)	Dermot Fitzpatrick (FF)	Tony Gregory (Ind.)	Joe Costello (Lab)	4 seats 1992–2016
30th	2007	Bertie Ahern (FF)	Cyprian Brady (FF)	Tony Gregory (Ind.)	Joe Costello (Lab)	4 seats 1992–2016
30th	2009 by-election	Bertie Ahern (FF)	Cyprian Brady (FF)	Maureen O'Sullivan (Ind.)	Joe Costello (Lab)	4 seats 1992–2016
31st	2011	Mary Lou McDonald (SF)	Paschal Donohoe (FG)	Maureen O'Sullivan (Ind.)	Joe Costello (Lab)	4 seats 1992–2016
32nd	2016	Mary Lou McDonald (SF)	Paschal Donohoe (FG)	Maureen O'Sullivan (Ind.)	3 seats 2016–2020	
33rd	2020	Mary Lou McDonald (SF)	Paschal Donohoe (FG)	Gary Gannon (SD)	Neasa Hourigan (GP)	4 seats from 2020
34th	2024	Mary Lou McDonald (SF)	Paschal Donohoe (FG)	Gary Gannon (SD)	Marie Sherlock (Lab)	4 seats from 2020
34th	2026 by-election	Mary Lou McDonald (SF)	Daniel Ennis (SD)	Gary Gannon (SD)	Marie Sherlock (Lab)	4 seats from 2020
