= Knocknagorteeny =

Knocknagorteeny Cnoc na nGoirtíní
- Interactive map of Knocknagorteeny
- Coordinates: 52°39′24″N 8°25′57″W
- Country: Ireland
- Province: Munster
- County: County Limerick
- Barony: Owneybeg
- Civil parish: Abington

Area
  - Total: 1.765 km^{2} (0.681 sq mi)

Knocknagorteeny (Irish: Cnoc na nGoirtíní, "hill of the small gardens") is a townland in the civil parish of Abington, County Limerick, Ireland. It lies in the electoral division of Clonkeen, west of Murroe and near the border with County Tipperary, and covers about 176.5 hectares (436 acres).

== Etymology ==
A 1930s Schools' Collection entry from the area gives the name as "the hill of the small garden", after a hill above the townland. The townland is recorded in the 1826 Tithe Applotment survey and in Griffith's Valuation (1851), where the Hourigan holding known as "The Hill" was the largest in the townland.

=== Alternative spelling ===
- Knocknagorty: Found as an alternate variation in nineteenth-century geographical and administrative indexes.
- Knocknagornagh: Frequently cross-referenced, substituted, or confused with the townland in early census collection indexes.
- Knocknagorteny: A common variant spelling omitting the modern double-e, frequently appearing in local nineteenth-century land surveys and tax records.
- Knocknagurteeny or Knock Na Gurteeny: A phonetic spelling reflecting the traditional West Munster Irish vowel shift from goirtín to guirtín in local speech.

== Notable people ==
- Sir Thomas Hackett (died 1706): Jacobite politician and Lord Mayor of Dublin (1687–1688). He was the primary 17th-century landlord of the area, holding a vast leasehold on both the Annagh and Knocknagorteeny estates until his political ruin following the Williamite War in Ireland.
- John Harty (1867–1946): Roman Catholic prelate who served as the Archbishop of Cashel and Emly from 1913 until his death. Born in Knocknagorteeny, Murroe, County Limerick, he was educated at Maynooth College and later became a prominent advocate for agricultural education and local development in Munster.
- Henry Petty-Fitzmaurice, 5th Marquess of Lansdowne (1845–1927): British statesman who served as Governor General of Canada, Viceroy of India, and Foreign Secretary. His sprawling Lansdowne estate in County Limerick encompassed tens of thousands of acres, including mapped tenant configurations in Knocknagorteeny up until the localized sales under the Irish Land Acts.
- Mary Gill (née Hourigan) (born 1884): mother of Tomás Mac Giolla, president of Sinn Féin, leader of the Workers' Party and Lord Mayor of Dublin. A daughter of Patrick Hourigan of The Hill, Knocknagorteeny, she married Robert Paul Gill, the engineer and architect who designed "New Tipperary" and a brother of T. P. Gill, MP.
