= James Humphrys =

Irish politician (1805–1899)

- Born: 1805; Glenstal, County Limerick
- Died: 24 July 1899 (aged 93–94)
- Occupations: poor law guardian and farmer

James ("The Squire") Humphrys (1805–1899) was a poor law guardian and farmer in Glenstal and Boher, County Limerick.

== Life ==
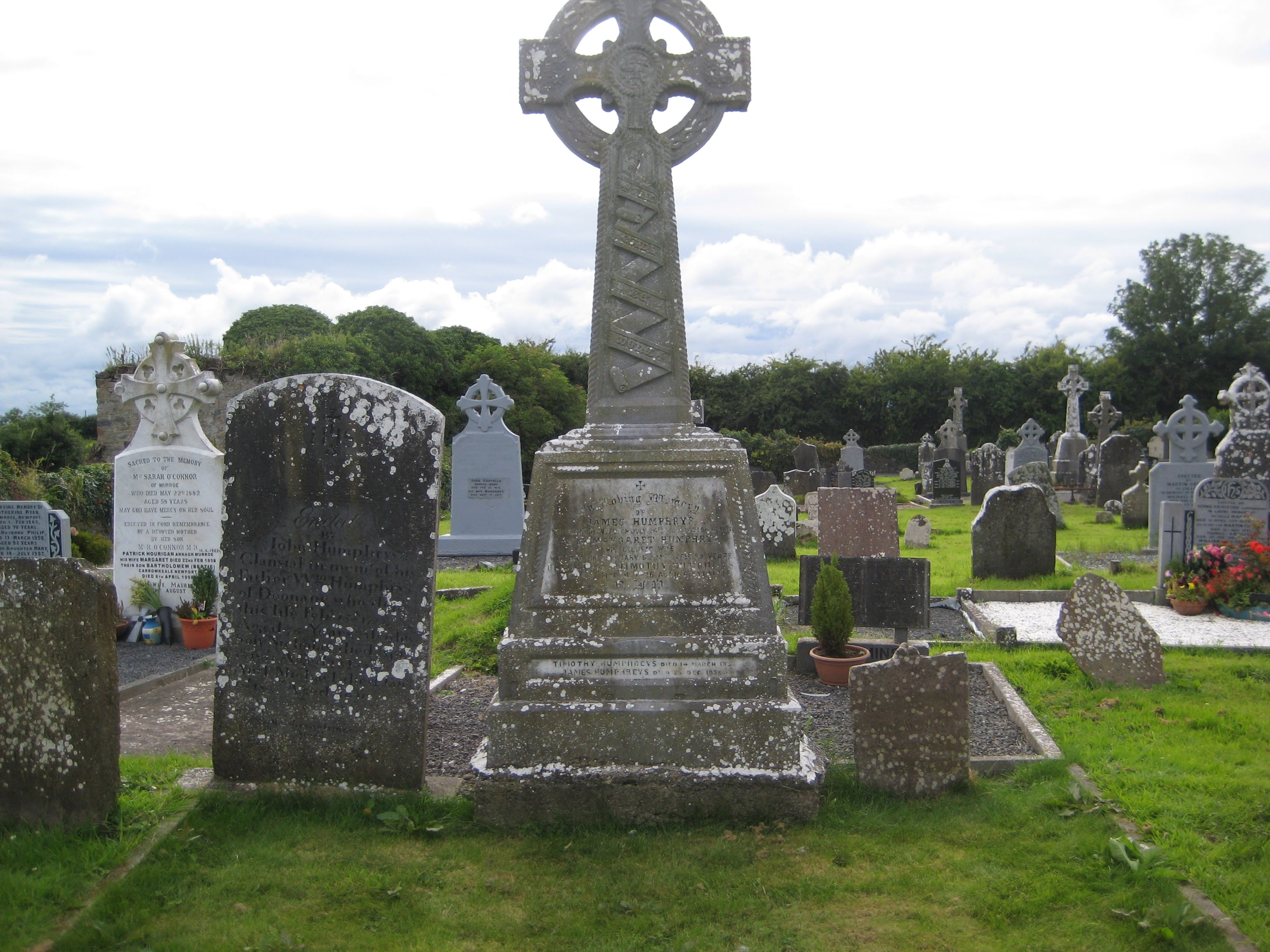
Grave of James Humphrys

Born in 1805 in Glenstal, he was educated in a hedge school and became a tenant farmer in Glenstal, County Limerick leasing from Sir Matthew Barrington, 2nd Baronet of the Barrington baronets of Limerick. He married Margaret Ryan in 1841. He was father-in-law to the Irish revolutionary activist Nell Humphreys through his son, David.

He became a Poor Law Guardian for the Poor Law Union of Limerick and is described as such in an 1876 newspaper report and in an 1882 court dispute with his landlord Sir Croker Barrington, 4th Baronet about payment of rent. As a result of the dispute, Barrington put the lease on the Humphrys farm at Glenstal up for sale, and Humphrys had to buy it back, which he did. In 1883, he sued Sir Croker Barrington for having allowed sheep to trespass on his lands at Glenstal. He won the case, and Sir Croker was fined.

Humphrys died on 24 July 1899, and Margaret Humphrys in 1909. On her death there was a vote of sympathy at meeting of Limerick Guardians. There is a stained glass window in honour of James and Margaret Humphrys in Murroe Church, erected by one of their children, Rev. James Humphreys.

Through his son, Timothy, he was the grandfather of the hurler Jimmy Humphreys.
