= Patrick Hourigan =

Irish local politician (c. 1934–2022)

Cathaoirleach of Limerick County Council
- In office 1993–1994

Member of Limerick County Council for Castleconnell
- In office 1972–2004
- Preceded by: John D. O'Dwyer

Personal details
- Born: c. 1934 The Orchards, Annagh, County Limerick, Ireland
- Died: 7 May 2022 Annagh, Lisnagry, County Limerick, Ireland
- Resting place: Annagh Cemetery, County Limerick
- Party: Fine Gael
- Spouse: Anne
- Children: 4, including Monica, Kathleen, James and Patrick
- Parent(s): James Hourigan (1893–1973); Mona Frances (née Lane) Hourigan (1903–1970)
- Relatives: Richard Hourigan (brother); Fr. Michael Hourigan (brother)

Patrick "Paddy" Hourigan (c. 1934 – 7 May 2022) was an Irish Fine Gael politician who represented the Castleconnell electoral area on Limerick County Council from 1972 to 2004, and who served as Mayor of Limerick (Cathaoirleach) from 1993 to 1994. Over a public life spanning more than three decades, he became one of the best-known local Fine Gael figures in East Limerick.

== Background ==
Hourigan was born c. 1934 into a farming family at The Orchards, a house at Annagh near Lisnagry, County Limerick, built by his father in the early 1930s. He was one of several children of James Hourigan (1893–1973), a farmer, and Mona Frances Hourigan (née Lane; 1903–1970).

Among his siblings was Richard Hourigan (1939–2002), who served as a Fine Gael senator for the Agricultural Panel between 1982 and 1987 and again from 1989 to 1993; a contemporary obituary of Richard Hourigan noted that his brother Paddy is a current member of the County Council. Fine Gael TD Kieran O'Donnell, who worked alongside Hourigan for many years, later described the two brothers together as a "legend" in Limerick Fine Gael politics. Another brother, Fr. Michael Joseph Hourigan (1941–2012), was a Catholic priest who spent his ministry in the Archdiocese of Miami, Florida, latterly as parish priest of St Bernard's, Sunrise, and St Paul the Apostle, Lighthouse Point; Fr Hourigan's obituary named "his brother, Paddy Hourigan, and his wife Anne" among the family he left behind, along with several sisters.

Hourigan married Anne, and the couple had four children — daughters Monica and Kathleen, and sons James and Patrick.

== Political career ==
=== Entry to Limerick County Council ===
Hourigan was co-opted to Limerick County Council in 1972 for the Castleconnell electoral area, filling the vacancy left by the resignation of John D. O'Dwyer. He went on to hold the seat at five successive local elections, in 1974, 1979, 1985, 1991 and 1999.

His first election, in 1974, was closely fought: he took the sixth and final seat with 829 first-preference votes (8.4 per cent). His personal vote grew substantially over the following term, and at the 1979 election he polled 1,290 first preferences (25.1 per cent), comfortably exceeding the quota on the first count. He was re-elected in 1985 (1,364 votes, 12.9 per cent), in 1991 (1,048 votes, 9.2 per cent) and in 1999 (899 votes, 7.3 per cent).

=== Mayor of Limerick County Council, 1993–1994 ===
Hourigan was elected Mayor (Cathaoirleach) of Limerick County Council for the 1993–1994 term, the senior civic office within the county local authority at that time (distinct from the office of Mayor of the city of Limerick, which was held separately by Limerick City Council).

=== 1999 election and 2004 defeat ===
Hourigan retained his seat in 1999 but was defeated at the 2004 local elections, polling 1,069 first-preference votes (7.4 per cent), short of the quota required for re-election. His defeat ended 32 years of continuous service on the council and was noted in the national press as the loss of the council's longest-serving member.

== Later life ==
Following his retirement from elected office, Hourigan remained active in community life in the Castleconnell and Murroe area. In May 2014, by then approximately 80 years old, he attended the final meeting of the Castleconnell electoral area committee, held at Nicker before the abolition of the old county-and-city council structures later that year, where former and serving councillors were honoured for their service. Speaking at the meeting, Hourigan paid tribute to former colleagues and council staff who had died, adding that "there is big change coming and I hope it is for the better."

He was photographed supporting the Team Limerick Clean-Up initiative in 2015. Hourigan was also a long-standing friend of Paddy Rainsford, a fellow Annagh resident and Fine Gael activist; the two men had gone for a drink together most Sundays for decades at Lee's Bar in Newport until Rainsford's death in December 2019.

== Death ==
Hourigan died at his home in Annagh, Lisnagry, on 7 May 2022. The Mayor of the City and County of Limerick, Cllr Daniel Butler, led tributes, describing him as "one of life's true gentlemen". A special meeting of Limerick City and County Council was convened online on 10 May 2022 to record a vote of sympathy, and the Irish flag was flown at half-mast on council buildings until after his funeral. Kieran O'Donnell described him as "a colossus in Limerick and local politics" and recalled his "remarkable political brain".

Hourigan reposed at Meehan's Funeral Home, Newport, on 9 May 2022. His funeral Mass was held at the Holy Rosary Church, Murroe, on 10 May 2022, followed by burial in Annagh Cemetery.

== Electoral history ==
Election	First preferences	Share	Result
1974	829	8.4%	Elected
1979	1,290	25.1%	Elected
1985	1,364	12.9%	Elected
1991	1,048	9.2%	Elected
1999	899	7.3%	Elected
2004	1,069	7.4%	Not elected

Source: IrelandElection.com, Castleconnell electoral area results, 1974–2004.
