= Manchán Magan =

Irish writer (1970–2025)

- Born: 20 August 1970; Dublin, Ireland
- Died: 2 October 2025 (aged 55); Dublin
- Resting place: Hill of Uisneach
- Education: University College Dublin; Gonzaga College; Mount Anville Montessori School
- Spouse: Aisling Rogerson (m. 2025)
- Relatives: Ruán Magan (brother), Líadain von der Decken (sister)
- Writing career
- Years active: 1996–2025
- Subjects: Irish language and Culture of Ireland
- Website: www.manchan.com

Manchán Magan (20 August 1970 – 2 October 2025) was an Irish author, traveller, broadcaster and documentary maker. His works covered a wide range of topics, particularly the Irish language, culture, and the natural world.

== Early life ==
Magan was born on 20 August 1970 in Donnybrook, Dublin, and brought up in an Irish-speaking family there. His father, Michael, was a radiologist at St James’s Hospital. His mother, Cróine, is the daughter of Sighle Humphreys.

Magan went to Mount Anville Montessori School before attending Gonzaga College in Ranelagh (he also spent one year in Coláiste na Rinne). He later studied Irish and history at University College Dublin. After graduating, he travelled over-land to Zaire (present day DR Congo), which inspired his first book, Manchán ar Seachrán.

Magan's family background was nationalist and closely associated with the foundation of the Irish State in that he is the grandson of Sighle Humphreys and great-grandnephew of The O'Rahilly. He was also a distant relative of Aogán Ó Rathaille, the last great poet of the Bardic school. He explored these connections in various documentaries for TG4 and RTÉ.

== Career ==
He presented No Béarla, a documentary series about travelling around Ireland speaking only Irish and wrote regularly for The Irish Times.

His television series included Crainn na hÉireann, a 10-part series on the trees of Ireland, and An Fód Deireanach, a four-part series for TG4 about Irish bogs and peatland.

Magan made over 70 travel documentaries focusing on issues of world cultures and globalisation, 12 of them packaged under the Global Nomad series with his brother Ruán Magan.

Magan also presented Manchán's A-Z of Ireland, a 5-episode road trip around Ireland unearthing unusual and unique aspects of Ireland’s natural heritage, and two series of The Almanac of Ireland, which explored the quirks, conundrums and wonders of Ireland’s cultural heritage. Both series were produced by Colette Kinsella of Red Hare Media and broadcast on RTÉ Radio 1 and on podcast platforms.

Magan hosted the podcast Home Stories, a series of chats with people living in Direct Provision Centres in Abbeyleix, Emo, Mountrath and Athlone. The chats were edited by Lauren Varien with music by Brían MacGloinn (of Ye Vagabonds) and Myles O'Reilly.

In 2024, he released a series of extracts of talks by the late John Moriarty, the County Kerry philosopher, in podcast form: The Bog Shaman: Manchán Magan on Moriarty.

== Activism ==
He stood for the Green Party in the Longford–Westmeath constituency in the 2016 Irish general election; he received the 11th highest first preference votes (1104, 2%) of the 18 candidates and was eliminated on the eighth round.

In 2022, Magan released a cover of Kneecap's song "C.E.A.R.T.A" to help raise money for a volunteer gym in the Aida Refugee Camp in Bethlehem, Palestine.

He served on the board of Hometree, a nature restoration charity based in the west of Ireland.

== Personal life ==
He built and lived in a straw-bale house, which he removed and replaced with a mud and cement, grass-roofed house, in County Westmeath.

In 2012 he spent time as a writer in residence with the Centre Culturel Irlandais in Paris.

=== Illness and death ===
In an interview on 13 September 2025, Magan revealed he had terminal prostate cancer, that had spread to multiple organs in his body.

Magan died in Dublin on 2 October 2025, at the age of 55. He married his partner of 11 years, Aisling Rogerson, six weeks before his death.

On the one month's memorial of his death, around 2,500 people gathered on the ancient Hill of Uisneach to honour his life by scattering his ashes.

== Bibliography ==
Magan wrote three books in Irish, Baba-ji agus TnaG, Manchán ar Seachrán and Bí i nGrá. His English travel books include Angels & Rabies: A Journey through the Americas, Manchán's Travels: A Journey through India, and Truck Fever: A Journey through Africa. In 2020, Magan published Thirty Two Words for Field: Lost words of the Irish landscape. In 2021 he published the children's book Tree Dogs, Banshee Fingers and Other Words for Nature with illustrations by Steve Doogan. In 2022 his book Listen to the Land Speak was published by Gill Books.

- Manchán ar Seachrán. Coiscéim. 1998.
- Baba-ji agus TnaG, Seachrán san India. Coiscéim. 2005.
- Angels and Rabies: A journey through the Americas. Brandon Books / Mount Eagle Publications Ltd. 2006. ISBN 978-0-8632-2349-5.
- Manchán's Travels: A Journey Through India. Brandon Books / Mount Eagle Publications Ltd. 2007. ISBN 978-0-8632-2368-6.
- Bí i nGrá. Coiscéim. 2008.
- Truck Fever: A Journey Through Africa. Brandon Books / Mount Eagle Publications Ltd. 2008. ISBN 978-0-8632-2389-1.
- Oddballs: A Novel of Affections. Brandon Books / Mount Eagle Publications Ltd. 2010. ISBN 978-0-8632-2424-9.
- Thirty Two Words for Field. Gill Books. 2020. ISBN 978-0-7171-8797-3.
- Sea Tamagotchi. Redfox Press. 2020.
- Tree dogs, banshee fingers and other Irish words for nature. Gill Children's. 2021. ISBN 978-07171-9255-7.
- Dána Gránna: Nasty Words for People. Redfox Press. 2022.
- Listen To The Land Speak. Gill Books. 2022. ISBN 978-0-7171-9259-5.
- Wolf Men And Water Hounds. Gill Children'. 2023. ISBN 978-0-7171-9611-1.
- Focail na mBan: Women's Words. Mayo Books Press. 2023. ISBN 978-1-9145-9615-5.
- Irish Words For Nature. Gill Children's. 2024. ISBN 978-1-8045-8334-0.
- Brehons and Brahmins: Resonances between Irish and Indian cultures. Mayo Books Press. 2024. ISBN 978-1-9145-9640-7.
- Ireland in Iceland: Gaelic Remnants in a Nordic Land. Mayo Books Press. 2025. ISBN 978-1-9145-9635-3.
- Ninety-Nine Words For Rain (And One For Sun). Gill Books. 2025. ISBN 978-1-8045-8334-0.

== Filmography ==
- Manchán ar Seachrán (1996)
- Manchán i Meiriceá Theas (1997)
- Manchán in Éirinn (1998)
- Manchán USA (2000)
- Manchán Um Nollaig (2000)
- Manchan i dTenerife (2001)
- Manchán sa Mheán Oirthear (2001)
- Nasc (2002)
- Manchan sa tSín (2003)
- No Béarla (2007)
- Cé a Chónaigh i mo Theachsa? (2010 & 2012)
- Déanta in Éirinn (2012)
- Bás Arto Leary (2013)
- Crainn na hÉireann (2016)
- DNA Caillte (2020)
- An Fód Deireanach (2022)
- Ag Triall ar an Tobar (2024)
