= Annagh, County Limerick =

Townland in County Limerick, Ireland

Annagh An tEanach
- Location within Ireland
- Coordinates: 52.676°N 8.450°W
- Country: Ireland
- Province: Munster
- County: Limerick
- Barony: Owneybeg
- Civil parish: Abington

Area
  - Total: 3.5 km^{2} (1.4 sq mi)

Annagh (Irish: An tEanach, meaning 'the marsh') is a townland of about 350 ha (860 acres) in the civil parish of Abington and the historical barony of Owneybeg, County Limerick, Ireland. It lies in the north-east of the county, about 5 km (3.1 mi) north-west of Murroe and close to the border with County Tipperary, and its postal address is Lisnagry. The townland contains five recorded monuments, including a Neolithic cave burial excavated in 1992 and a ruined late medieval church and graveyard, and the site of a castle recorded in the 17th century but no longer visible.

== Etymology ==
The Irish name An tEanach derives from eanach, meaning "marsh", and the Placenames Database of Ireland gives the English meaning of the townland name as "the marsh". Many townlands in Ireland are named Annagh, including several in County Limerick.

== Geography ==
=== Location ===
Annagh is in north-east County Limerick, about 5 km (3.1 mi) north-west of the village of Murroe and north-east of the Limerick suburbs of Annacotty and Castletroy. Its postal address is Lisnagry (Eircode routing key V94), reflecting its position within the Lisnagry postal district rather than any village centre. Primary schools at Murroe and Lisnagry are both within about 5 km (3.1 mi) by road. The townland is about 15 km (9.3 mi) north-east of Limerick. Funerals from Annagh are held at the Holy Rosary Church in Murroe.

Annagh is in the electoral division of Clonkeen and the Cappamore–Kilmallock municipal district, and in the Murroe registration district of the Limerick Poor Law Union. A directory of the early 19th century lists Annagh with Newport in County Tipperary as its post town.

=== Rivers ===
The plain to the west of the townland is drained by the Annagh and Newport rivers. The Annagh River, known as the Clare River in its upper reaches, forms part of the boundary between Limerick and Tipperary. The Annagh and Newport rivers meet north of Annagh Bridge, and the combined watercourse is part of the Mulkear River system, a tributary of the River Shannon.

==== Flooding ====
Low-lying parts of the townland flood in wet weather. In October 2019 local councillors said that up to five houses in lower Annagh were at risk after heavy rain left the L1122 road under water, and called on the Office of Public Works (OPW) to extend its drainage maintenance to the area. The OPW's Mulkear Flood Relief Scheme covers the embankments up to the confluence of the Newport and Annagh rivers, and a 2023–24 public consultation concerned treatment of invasive plant species on the Annagh River.

== History ==
=== Prehistory: the Annagh cave burial ===
On 27 February 1992 a digger stripping topsoil at a limestone quarry in the townland, in advance of blasting, dislodged a large pillar-like slab and exposed a natural cavern containing human skulls. The find was reported to the National Museum of Ireland by the Garda Síochána at Killaloe, and the site was excavated in March and May 1992 by Raghnall Ó Floinn.

The cave is an oval chamber about 4.5 m (15 ft) long and 2.5 m (8.2 ft) wide, formed along a natural fault line, on the north-west slope of a hill with views to the north and east. The remains of at least five individuals were found, all mature males, two of them elderly by the standards of the period. Two of the skeletons were articulated, in crouched positions, and the others were disarticulated. The osteological analysis suggested the men had done hard physical work and may have been related. Grave goods included pottery bowls of Drimnagh and globular ("Goodland") type, a perforated antler tine, a bone barbell toggle, a bone point, and flint tools including a discoidal knife and a leaf-shaped arrowhead.

The pottery resembles that from Linkardstown-type burials of the fourth millennium BC, and the closest parallels for the globular bowls come from Rockbarton (Cahirguillamore) in the same county. Seven radiocarbon dates (five from human bone, two from animal bone) form a tight group, which the excavator took to indicate a single use or a short period of use of the cave. The cave, recorded as SMR LI006-079, is cited as an example of the use of natural caves for burial in the Irish Neolithic, together with Kilgreany Cave in County Waterford. It is also listed in the Irish Caves Database as a cave about 5 m (16 ft) long at an altitude of 60 m (200 ft).

=== Medieval and early modern ===
Annagh lay in the territory of Owney, associated with the Ó Maoilriain (Ryan) lords. The Civil Survey of 1654–56 records John Ryan as owner in Annagh of "land with a Castle two Orchards and a mill seate". The castle (SMR LI006-068001) appears on the Down Survey maps but is not marked on the 19th-century Ordnance Survey maps, and no trace of it has been identified. The location of the associated medieval watermill is likewise unknown. A field opposite the church is known locally as "the Castle Field".

After the Cromwellian confiscations of the 1650s the lands passed to Colonel Richard Lawrence, and in 1666 to Roger Boyle, 1st Earl of Orrery. Sir Thomas Hackett leased them in the early 1670s, and after his bankruptcy they were bought by George Evans, leased to John Waltho and Joseph Barrington, and purchased in 1840 by Sir Matthew Barrington. The Barrington family held them until the 1920s.

=== 19th and 20th centuries ===
Annagh Bridge, a triple-arch road bridge over the River Newport, was built around 1820. The Orchards, a house built in 1932, bears a slate recording that it was erected for James Hourigan, whose sons included the senator Richard Hourigan, to designs by P. O'Brien of Fedamore, with M. Rainsford of Newport as builder.

During the Irish War of Independence, Patrick Ryan of Annagh, a 23-year-old farmer and captain in the Mid Limerick Brigade of the IRA, was one of four volunteers killed by British forces at the Lackelly Ambush near Knocklong on 2 May 1921.

== Landmarks ==
=== Archaeological monuments ===
The Record of Monuments and Places (RMP) for County Limerick, established under section 12 of the National Monuments (Amendment) Act 1994, lists five monuments in Annagh. Their Irish Grid references are given to the nearest 10 metres. A medieval castle (LI006-068001) and mill (LI006-068003) were added to the Sites and Monuments Record later.

RMP no.	Type	Irish Grid (E, N)	Notes
LI006-013	Enclosure	169160, 158140	
LI006-014	Enclosure	169440, 158040	
LI006-01501	Church	169930, 158890	Late medieval ruin
LI006-01502	Graveyard	169930, 158890	74 recorded memorials
LI006-068001	Castle	not located	Recorded in the Civil Survey; no visible remains
LI006-068003	Water mill	not located	Medieval mill belonging to the castle
LI006-079	Cave burial	169390, 158350	Neolithic; excavated 1992

Annagh Church is a ruined late medieval building of about 14 m × 5.5 m (46 ft × 18 ft), with a two-light ogee-headed east window and a pointed-arch doorway in the south wall. The surrounding graveyard is still in use for burials.

=== Protected structures ===
Two buildings in the townland are in the National Inventory of Architectural Heritage (NIAH), each with a regional rating:

- Annagh Bridge (reg. 21900629), a triple-arch road bridge over the River Newport, built c. 1820. It has limestone and sandstone walls, rusticated voussoirs and V-shaped cutwaters.
- The Orchards (reg. 21900632), a three-bay, two-storey L-plan house of 1932 with a hipped slate roof and timber sash windows, built for James Hourigan.

== Notable people ==
- Richard Hourigan (1939–2002), a Fine Gael politician, was born at The Orchards, Annagh, the second son of James Hourigan and Mona Lane. He was a member of Seanad Éireann for the Agricultural Panel from 1982 to 1987 and from 1989 to 1993, and is buried in Abington graveyard.
- Patrick Hourigan (died May 2022), known as Paddy, a Fine Gael councillor who represented the Castleconnell area on Limerick County Council from the late 1970s until his retirement in 2004, and served as its Cathaoirleach. He was a brother of Richard Hourigan. He died at his home in Annagh and was buried in Annagh cemetery.
- Patrick Ryan (died 1921), an IRA volunteer from Annagh killed at the Lackelly Ambush.

== See also ==
- List of townlands of County Limerick
- Murroe
- Abington (civil parish)
- Hourigan family
