= Richard Hourigan =

Irish politician (1939–2002)

Senator
- In office 1 November 1989 – 17 February 1993
- In office 13 May 1982 – 25 April 1987
- Constituency: Agricultural Panel

Personal details
- Born: 1 April 1939 County Limerick, Ireland
- Died: 9 November 2002 (aged 63) County Limerick, Ireland
- Party: Fine Gael
- Education: University College Dublin

Richard V. Hourigan (1 April 1939 – 9 November 2002) was a Fine Gael politician from County Limerick in Ireland. He was a senator for most of the years from 1982 to 1987, and from 1989 to 1993.

== Background ==
Richard Hourigan was born at the demesne The Orchards, Annagh, Lisnagry, County Limerick, Ireland, in April 1939. He was the second son of Mona Lane and James Hourigan, both originating from influential farming families in County Clare and County Limerick. He is also a first cousin of Paddy Lane, Michael Hourigan, and cousin of Neasa Hourigan.

He was educated at St Munchin's College, Limerick, and later at University College Dublin (UCD). Hourigan had a reputation as a formidable speaker, winning the president's gold medal for oratory while at UCD. Jim Farrelly's Who's Who in Irish Politics, 1990–1991, described Hourigan as "an able, witty speaker who is extremely knowledgeable on farming and on farmer politics".

== Political career ==
Hourigan stood unsuccessfully as a Fine Gael candidate for Dáil Éireann in the Limerick East constituency at the 1981 general election. In 1982, he was elected to the 16th Seanad on the Agricultural Panel, and was re-elected in 1983 to the 17th Seanad, serving until the 1987 elections. He was re-elected at the 1989 election to the 19th Seanad, but was defeated at the 1993 Seanad elections, and failed to regain the seat when he stood again in 1997.

=== Seanad activity ===
During his membership of the 17th and 19th Seanad, Hourigan contributed to debates on agriculture and livestock farming. On 13 March 1986, during a debate on a report by the Joint Committee on the Secondary Legislation of the European Communities concerning the use of hormones as growth promoters in cattle, Hourigan discussed the economic implications of the practice. He estimated that the substances were worth approximately £40 million annually to the Irish cattle industry and considered the potential effects of a European ban on trade. He also suggested that Ireland could promote its agricultural exports by emphasising the production of hormone-free meat. Other senators, including Senator Hussey, referred to his contribution during the debate.

On 29 November 1989, he participated in a debate on agricultural policy and food processing. He criticised the practice of producing goods before identifying potential markets, arguing that production should instead be adapted to market demand. Another senator expressed agreement with this position during the debate.

On 8 March 1990, during a debate on damage caused by the storms and floods of the winter of 1989–90, Hourigan addressed the issue of insurance for farms affected by the severe weather. Another senator referred to his contribution, stating that she did not need to address the subject again. The difficulties experienced by farmers in County Limerick were also raised during the sitting.

On 15 May 1991, during the second-stage debate on the Adoption Bill, 1990, Hourigan spoke on the proposed legislation, which was introduced by Alan Shatter and provided for the recognition under Irish law of adoptions carried out abroad. The bill subsequently became the Adoption Act 1991. Hourigan argued that the legalisation of abortion abroad contributed to the decline in the number of children available for adoption in Ireland. Another senator disputed this explanation, suggesting that changes in family structures and reduced social stigma towards unmarried mothers were more likely factors.

On 26 February 1992, Hourigan was among the Fine Gael senators who voted in favour of an amendment during a debate on the difference between prices paid to agricultural producers and prices charged to consumers. The amendment referred to the Competition Act, 1991 and the findings of the Culliton Report on the development of the agri-food industry.

== Death ==
Hourigan died in County Limerick on 9 November 2002, aged 63. He was buried in Abington graveyard.
