= Paddy Lane (politician) =

Irish politician (1934–2012)

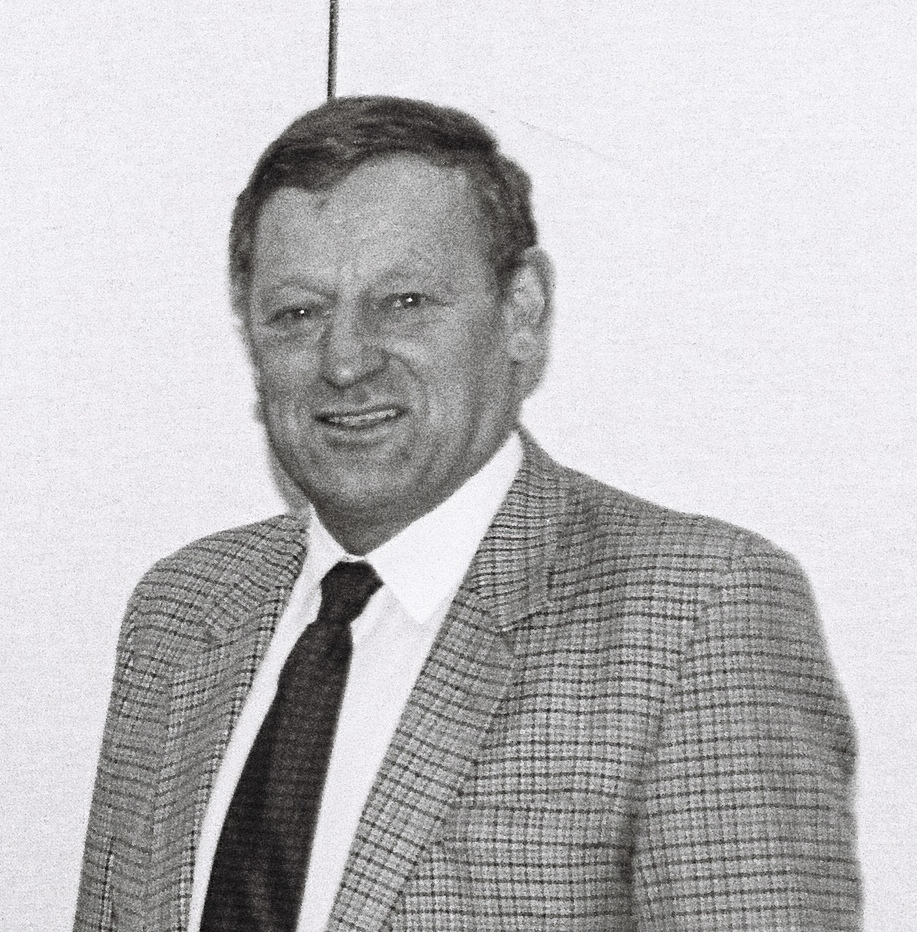
- Lane in 1992

Member of the European Parliament
- In office June 1989 – June 1994
- Constituency: Munster

President of the Irish Farmers' Association
- In office 1976–1980
- Preceded by: T. J. Maher
- Succeeded by: Donal Cashman

Personal details
- Born: Patrick Lane; 7 September 1934 Parteen, County Clare, Ireland
- Died: 23 July 2012 (aged 77) Limerick, Ireland
- Party: Fianna Fáil
- Other political affiliations: EP: European Democratic Alliance (1989–1994)
- Spouse: Carmel O'Connor (m. 1964; died 2011)
- Children: 4
- Education: Crescent College

Military service
- Allegiance: Ireland
- Branch/service: Irish Army
- Rank: Lieutenant
- Unit: 13th Battalion

Patrick Lane (7 September 1934 – 23 July 2012) was an Irish Fianna Fáil politician. He was president of the Irish Farmers' Association from 1976 to 1980 and elected Member of the European Parliament (MEP) from 1989 to 1994. He was deputy president of the association from 1974 to 1976. Lane played multiple competitions including rugby union for Ireland, earning a single cap in 1964.

== Early life ==
Lane was born in Quinpool, Parteen, County Clare, Ireland to Thomas Lane and Gertrude McCormack who were running the family farm. He was the only son among four children. He studied at Crescent College, where he started playing rugby. He played for Crescent College teams coached by the Jesuit Thomas Guinane that won the Munster Schools' Senior Cup three times in about six years. As a youth he was a four-time Munster breaststroke champion and a two-time Munster polo champion. He is a cousin of Irish politicians Richard Hourigan and Neasa Hourigan.

He later joined the army and where we was promoted to the rank of Captain. He was commissioned in 1954 in the 13th Battalion at Clonmel and transferred to the army reserves after his father's death in 1955. He captained Old Crescent RFC in the 1957–58, 1958–59 and 1960–61 seasons. Paddy played for Munster against the All-Blacks in 1963. He won a cap for the Irish rugby team against Wales in 1964 as hooker. The match, played at Lansdowne Road on 7 March 1964, ended in a 15–6 defeat for Ireland. He made about fifteen appearances for Munster between 1958 and 1965 and retired from rugby in 1965.

== Political career ==
Lane became involved in the National Farmers' Association, the forerunner of the Irish Farmers' Association (IFA), and was its Munster vice-president from 1969 to 1974. He succeeded T. J. Maher as IFA president in 1976 and held the office until 1980. In 1979 he led the association's opposition to a 2 per cent levy on farm sales proposed by the Minister for Finance, George Colley. He was a director of the Bank of Ireland from 1981 until he entered politics. The IFA conferred honorary life membership on him in 2012.

He was elected to the European Parliament at the 1989 European election for the Munster constituency. He took the last of the five seats with 41,152 first-preference votes (8.3%). He was a member of the Committee on Agriculture, Fisheries and Rural Development in the European Parliament. He was vice-chair of the committee from 15 January 1992 to the end of the term, and sat in the European Democratic Alliance group. He lost his seat at the 1994 European election. He received 19,369 first-preference votes (5.3%).

== Later life ==
Lane maintained his farming activity in parallel of his political career, as well as when retiring from it. His herd was wiped out by disease in 1975 and again in 1984; he subsequently moved from dairying to tillage and beef finishing, was running an all-cattle operation by 1991, and retired from farming in the late 1990s.

=== Death ===
Lane died on 23 July 2012, aged 77, at the Mid Western Regional Hospital in Limerick. The IFA president, John Bryan, described him as a "powerful voice for farmers".
