= Irish Farmers' Association =

Trade organisation

- Feirmeoirí Aontaithe na hÉireann
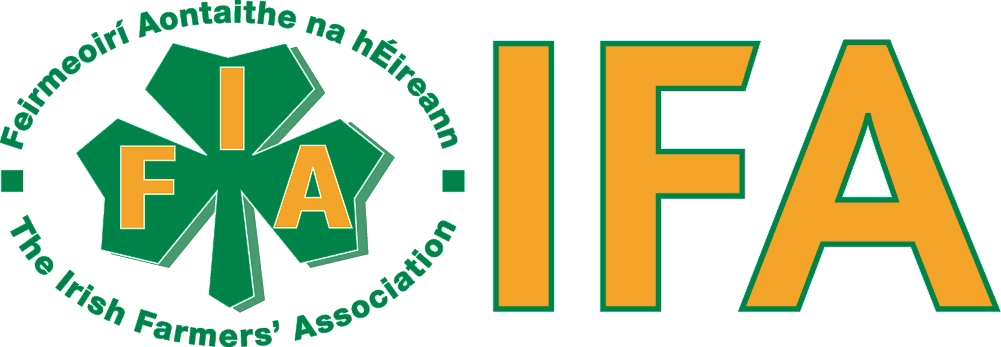
- Founded: 1955
- Headquarters: Irish Farm Centre, Bluebell, Dublin
- Location: Ireland
- Members: 72,000
- Website: www.ifa.ie

The Irish Farmers' Association (IFA) (Irish: Feirmeoirí Aontaithe na hÉireann) is a national organisation to represent the interests of all sectors of farming in Ireland. The IFA is Ireland's largest farming representative organisation and has operated for more than 60 years.

The IFA represents Irish farmers at home and in Europe, lobbying and campaigning for improved conditions and incomes for farm families. It also provides representation, support and advice to members on an individual basis.

IFA is a democratic association, organised in branches, county executive and national committees.

The IFA's head office is at the Irish Farm Centre, in Bluebell, Dublin. It also maintains 12 regional offices and an office in Brussels.

== History ==
=== Foundation as the National Farmers' Association ===
The organisation was founded in January 1955 as the National Farmers Association (NFA), aiming to lead Irish farmers out of the economic depression and deprivation experienced by rural Ireland for decades.

=== Merging of organisations ===
The NFA merged in the 1960s with four smaller organisations representing specific sectors (including Leinster Milk Producers (now Fresh Milk Producers), beet growers and horticulture) to form the Irish Farmers Association – the IFA.

=== Engagement with Europe ===
In the 1972 referendum on Irish membership of the European Economic Community, the IFA campaigned for a "yes" vote, seeking access to European markets and higher prices for agricultural produce.

The IFA denounced the European Union–Mercosur Free Trade Agreement as a "disgraceful and feeble sell-out".

=== Salary controversy ===
In November 2015, Eddie Downey (President) and Pat Smith (General Secretary) resigned due to a salary controversy. Smith's salary in 2013 had been €535,000. He resigned on 18 November. A week later, members of the organisation's national executive council were informed that Smith had been given €2m in severance and €2.7m in pension. Eddie Downey admitted he had signed off on this agreement and resigned. Downey was earning €147,000 a year plus €50,000 in add-ons when he resigned.

The IFA confirmed that former chief economist Con Lucey—who had attempted to raise concerns over financial issues and transparency before quitting under duress in 2014—would oversee a review of salaries and expenses.

== List of presidents ==
Name	Year	Origin
Juan Greene	1955–1962	County Kildare
Rickard Deasy	1962–1967	County Tipperary
T. J. Maher	1967–1976	County Tipperary
Paddy Lane	1976–1980	County Clare
Donal Cashman	1980–1984	County Cork
Joe Rea	1984–1988	County Tipperary
Tom Clinton	1988–1990	County Meath
Alan Gillis	1990–1994	County Kildare
John Donnelly	1994–1998	County Galway
Tom Parlon	1998–2002	County Offaly
John Dillon	2002–2006	County Limerick
Padraig Walshe	2006–2010	County Laois
John Bryan	2010–2014	County Kilkenny
Eddie Downey	2014–2015	County Meath
Joe Healy	2016–2020	County Galway
Tim Cullinan	2020–2024	County Tipperary
Francie Gorman	2024–present	County Laois
