= List of crossings of the Shannon =

This is a list of crossings of the River Shannon, in Ireland (including bridges, tunnels, ferries and fords), from its source in the Shannon Pot to the Shannon Estuary where the river widens before it flows into the Atlantic Ocean. Bridges not primarily intended for public use but which have limited access (generally only in the daytime and only for bicycle and foot traffic) are not included.

== Crossings ==
Key to heritage status
Status	Criteria
NIAH	Rated as a structure of National heritage by the National Inventory of Architectural Heritage
NIAH (Regional)	Rated as a structure of Regional heritage by the National Inventory of Architectural Heritage
RPS	Listed on the Record of Protected Structures of the named city or county council

Crossings in order from source to mouth
Crossing	Date	Coordinates	Heritage status	Locality	Notes	Image
The source of the River Shannon		54.23475°N 7.919°W	-	Shannon Pot	Included for completeness	A small body of water surrounded by foliage
Bradán Feasa footbridge		54.2346°N 7.9195°W	-	Shannon Pot, County Cavan	Footbridge, built by the OPW, which crosses the infant Shannon about 20 meters downstream from the Shannon Pot	An iron pedestrian bridge with the gaelic term "Failte" above it
Dowra bridge	1862	54.1896°N 8.0141°W	NIAH (Regional)	Dowra, County Cavan	Last crossing above Lough Allen. Carries the R200 between Counties Cavan and Leitrim.	A grey road bridge with three arches
Bellintra bridge		54.0610°N 8.0598°W	-	Derrynadooey, County Roscommon	First crossing below Lough Allen. Carries a local road (L33783 off the R280) between Counties Roscommon and Leitrim. Above sluice gates operated by the ESB Group.	A narrow road bridge above a weir
Galley Bridge		54.0549°N 8.0680°W	-	Aghafin, County Roscommon/Mahanagh, County Leitrim	Carries the R280 between Counties Roscommon and Leitrim. Situated just upstream of the site of the former Cavan and Leitrim Railway bridge.	
Battlebridge		53.9964°N 8.0786°W	-	Battlebridge, County Roscommon/Drumhierny, County Leitrim	Carries the R284 between Counties Roscommon and Leitrim.	
Hartley bridge	1915	53.9672°N 8.095°W	-	Cleaheen County Roscommon, 6 km west of Cootehall/County Roscommon, 3 km north of Carrick on Shannon, County Leitrim	Carries a minor road between Counties Roscommon and Leitrim. Leitrim County Council has plans to replace the bridge before 2030.	A humpback bridge with 5 visible supports
Carrick Bridge	1846	53.943°N 8.0958°W	NIAH (Regional)	Carrick-on-Shannon, County Leitrim	Carries the N4 from through Carrick-on-Shannon crossing between Roscommon and Leitrim. Replaced an earlier bridge.	A Humpback bridge with 5 arches
Drumsna Railway Bridge	2009	53.906°N 7.9928°W	-	Lough Tap, Border of Co. Roscommon & Leitrim	Carries the Dublin–Sligo railway line between Counties Roscommon and Leitrim over Lough Tap. Links Dromod and Carrick-on-Shannon railway stations. Replaced existing bridge dated from 1862.	
The Jamestown Canal bypasses a non-navigable section of the River Shannon between Jamestown and Drumsna
X X
main Shannon crossings
Jamestown Bridge	c. 1846	53.9235°N 8.0298°W	NIAH (Regional)	East of Jamestown, County Leitrim	First of two bridges carrying the L3656 from Jamestown to Drumsna through the northern tip of County Roscommon	
Drumsna Bridge	1800s	53.9248°N 8.0113°W	NIAH (Regional)	Southwest of Drumsna, County Leitrim	Second of two bridges carrying the L3656 from Jamestown to Drumsna through the northern tip of County Roscommon	a stone bridge viewed from the bank
X X
Jamestown canal crossings
Unnamed Jamestown Canal Bridge (1)		53.9185°N 8.0317°W	-	County Roscommon, 1 km south of Jamestown, 2 km South West of Drumsna, both in County Leitrim	Carries a minor road from the L3656 Jamestown/Drumsna Road to the L1405 Drumsna/Strokestown Road	
Corry Bridge Jamestown Canal	c.1850	53.9127°N 8.0183°W	NIAH (Regional)	Corry, Co. Roscommon	Carries the L1405 from the L3656 Jamestown/Drumsna Road towards Strokestown	a stone bridge, viewed from the river below
The Jamestown canal rejoins the Shannon at Lough Nanoge
Roosky Bridge	1840-1850	53.8326°N 7.9187°W	NIAH (Regional)	Roosky, Co. Roscommon	Carries the R371 between Counties Roscommon and Leitrim through Roosky.	a view over a river bridge to a hotel on the opposite bank
Tarmonbarry Bridge		53.7421°N 7.9176°W	NIAH (Regional)	East of Tarmonbarry, Co. Roscommon	Carries the N5 between Counties Roscommon and Longford.	a view from a bridge through metal railings to the river below
Bord na Móna rail bridge		53.7006°N 7.9848°W	-	c.2 km North of Lough Ree Power Station, Lanesboro	Private. Narrow-gauge railway line, used to transport peat from bog to nearby power station.	
Lanesboro bridge	1835 – 1843, 1971	53.6743°N 7.9926°W	NIAH (Regional)	Lanesboro	Last crossing above Lough Ree. Links the twin towns of Lanesborough, on the County Longford (east) side and Ballyleague, on the County Roscommon (west) side of the river.	a view of a multi span bridge from a boat
Cumann na mBan Bridge	1991	53.4322°N 7.9558°W	-	North of Athlone	First crossing below Lough Ree. Carries the M6/N6 Athlone bypass. Previously known as the 'Athlone Relief Road - Shannon Bridge' & 'bypass bridge', renamed in 2015, with a ceremony held in June 2017	
White Bridge	1850	53.4272°N 7.9459°W	NIAH	Athlone	Situated c.200 m west of Athlone railway station. The Dublin–Westport/Galway railway line diverges c.200m west of the bridge	a view from a bank of a white bridge, with a boat in the foreground
Mary O'Rourke Bridge	August 2023	53.424331327303°N 7.942520174507595°W	-	Luan Gallery, Athlone	Cycle/Pedestrian Bridge. Carries the Dublin-Galway Greenway from the Radisson Hotel to the Luan Gallery. In spring 2019 the tendering was projected to be completed by 2020. Opened in August 2023. Renamed after Mary O'Rourke in May 2026.	
Road Bridge Athlone		53.4237°N 7.9419°W	-	Athlone	Carries Custume Place (the R446, the old N6 Dublin - Galway Road). Links Athlone Castle and St. Peter and Paul's Church to the Eastern/Leinster side of Athlone	a view over a river, of a castle, a stone bridge, and a church in the background
bridge to Long Island (West bank only)		53.378085°N 7.9188077°W	-	Long Island, Leamore, County Roscommon	Private local road. Links Long Island to the west bank.	
Shannonbridge	completed in 1757	53.2797°N 8.0509°W	NIAH	Shannonbridge, County Offaly	Carries R357 from Shannonbridge to County Roscommon	a multi-span bridge over a wide river
Banagher bridge	1841–1843 (widened 1971)	53.1934°N 7.9926°W	NIAH	Northwest of Banagher	Carries the R356 between Counties Offaly and Galway.	a multi-span bridge over a wide river with a boat in the foreground
Meelick weir pedestrian bridge	2019-2020	53.174902°N 8.075972°W	-	Meelick Weir, Galway/Offaly border	Cycle/pedestrian bridge. Carries the Beara-Breifne Way near Victoria Lock over the existing weir to an island in the river. At 300m, it is the longest pedestrian bridge on the island. Construction, by Waterways Ireland, began in March 2019, and the bridge opened in December 2020 (before being temporarily closed in January 2021 due to COVID-19 restrictions).	(The bridge rests on this weir.)
Portumna bridge	1911	53.0911°N 8.1938°W	-	East of Portumna	Last crossing above Lough Derg. Carries the N65 between Counties Tipperary and Galway. Connects Lehinch island to both banks.	a view of a wide, low bridge
Killaloe Bridge	c.1770	52.808115°N 8.439110°W	NIAH (Regional) RPS Clare CC & Tipperary CC	Between Ballina, County Tipperary and Killaloe, County Clare	First crossing below Lough Derg. A single lane road bridge linking Counties Tipperary and Clare	A mist covered stone bridge
Brian Boru Bridge	2025	52.7999147757052°N 8.436787240512189°W	-	Between Ballina, County Tipperary and Killaloe, County Clare	Opened in 2025 to ease traffic congestion in Ballina and Killaloe. 1 km downstream from the aforementioned Killaloe Bridge. A large modern road bridge linking Counties Tipperary and Clare	
The Ardnacrusha power plant headrace canal splits off from the Shannon c.4 km south of Killaloe
X X
main Shannon crossings
O'Briensbridge (Shannon)	1780 - 1810	52.7522°N 8.4985°W	NIAH (Regional)	East of the village of O'Briensbridge, Co. Clare	Carries the R466 from O'Briensbridge, Co. Clare into Montpelier, County Limerick. Replaced former bridge around 1750, partially replaced in 1842, and modified to include a navigation arch in the 1920s.	a long stone bridge with 12 low arches
The Blackwater distributary river splits off to the west from the Shannon at Drumeen
X X
main Shannon crossings
The Living Bridge	2007	52.6768°N 8.5702°W	-	University of Limerick main campus	Pedestrian bridge. Links the main campus on the south bank (in County Limerick) to student residences on the north bank (in County Clare).	a view across an angled pedestrian bridge with slanted railings
University Bridge	2004	52.678°N 8.5763°W	-	University of Limerick main campus	Links the main campus on the south bank (in County Limerick) to student residences on the north bank (in County Clare).	a view from a nearby bank of a curved road bridge
Black Bridge/ "Plassey Bridge"	1840s	52.678088°N 8.580037°W	-	Plassey, County Limerick	Pedestrian bridge links Thomond Village, County Clare to the old mill works at Plassey, County Limerick	a view across a pedestrian bridge from a nearby bank
X X
Blackwater River crossings
Errina bridge		52.7331°N 8.5333°W	-	Errina, County Clare	Close to the Ardnacrusha canal (which is (c.100m to the north)).	
bridge at Gillogue		52.6859°N 8.572°W	-	East of Gillogue office park, County Clare	Narrow single lane stone bridge. Unmarked lane.	
The Shannon and Blackwater rejoin at Thomond village
Parteen Railway Bridge	2010	52.6813°N 8.6279°W	-	Thomondgate, County Limerick	Carries the Limerick-Galway railway line. Used until 1980s for Limerick-Claremorris line. Restored in early 2008.	
Athlunkard Bridge	1825 - 1830	52.6812°N 8.6099°W	NIAH (Regional)	Corbally, Co. Limerick	Carries the R463 between Corbally Road on the outskirts of Limerick city and Athlunkard Avenue in Corbally, County Clare.	a five-span bridge
X X
Ardnacrusha headrace canal crossings
canal bridge, O'Briensbridge		52.753°N 8.5068°W	-	West of the village of O'Briensbridge, Co. Clare	Carries the R466 from O'Briensbridge into Bridgetown	
Ardnacrusha power plant	1928	52.705594°N 8.612313°W	-	Southwest of Ardnacrusha within County Clare approximately 1.5 miles (2.4 km) from the Limerick border	ESB Group private property. It is Ireland's largest river hydroelectric scheme.	a birds-eye view of a hydro-electric plant
The Shannon and Ardnacrusha canal rejoin at Thomas Island
The Shannon splits around King's Island in Limerick City with the Abbey river being a distributary branch to the east
X X
Abbey River crossings
Baal's Bridge	1830 - 1831	52.6663°N 8.6202°W	NIAH (Regional)	Limerick	Carries Mary Street from George's Quay on King's Island to Charlotte's Quay on the south side of Limerick city. Replaced (old) Baal's Bridge, erected in c. 16th century, demolished in 1829, and bridges have stood here since at least the 12th century.	A view of a hump-back bridge with a set of commercial buildings on the opposite bank
Bishop O'Dwyer Bridge	1931	52.6694°N 8.618°W	NIAH (Regional)	Limerick	Carries Athlunkard Street from Sir Harry's Mall to the Grove Island Roundabout. Named in honour of Edward O'Dwyer, Bishop of Limerick. Replaced Park Bridge built in 1835.	a view across a humpback road bridge, with a city in the background
Abbey Bridge	1999	52.6666°N 8.6193°W	-	Limerick	Carries Island Road from King's Island to the Milk Market. Named in honour of generations of the fishermen of the river Abbey, after a proposal to name it after Jim Kemmy was rejected.	a low bridge over a small river
Mathew Bridge	1844 - 1846	52.6669°N 8.6237°W	NIAH (Regional)	Limerick	Carries Bridge Street (R463) from King's Island to Rutland Street on the south side of Limerick city.	a mono-chrome photo of citizens sitting on, and looking from a road bridge, with a church in the background
Sylvester O'Halloran Bridge	1987	52.6653°N 8.6238°W	-	Limerick	Pedestrian Bridge from the Potato Market, King's Island to behind the Hunt Museum on the south side of Limerick city.	A view of a pedestrian bridge with the setting sun in the background A blue metal pedestrian bridge extends from a gap in a stone wall
X X
Shannon River crossings at King's Island
Sarsfield Bridge	1835	52.6654°N 8.6303°W	NIAH (Regional)	Limerick	Swing bridge (non-functioning). Originally known as the Wellesley Bridge. Carries the R857 Ennis Road. The Shannon Rowing Club Boat house was based on an island under the bridge until it was damaged by Storm Darwin	a monochrome photo of a building from a bridge with short stone pillers a night-time view of a five-span road bridge, with a building, lit in green, in the background
Thomond Bridge	1840	52.670304°N 8.627174°W	NIAH (Regional)	Limerick	Links Castle Street on King's Island to High Road on the Northwest bank	a view from a building down onto a five-span road bridge a view of a road bridge with a castle on the right bank
The Shannon and Abbey rejoin below Kings Island
Shannon Bridge	1986	52.6623°N 8.6351°W	-	Limerick	Carries the R527 between Farranshore More and Mountkennet. Last bridge in the city and over the Shannon	a view from below of a road bridge with green railings
Limerick Tunnel	2010	52.6552°N 8.6868°W	-	Limerick	Carries the N18, Western part of the Limerick Southern Ring Road.	an emergency exit in a road tunnel
Shannon Ferry	1969	52.6147°N 9.3804°W	-	Killimer, County Clare - Tarbert Island, County Kerry	Ro-ro ferry. Part of the N67	a view of a river-crossing ferry port from the opposite bank
Planned Crossings/Crossings Under Construction
Pedestrian Bridge/walkway Limerick (Note: Name to be determined)	2022 onwards		-	Cleeves factory-O'Callaghan strand Limerick City	Pedestrian Walkway or Bridge (under discussion)	
Pedestrian bridge, city canal, limerick (Note: Name to be determined)	2022 onwards	52.668°N 8.6075°W	-	Park canal limerick, 20 metres west of railway bridge	Pedestrian bridge connecting park	
