= Oilliphéist =

Legendary serpent in Irish folklore

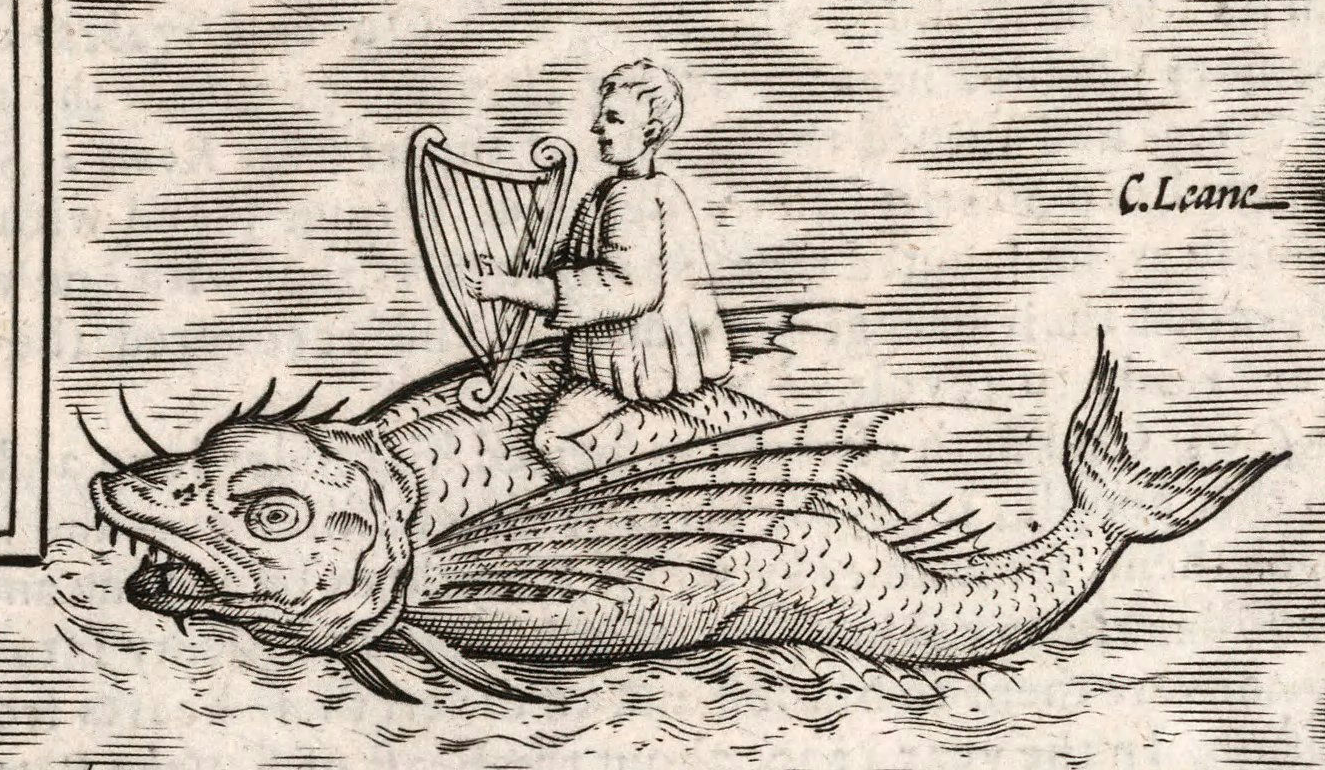
- A sea monster that may have been inspired by the Oilliphéist from John Speed's Province of Mounster map.

Creature information
- Grouping: Sea monster
- Sub grouping: Sea serpent
- Similar entities: Loch Ness Monster
- Folklore: Legend

Origin
- Known for: Creating several bodies of water: River Shannon; Lough Allen; Lough Dearg
- Country: Ireland
- Region: County Leitrim
- Habitat: Shannon Pot, rivers, lakes, and the ocean

The Oilliphéist (Irish: ollphéist, from Irish oll 'great' and péist 'worm, fabulous beast, monster, reptile') is a sea serpent or dragon-like monster in Irish mythology and folklore.

== Mythology ==
These monsters were believed to inhabit many lakes and rivers in Ireland and there are many legends of saints and heroes fighting them.

One story has a girl named Sionnan, grand daughter of Manannán mac Lir, angered the Salmon of Knowledge by throwing stones at it. In revenge the fish summons and asks an Oilliphéist to attack the girl which it does and ultimately ends up killing her.

=== Carving the River Shannon ===
In one story, an Oilliphéist cuts the route of the River Shannon (as well as adjacent lakes) when it hears that Saint Patrick has come to drive out it and its kind. It started its journey in Shannon Pot, then carved out Lough Allen. It then went through Leitrim village and Carrick-on-Shannon, devouring the resident's sheep and cattle. In Jamestown it reached an outcropping of rock and carved around it, forming a peninsula. The Oilliphéist then had to fight a group of enchanted river-eels.

The people near Athleague were angered by the loss of their livestock and took a stand against the beast, led by a drunken piper named O'Rourke (Ó Ruairc). The monster swallows O'Rourke but he survives, continuing to play the pipe inside the Oilliphéist's stomach for several days. The monster becomes so annoyed with Ó Ruairc's music that it coughs him up and spits him out. After being spat up, O'Rourke returned to the spot where he was first swallowed and descended into the water, having been magically charmed by a surviving enchanted eel. He didn't drown, continuing to play his pipes underwater at a spot now known as The Piper's Hole.

The Oilliphéist fought a group of venomous snakes in Lough Ree, where it then rested for several months and demanded offerings from the townsfolk for irrigating the land. It then battled a larger group of venomous snakes and formed Lough Dearg, said to be named for the color of blood spilled in this battle.

In Limerick, near where the Treaty Stone now is, the Oilliphéist did battle with a group of enchanted warriors. The warriors left it for dead but after nightfall the Oilliphéist found the castle they were staying in and pulled it apart, killing everyone inside. When it reached the ocean, it had to do battle with a whale. The Oilliphéist was nearly killed, but a sea-maiden arrived and helped it fend off the whale.

The pair came across a group of fishermen, which the Oilliphéist devoured. The sea-maiden was angered by this and the two fought, with the sea-maiden stabbing the Oilliphéist in the eye with her poisoned comb. In pain, it begged her to kill it, so she stabbed it in the stomach with her scissors. Once the tide had receded and washed the Oilliphéist's body onto the Kerry coast, residents carved it up. They found the fishermen alive, sleeping in their boats within its stomach. The carcass was then salvaged, with the fishermen turning the Oilliphéist's bones into oars.

It is believed by Chris Cairney that this story and one involving Caoránach helped influence and inspire the legend of the Loch Ness Monster.

== Caoránach ==
In Irish folklore, Caoránach (sometimes Caol) was an Oilliphéist and said to be the mother of demons who was banished by Saint Patrick to Lough Dearg in Donegal, Ulster.

According to earlier legends, Fionn mac Cumhaill and the Fianna are asked to slay a Hag in the Lough Dearg region. The Hag is shot and killed from far away, and her body is lost as a result. When the Fianna find her corpse, they are warned to not break its thigh bone lest a dangerous monster be released.

A man named Conan breaks the bone nevertheless, and releases a small hairy worm. The worm, named Caoránach, quickly grows into a large monster which attempts to eat all the cattle in the land. The people of Ulster blame Conan for the deaths of their cattle. Enraged, Conan stabs the monster from within its mouth. Lough Dearg is named after its red rocks, which are said to have been dyed by Caoránach's blood.

In a more Christianised version of the story, Saint Patrick slays the monster after being told about it. Its blood dyes the lake red and in some tales Saint Patrick declares the lake should be called Lough Dearg as a result. In some variants of the tale, Saint Patrick fails to kill the monster, and it lives on in Lough Dearg to this day as a result.

== See also ==
- Muirdris
- Each-uisge
