= Albert Lock =

Canal lock in Ireland

Albert Lock, is a lock on the Jamestown Canal which by-passes an unnavigable section of the River Shannon between Drumsna and Jamestown in Ireland. The canal and lock are located in County Roscommon. The lock dimensions are 102 ft x 30 ft. The Shannon Commissioners constructed the lock in the 1848 as part of a widescale upgrade of the Shannon Navigation.

== Protected Status ==
The lock is listed by the National Inventory of Architectural Heritage (a service provided by the Department of Arts, Heritage and the Gaeltacht) as being of special interest in the architectural, social and technical interest categories.

The Record of Protected Structures lists both the lock and the lock keeper's cottage as protected structures (ref 01200548).
