= Castletown Cox =

Palladian house in County Kilkenny, Ireland

- Interactive map of the Castletown Cox area
- Alternative names: Castletown House

General information
- Status: Private dwelling house
- Type: House
- Architectural style: Palladian, Georgian
- Location: Whitechurch, County Kilkenny, Ireland
- Coordinates: 52.38252°N 7.37141°W
- Named for: Michael Cox
- Construction started: 1767
- Completed: 1774
- Owner: Windham Wyndham-Quin, 4th Earl of Dunraven and Mount-Earl (1909-26); Charles Blacque and family (1926-76); Nicholas Walsh (1976-79); Brian and Ulli DeBreffny (1979-91); George Magan (1991-2019); Kelcy Warren (2019-)

Technical details
- Material: Kilkenny limestone and sandstone
- Floor count: 4

Design and construction
- Architect: Davis Ducart
- Developer: Michael Cox (archbishop of Cashel)
- Other designers: Patrick Osborne (stuccowork)
- Main contractor: John Nowlan (1774)

Castletown Cox, or Castletown House, is a Georgian Palladian mansion and demesne located close to the town of Piltown and Carrick on Suir, in County Kilkenny, Ireland.

The house is often referred to as Castletown Cox to distinguish it from the larger Castletown House in County Kildare, Cox being a reference to Archbishop Michael Cox who built the house.

== History ==
=== Design and construction ===
Davis Ducart designed the house in the Palladian style with a main structure of three storeys over basement and with seven bays as well as extended wings. The design was commissioned by the Lord Archbishop of Cashel, Michael Cox in 1767 and constructed from 1767-71. The 1703 iteration of Buckingham House in London is said to have inspired some of the details.

Ducart is also sometimes ascribed the design of the church in nearby Whitechurch which was also built by Cox in 1766 with the help of £200 from the Board of First Fruits.

=== 18th century ===
On the death of Michael Cox in 1779, the house passed to his only son Richard Cox (died 1790). He had earlier married Mary, daughter of Francis Burton.

On Richard's death, the house passed to his eldest son Michael (born 1768), who married Mary Prittie, daughter of Henry Prittie, 1st Baron Dunalley.

=== 19th century ===
In 1833 William Villiers-Stuart married Catherine Cox, daughter of Michael Cox (born 1768) and sister of Sir Richard Cox, 8th Baronet (died 1846) and they inherited the property.

It is mentioned as being the residence of R. Cox esquire by Samuel Lewis in 1837.

The house later passed to William's son Henry John Richard Villiers Stuart on William's death in 1873 while his wife Catherine died in 1879.

=== 20th century ===
From at least 1909 until 1921, Windham Wyndham-Quin, 5th Earl of Dunraven and Mount-Earl and Lady Eva Wyndham-Quin lived at Castletown.

In October 1921, they sold a selection of contents of the house at an auction with Battersby & Company.

In 1926, when Colonel Wyndham-Quin succeeded to the title from Windham Wyndham-Quin, 4th Earl of Dunraven and Mount-Earl, he sold the house to the Blacque family and moved to the family seat at Adare Manor. The house later passed down to Charles Blacque.

In 1976, Blacque sold the estate to Nicholas Walsh, who never moved into the property.

Brian Michael Leese (styled 'DeBreffny') later purchased the property from Walsh in 1979 and lived there with his wife Ulli until 1991.

In October 1991, a further sale of many of the contents was carried out by Christie's for the new owner George Magan, Baron Magan of Castletown.

=== 21st century ===
The house was extensively restored in the early 21st century by George Magan, Baron Magan of Castletown.

The house and 513 acres of land was offered for sale in 2017 and sold in 2019 for approximately €20m to Kelcy Warren.

In 2019, Lord Magan was evicted from Castletown Cox for failure to make rental payments of €100,000 per annum to the trust he had placed the estate into.

== The estate ==
The formal gardens were designed by the Dowager Marchioness of Salisbury, Mollie Cecil (née Wyndham-Quin).

The National Inventory of Architectural Heritage lists the grounds as having the main features substantially present. Also listed on the estate are two gate lodges of special architectural interest, one a gothic styled three bay home from 1911, the other a two bay home c 1825. Both gateways from c 1825 are also listed as being of special artistic and architectural interest. The farmyard, farm managers house and remains of an ice house are all listed as being of special architectural interest.

== See also ==
- Bessborough House
