= Michael Cox (archbishop of Cashel) =

Michael Cox (2 November 1689 – 28 May 1779) was an Anglican archbishop in Ireland during the 18th century. He is now chiefly remembered for building one of Ireland's most magnificent remaining mansions, Castletown Cox, near Carrick-on-Suir. A younger son of Sir Richard Cox, 1st Baronet, Lord Chancellor of Ireland from 1703 to 1707, and his wife Mary Bourne, he was born in Cork. He was educated at Kilkenny College and Christ Church, Oxford and ordained in 1713. He became Chaplain to Charles Butler, 1st Earl of Arran, then Rector of Calan and Chancellor of Kilkenny. In 1743 he became Bishop of Ossory; and in 1754, Archbishop of Cashel. In 1755 he was made a member of the Privy Council of Ireland.

He was married (possibly a second marriage) in 1744 to Anne O'Brien, daughter of James O'Brien (1695-1771) and his wife Mary Jephson, and granddaughter of William O'Brien, 3rd Earl of Inchiquin and his wife Mary Villiers. She died the following January, aged 22, giving birth to their only son. The marriage though short-lived is said to have been happy, and he did not remarry.

He spent his last years building a magnificent mansion, Castletown Cox, in south County Kilkenny. Designed by the Sardinian-born architect Davis Ducart, it was completed in 1776. It still exists and was extensively restored in the early 2000s by its then owner George Magan, Baron Magan of Castletown.

The Archbishop died in 1779, aged ninety, and was buried beside his wife in St. Canice's Cathedral.

== Notes ==
Church of Ireland titles
Preceded by Anthony Dopping	Bishop of Ossory; 1743–1754	Succeeded by Edward Maurice
Preceded by John Whitcombe	Archbishop of Cashel; 1754–1779	Succeeded by Charles Agar
