= Athlone Railway Bridge =

Coordinates: 53.4272°N 7.9459°W

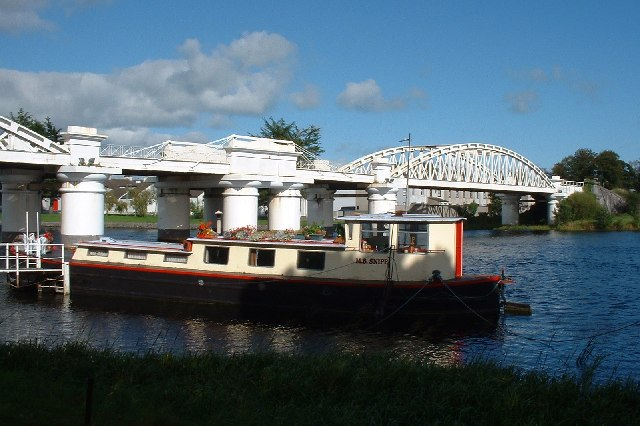
- View of the bridge
- Carries: Trains
- Crosses: River Shannon
- Locale: Athlone
- Other name(s): White Bridge
- Heritage status: Listed in NIAH
- NIAH Number: 15004129
- Followed by: Custume Bridge

Characteristics
- Design: Viaduct
- Material: Steel
- Total length: 542 feet (165 m)
- No. of spans: 6
- Piers in water: 4

Rail characteristics
- No. of tracks: 1
- Track gauge: 1,600 millimetres (63 in)

History
- Designer: G.W. Hemans
- Constructed by: Messrs. Fox and Henderson
- Construction start: c. 1850
- Opened: c. 1851
- Inaugurated: 21 July 1851

The Athlone Railway Bridge, also known as the White Bridge, is a railway bridge over the River Shannon at Athlone, Ireland.

== History and Technical Details ==
The bridge was built in 1851 and took 18 months to complete. The bridge is 542 feet (165 m) long. It was designed by G.W. Hemans, and built with a central span which can be opened to accommodate tall sailing craft. The iron-work was shipped to Limerick and then was transferred to Athlone by barge. The twelve cylindrical pillars are each 10 ft (3.0 m) in diameter. The opening central span is 120 ft (37 m) in length, but this was changed to a fixed section in 1972.

The bridge is listed in the National Inventory of Architectural Heritage under number 15004129.
