= John Whitcombe =

Irish bishop (died 1753)

John Whitcombe, D.D. (died 22 September 1753) was an Anglican bishop in Ireland in the 18th century.

Whitcombe was educated at Trinity College, Dublin after which he became Chaplain to the Duke of Dorset then Rector of Louth. He was consecrated Bishop of Clonfert and Kilmacduagh in January 1735; and was also appointed in commendam to Kilfenora in 1742. In 1752 he was translated to Down and Connor and finally to the Archbishopric of Cashel later that year.

He died on 22 September 1753.

Church of Ireland titles
Preceded by Mordecai Cary	Bishop of Clonfert and Kilmacduagh; 1735–1752	Succeeded by Arthur Smyth
Preceded by Edward Synge	Held in commendam the Bishop of Kilfenora; 1742–1752	Succeeded by Nicholas Synge
Preceded by John Ryder	Bishop of Down and Connor; 21 March 1752 – 1 September 1752	Succeeded by Robert Downes
Preceded by Arthur Price	Archbishop of Cashel; 1752–1753	Succeeded by Michael Cox
