= Edward Maurice =

Irish Anglican bishop

Edward Maurice was an Anglican bishop in Ireland, Bishop of Ossory from 1755 to 1756 He was educated at Trinity College, Dublin, after which he was Rector of Armagh. He died on 11 February 1756.

== Notes ==
Church of Ireland titles
Preceded by Michael Cox	Bishop of Ossory; 1755–1756	Succeeded by Richard Pococke
