= Shannon Cave =

Cave in the island of Ireland that feeds Shannon Pot

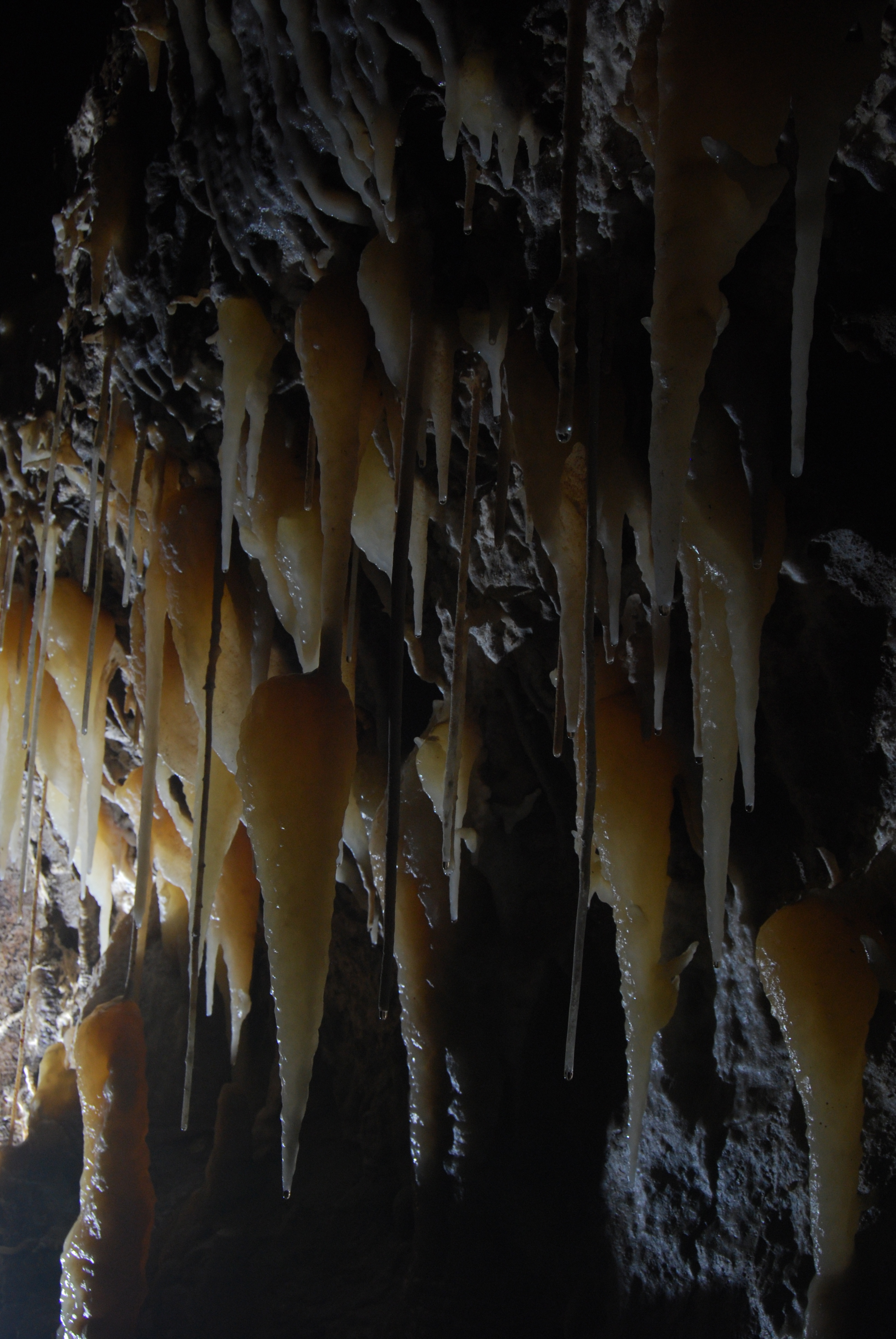
- The Vegetable Patch formations
- Interactive map of Shannon Cave
- Location: Cuilcagh mountains, County Fermanagh, Northern Ireland and County Cavan, Republic of Ireland
- Coordinates: 54°14′26″N 7°50′53″W
- Depth: 130 m (430 ft)
- Length: 5.4 km (3.4 mi)
- Discovery: 1980
- Geology: Limestone
- Entrances: 1
- Entrances list: Polltullyard; Pollahune (collapsed)
- Difficulty: High
- Hazards: Vertical pitch; rock falls; boulder chokes
- Access: With experienced guide only
- Associated caves: Polltullyard, Pigeon Pot, Shannon Pot

Shannon Cave is an active stream passage cave which straddles the border of County Fermanagh, Northern Ireland and County Cavan in the Republic of Ireland.

At 130 metres (430 ft) vertical depth, it stands joint sixth with Poulnagree in County Clare in the deepest caves on the island of Ireland. The cave is recorded at 5.4 kilometres (3.4 mi) in length (making it the sixth-longest on the island of Ireland), but exploration is ongoing and further passage is expected to be found.

== Description ==
The cave consists in the main of a large mainstream passage running to a terminal sump. The water flowing in the cave has been dye traced to Shannon Pot, two kilometres to the west of the terminal sump, which is the traditional source of the River Shannon. Inlets to the main passage are numerous. Some, such as the large "Mistake Passage" have been pushed only a short distance. Since the cave is undergoing active exploration, there remain many issues to be sorted out and the sinks for many of these inlets remains unclear. The stream passage itself is of considerable proportions in parts, but also contains many higher level fossil passages which have been deserted by the stream. The cave contains numerous calcite formations, with large amounts of helictites in places. Boulder chokes are frequent with several parts of the cave being quite unstable, especially the JCP passage.

== Location ==
While the location of the entrance to the cave is in County Fermanagh, the majority of the cave lies under County Cavan. The original entrance to the cave was in Cavan; however, this is now inaccessible. The current entrance of Polltullyard is located north of the Marlbank area of Fermanagh, high in the moors.

== Exploration history ==
=== 1980s: Discovery and initial exploration ===
The cave was discovered in August 1980 by members of the Reyfad Group, the cavers' collective responsible for exploring the Reyfad system. The entrance was made in a shakehole adjacent to the sink point of the Hune (pronounced "honey") stream, and close the border in County Cavan. This entrance became known as "Pollahune". The initial route was dug through a highly unstable area of glacial fill, making it extremely treacherous. Once in the cave the cavers encountered a "main" streamway into which the Hune flowed, with the upstream section leading to "JCP Passage" and the downstream section passing another significant inlet, "Mistake Passage". By the end of August, the team had progressed past several boulder chokes and explored cave passages some 1.6 kilometres (1 mi) in length.

Downstream, the team reached a terminus at a prominent boulder choke, through which they attempted to dig. In October 1980 a section of the choke collapsed on Rev. George Pitt while he attempted to force a passage at river level. He became trapped for 10 hours, but was freed after a major rescue effort. By 1990 the explorers had passed the newly named George's Choke. The end of the cave was reached, 400 metres (1,300 ft) downstream, at the terminal sump (sump 3) beneath another large boulder choke, and the extension to this point was named "The Mayfly Extension".

While discoveries were being made in Shannon Cave in 1980, attention was also being paid to a large doline less than a kilometre away in County Fermanagh. Members of the Reyfad Group (including the aforementioned Rev. Pitt) and the Irish Caving Club worked together to dig their way into passage leading to a 30-metre (98 ft) underground shaft, with boulder chokes and crawls at its base. They named this cave Co-operation Pot in honour of their collaboration, but later the name Polltullyard, after the local townland, was adopted.

=== 1990s–2000s: Pollahune collapse and new entrance ===
The Pollahune entrance to Shannon was always dangerous, often dumping rocks on passing cavers and finally in 1995 it collapsed, making the cave inaccessible. During subsequent years attention was turned to Polltullyard, the downstream end of which lay within 60 metres (200 ft) of upstream JCP Passage, according to the surveys. Various groups of cavers attempted to dig through the terminal boulder choke, but none were successful in stabilising the passage. In 2004 cavers from the Shannon Group began in earnest to attempt to re-enter the system, and initiated a new dig in the direction of Shannon Cave. By 2005 Shannon Cave had been re-entered via a very tight section of passage named the "Rebirth Canal". The cavers had regained JCP Passage, and access to the rest of the cave as far as George's Choke, which had collapsed again as reported by cavers on the last trip into Shannon Cave. In 2007, after two years' work digging and stabilising, George's Choke was passed. The explorers reached the terminal sump, the first people to do so in twelve years.

=== 2008: Saint Patrick's Extension ===
A new dig began on a balcony above the terminal sump, attempting to push a route through the boulder choke, but progress was slow and the choke proved unstable. In early 2008 a team of British cave divers were invited over to dive the sump, now named "Young, Free and Desperate". After 40 metres (130 ft) the divers emerged at the far side of the choke and made a voice connection with the dry cavers on the other side. After exploring downstream for one kilometre they returned to help dig from the other side of the choke. A connection was made a week later, after a further dive. 1,300 metres (4,300 ft) of cave was surveyed beyond the choke. This began with a short stretch of passage leading to sump 4, which was then bypassed from above, leading to 450 metres (1,480 ft) of unbroken canyon passage. The extension eventually terminated at a new terminal sump. The new section was named "St. Patrick's Extension", and the canyon passage named "Paddy's Parade". The sump, number 5 in the system, was named "Long Way From Home".

"Downstream of sump 4 the streamway comprises c. 450 m of fine canyon passage. ... [It] is perhaps one of the grandest sections of canyon passage in Ireland but on a striking scale. The passage is about 1–2 metres wide and ranges from 8 to 14 metres in height. There is also evidence of old high-level passage with a few rift/high level passage leads."

=== 2009: Easter Extension ===
Methodical exploration of high-level leads in St. Patrick's Extension in 2009 led to the discovery of a tight cross-rift intercepting a section of "Paddy's Parade" at right-angles. The dry, tightly meandering rift, the "Snake Escape", was followed for 30 metres (98 ft) to a 10-metre (33 ft) upward pitch, from the top of which led 70 metres (230 ft) of crawling passage to a number of deep pitch heads. The last of these pitches was found to take a small stream, which was followed at the base of the pitch to a sump. Although it has not been traced, it is likely that this stream joins the main Shannon Cave watercourse further downstream of the Snake Escape.

Upstream, beyond the pitches, a further 150 metres (490 ft) of active stream passage was followed upstream to a sump. The total surveyed length of all branches in the extension came to 635 metres (2,083 ft).

== In Media ==
A 12 minute VR documentary starring Pam and Tim Fogg based on a LiDAR point scan of the descent into Poltullyard was premiered at IDFA 2023 The experience is based on a series of still scenes rendered using proprietary point cloud technology on Unity and runs on the Quest 2.
