= Drumsna =

Village in County Leitrim, Ireland

Drumsna Droim ar Snámh
- Village
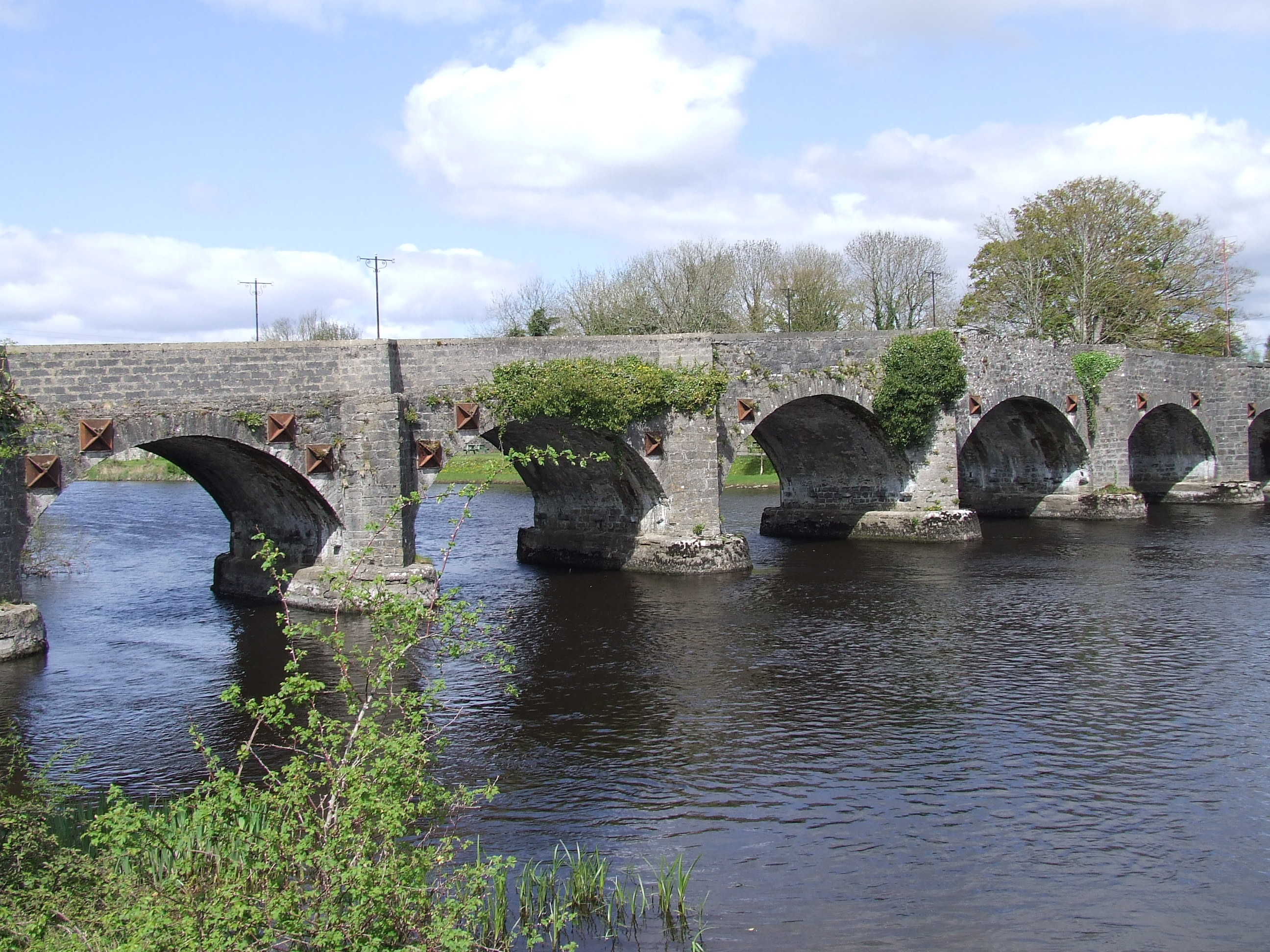
- Stone bridge at Drumsna (May 2010)

- Location in Ireland
- Coordinates: 53°55′33″N 8°00′34″W
- Country: Ireland
- Province: Connacht
- County: County Leitrim
- Elevation: 40 m (130 ft)

Population (2022)
  - Total: 268
- Time zone: UTC+0 (WET)
  - Summer (DST): UTC-1 (IST (WEST))
- Irish Grid Reference: N000982
- Website: www.drumsna.com

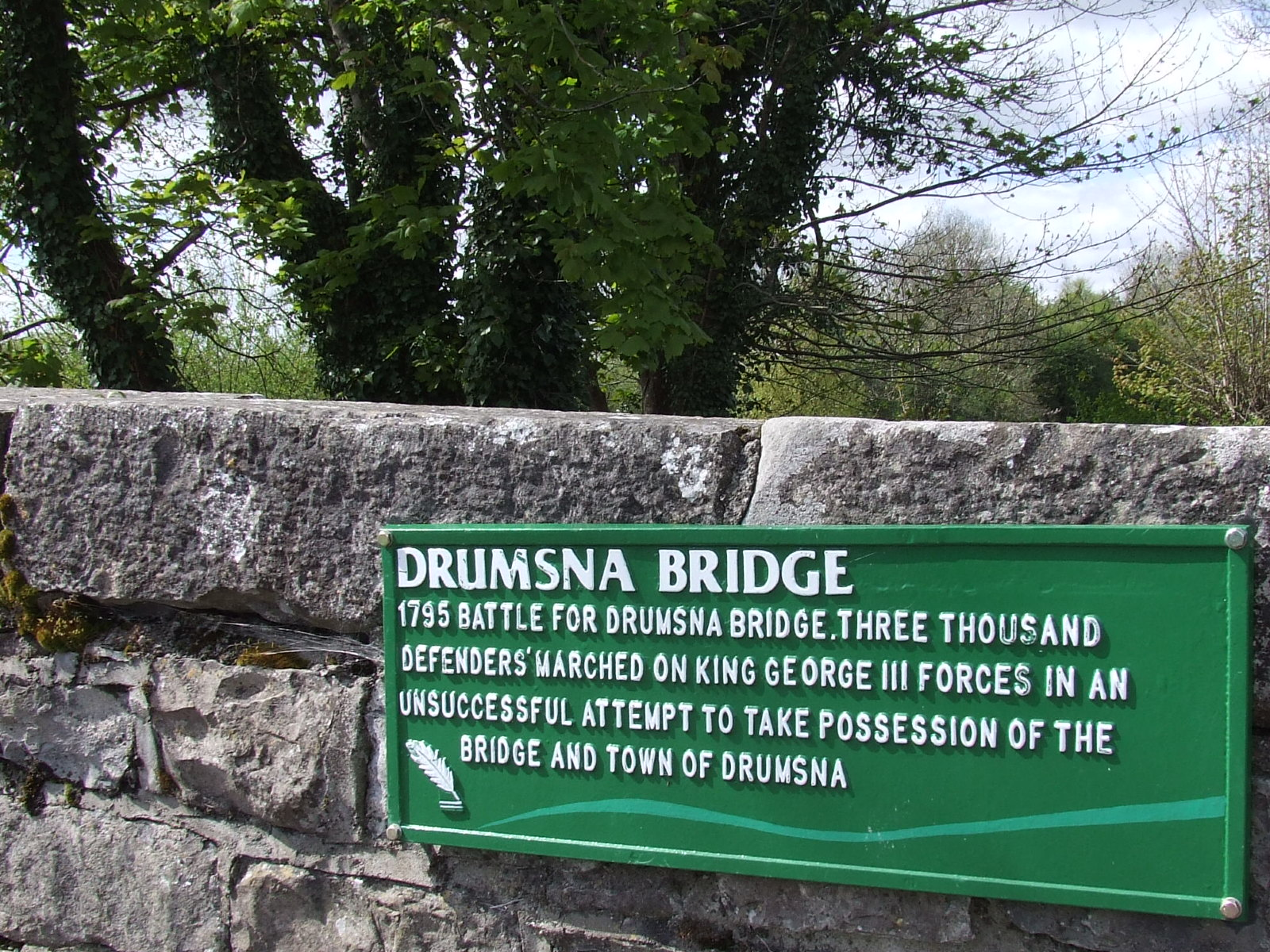
Plaque on bridge commemorating the 1795 rebellion

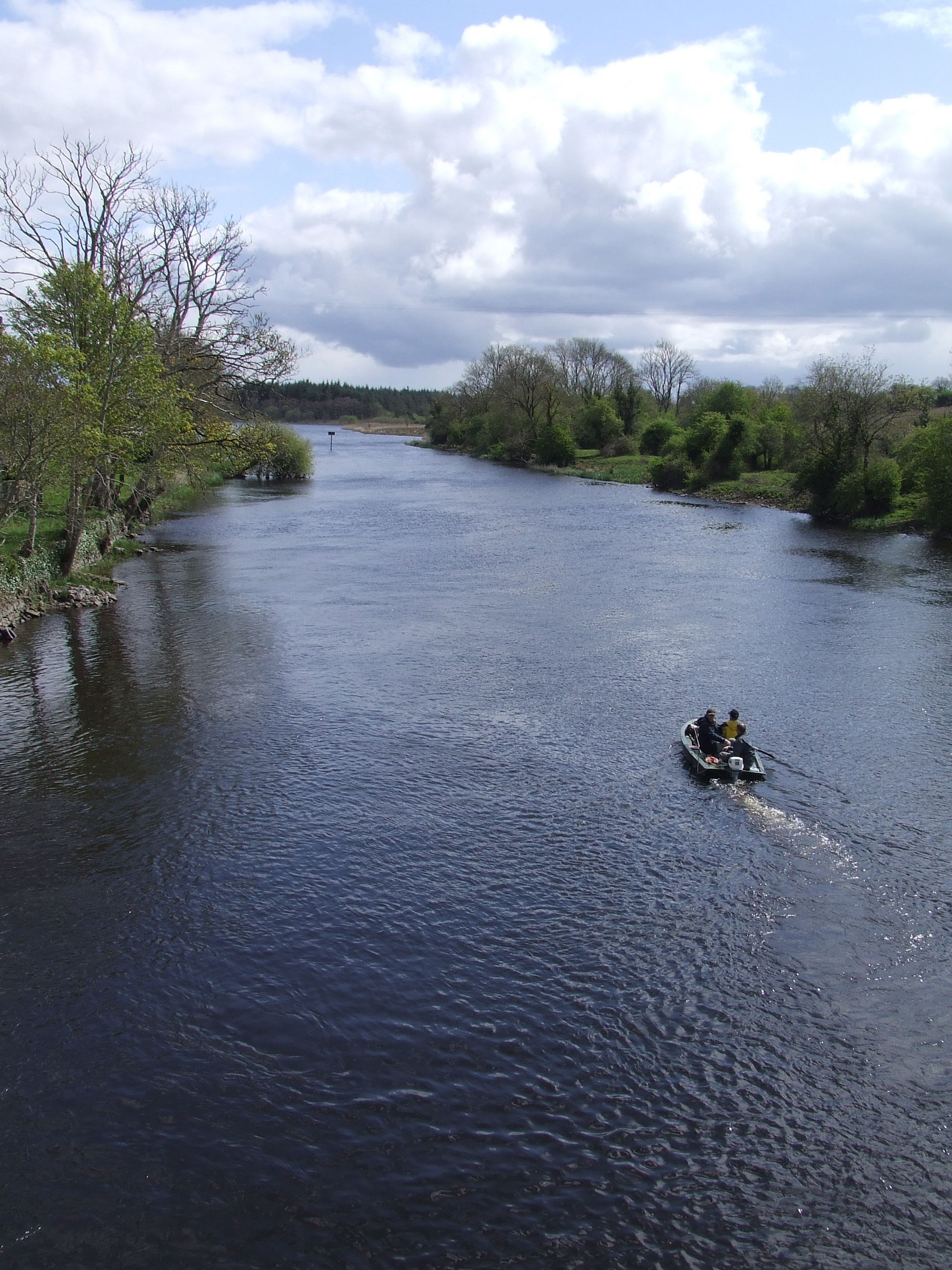
River Shannon from Drumsna bridge (May 2010)

Drumsna (Irish: Droim ar Snámh which translates as the back of the swimmer) is a village in County Leitrim, Ireland. It is situated 6 km east of Carrick-on-Shannon on the River Shannon and is located off the N4 National primary route which links Dublin and Sligo. The harbour dates to 1817 and was a hive of commercial waterway activity until the more northern navigation canal to Carrick-on-Shannon was opened in 1850. Today, the waterway is used by anglers and tourist vessels in the summer months.

== History ==
One ancient way of crossing a river was swimming - "ag Snámh" in Irish.

The oldest known name for Drumsna is "Snamh-Rathainn", which appears in the Irish Annals at 1148AD. It is mentioned again at 1261AD when the "fortress" of Hugh O’Conor, king of Connacht, at Snamh-in-redaigh was burned. (Note: In 1261AD Drumsna is called "Snam Muredaig" in the Annals of Ulster, and "Snam in Redaigh" in both the Annals of Lough Ce and Four Masters.) John O'Donovan states it is "probably Drumsna, on the Shannon, on the borders of Leitrim and Roscommon".

In 1552, Ferdorcha MagRaghnaill of Muintir Eolais was the Irish chieftain over Drumsna.

In the 19th century, the skull of a small ancient Irish elk was found in the Shannon, at Drumsna Bridge.

In the late 19th century, Drumsna was the main trading town in Leitrim with its own jail and courthouse. It was the resting place for horse-drawn carriages and the harbour was a thriving delivery port. In 1850, the construction of the Jamestown Canal led to a change of the Shannon navigation which altered the status of Drumsna.

Throughout at least the 19th and 20th centuries, a number of annual fairs were held at Drumsna on- 20 May, 22 June, 25 August, 7 October, and 13 December. There was a Chalybeate Spa near the village in the 19th century. In 1925, Drumsna village comprised 35 houses, 5 being licensed to sell alcohol.

Ashfort House, near Drumsna, was originally the home of the Caulfield family. It was purchased by the Waldrons of Cartron in 1744. It was here in January 1848 that Hubert Kelly Waldron JP was murdered in a non-political incident when the local coroner attempted to serve him with a writ.

Until 1996 the main N4 Dublin to Sligo road passed through the village which was then bypassed.

== Amenities ==
=== Angling ===
The unpolluted lakes and rivers in the Drumsna area support a huge population of wild fish, and it is a base for angling. Coarse fish species include bream, roach, rudd, hybrids, tench, pike, perch and eels. The Shannon flows through the village and there are several good fishing lakes close by. The Shannon has bream, rudd, roach, tench, perch and pike. Lough Aduff just outside the village is home to bream, roach and tench. Headford is a small lake located about 1½ mile northeast of the village of Drumsna, this lake has a stock of bream to 3 lb (1.4 kg) and some good tench fishing can be had here, especially during the summer months.

=== Drumsna Roman Catholic Church ===
Built in 1845 and part-financed from the proceeds of a trip to Rome by the then Parish Priest, Father George Geraghty, the building has one of the largest church bells in the country. The church also contains a statue to the Virgin Mary which was the only surviving item from Belmount House when it was destroyed by fire.

== Transport ==
Drumsna railway station opened on 1 September 1863, and finally closed on 17 June 1963. It is connected to the Dublin-Sligo railway line, across the Drumsna railway bridge.

Drumnsa lies beside the River Shannon with its own jetty. It is a common stopping point for boats though navigation for cruisers is not possible upstream of here. Boats are required to use the Albert Lock and Jamestown Canal which links to the Shannon upstream of Jamestown, County Leitrim.

== Townlands ==
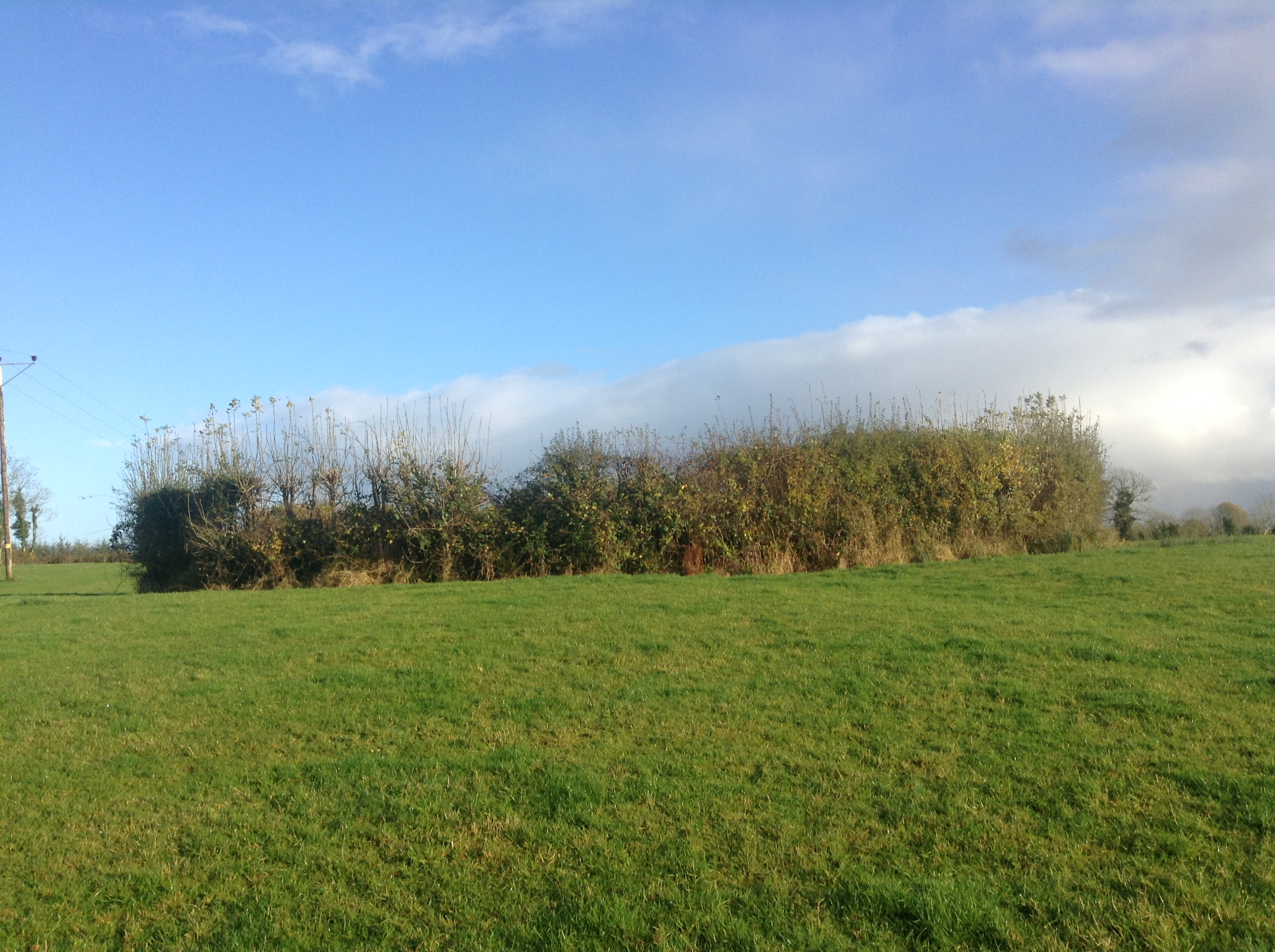
Mullaun Ringfort, Drumsna; c. 16m in diameter

Townlands around Drumsna, all within Drumsna electoral division, include:

- Annaduff
- Crickeen
- Gortconnellan

== People ==
- Admiral Sir Josias Rowley, 1st Bt., GCB, GCMG, RN (1765–1842).
- Rear Admiral Samuel Campbell Rowley (1774 - 1846). Represented the constituency of Kinsale in the last Irish Parliament before the union with Great Britain and was subsequently elected to the Westminster Parliament, where he served until 1806. Younger brother of Josias Rowley.
- The writer Anthony Trollope (24 April 1815 – 6 December 1882), lived in the village for a period during the 1840s, where he wrote The Macdermots of Ballycloran. Anthony Trollope was remembered in the village with the launch of the Historic Trollope Trail by President Mary McAleese in September 2008.
- Robert Strawbridge (1732–1781), one of the pioneers of Methodism in the United States, was born in Gortconnellan, Drumsna. The Wesleyan historical society erected a memorial to Robert Strawbride in Drumsna in 1992.
- Thomas Heazle Parke, African explorer and surgeon (1857–1893), was born in Clogher House, Drumsna, Co Roscommon.

== See also ==
- List of towns and villages in Ireland

== References and notes ==
=== Sources ===
- Wright, G.N. (1834). A new and comprehensive Gazetteer; being a delineation of the present state of the world, from the most recent authorities; arranged in alphabetical order, and constituting a systematic course of geography (PDF). Vol. IV. London: Thomas Kelly, Paternoster Row.
- Longman (2011) [1819]. Traveller's New Guide Through Ireland, Containing a New and Accurate Description of the Roads (digitized from original in Lyon Public Library ed.). Longman. Archived from the original on 15 July 2020.
- Watsons (1830). The Gentleman's and citizen's almanack ... for the year (PDF). Dublin, Printed for S. Watson [etc.]
- Irish Free State (1925). Intoxicating Liquor Commission Report (Report). Vol. Reports of Committees. The Stationery Office. Archived from the original on 15 December 2018.
- "Droim ar Snámh". logainm.ie. Archived from the original on 13 November 2018.
- O'Donovan, John, ed. (1856). Annála Rioghachta Éireann. Annals of the Kingdom of Ireland by the Four Masters ... with a Translation and Copious Notes. 7 vols. Translated by O'Donovan (2nd ed.). Dublin: Royal Irish Academy. CELT editions. Full scans at Internet Archive: Vol. 1; Vol. 2; Vol. 3; Vol. 4; Vol. 5; Vol. 6; Indices.
