= Archaeological Survey of Ireland =

Irish historic database

The Archaeological Survey of Ireland is a unit of the National Monuments Service, which is currently managed by the Department of Housing, Local Government and Heritage. The unit maintains a database of all known archaeological monuments and sites in Ireland that date from before 1700 with few selected monuments of the post-1700 period. The database has more than 138,800 records related to archaeological monuments.

The Archaeological Survey of Ireland was founded first in 1930 by the National Monuments Advisory Council when the National Monuments Act 1930 came into effect. A central archive was established in 1933 under the direction of the Inspector of National Monuments, Harold G. Leask, to collect published materials about all archaeological sites and monuments. After refounding the Archaeological Survey of Ireland in 1963, field surveys began with County Louth in 1965. The compilation of the Sites and Monuments Record (SMR) started in 1982 with per-county lists that were completed in 1992. These lists were later used for the statuary Record of Monuments and Places (RMP) that was established by the National Monuments (Amendment) Act 1994, consisting of brief per-county lists and associated maps.

In 1982, the Commissioners of Public Works decided to publish a series of archaeological inventories, designed to be comprehensive listings of all sites but providing only very brief summaries. The inventories came with the hope to raise awareness for the monuments to defend against the increasing destruction of vulnerable sites. The series started in 1986 with County Louth. Currently, it consists of 21 volumes, covering, at least partially, 16 of the 26 traditional counties of the Republic. In a subsequent phase, a series of much more detailed archaeological surveys was to be published. Currently, only one such volume, covering County Louth, was published by the government in 1989 that was inspired by the previously published archaeological surveys for two Ulster counties: County Down (1966) and County Donegal (1983).

The SMR dataset can be accessed through the Historic Environment Viewer that supports also the data from the National Inventory of Architectural Heritage (NIAH) of the post-1700 heritage. The dataset has been released under the Creative Commons Attribution 4.0 International licence which, however, does not cover third party materials like the maps of the Ordnance Survey Ireland.

== See also ==
- Northern Ireland Sites and Monuments Record
