= Jamestown Canal =

Canal in County Roscommon, Ireland

Coordinates: 53°55′N 8°02′W

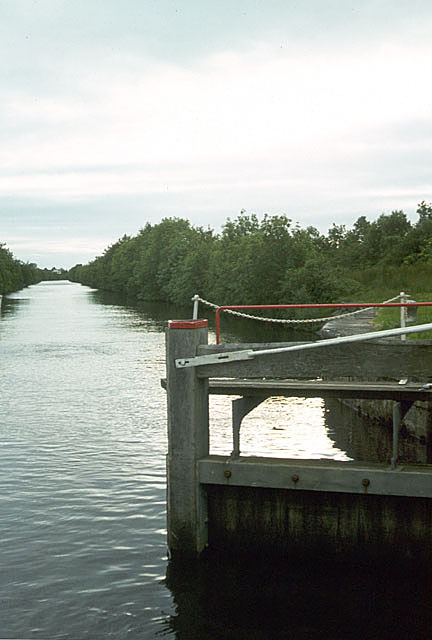
- Interactive map of Jamestown Canal

Specifications
- Length: 2.6 km (1.6 miles)
- Locks: 1
- Maximum height above sea level: 46 m (151 ft)
- Status: Open

History
- Date of act: 1697
- Date of first use: 1799
- Date extended: 1848

Geography
- Start point: River Shannon (Ardnafron)
- End point: River Shannon (Lough Nanoge)

The Jamestown Canal (Irish: Canáil Chill Srianáin) bypasses a non-navigable section of the River Shannon between Jamestown and Drumsna in Ireland. The canal is 2.6 km in length and is located in County Roscommon. The Shannon Commissioners constructed the canal in 1848 to replace an earlier, smaller canal as part of a widescale upgrade of the Shannon Navigation.

== Structures associated with the canal ==
The following associated structures are listed as being of architectural social and technical interest on the National Inventory of Architectural Heritage.

- Albert lock (1848) and lock keepers cottage.
- Jamestown Canal Bridge, rusticated bridge with a single span over the canal, built about 1850.
