= Ardnacrusha =

Village in County Clare, Ireland

Ardnacrusha Ard na Croise
- Village
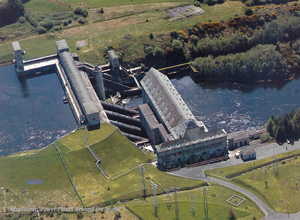
- Ardnacrusha Power Plant

- Location in Ireland
- Coordinates: 52°42′30″N 8°36′44″W
- Country: Ireland
- Province: Munster
- County: County Clare

Population (2022)
  - Total: 1,229
- Time zone: UTC+0 (WET)
  - Summer (DST): UTC-1 (IST (WEST))
- Irish Grid Reference: R583618

Ardnacrusha (Irish: Ard na Croise) is a village in County Clare, Ireland, located on the northern bank of the River Shannon. By road, it is 6.6 kilometres (4.1 mi) north of Limerick. The name derives from the phrase Ard na Croise meaning "the height of the cross", due to a large cross marker placed there in 1111 to mark the boundary of the Diocese of Limerick. At the 2022 census, the population of the village was 1,229.

Ardnacrusha is located near the site of the Ardnacrusha power plant, constructed in the 1920s. By 1935, it was producing 80 per cent of Ireland's electricity.

== See also ==
- List of towns and villages in Ireland
