= Plassey, County Limerick =

Area of Limerick, Ireland

Plassey is an area of Limerick City in Ireland. Plassey, an alternative name for the townland of Sreelane, is located three miles east of Limerick city in the parish of Kilmurry, County Limerick.

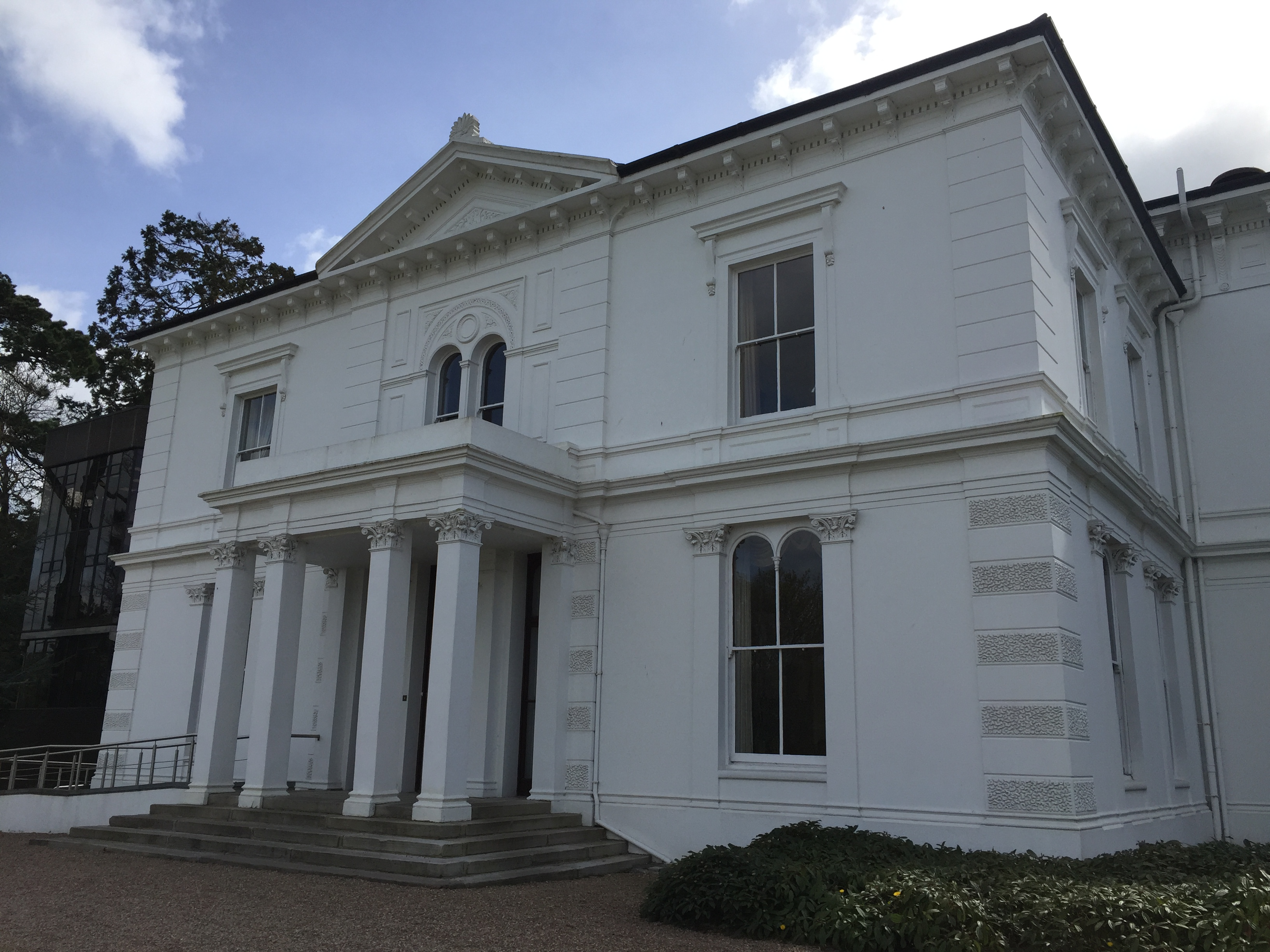
Plassey House at the University of Limerick

In 1762, the townland was purchased by Thomas Maunsell (1726-1814), an East India Company officer who had served under Robert Clive at the battle of Plassey in Bengal. Having amassed a large fortune in India, he returned to Ireland and soon after purchased land including Sreelane. There he built a three-bay two-storey house over basement and named it and the lands Plassey. Contrary to popular myth, the land was never owned by Clive. On Maunsell's death, Plassey House and the demesne surrounding it, which included a mill, passed through the marriage of his daughter to Robert Hedges Maunsell. In the 1830s, Ruben Harvey, a successful miller, purchased Plassey. About 1860, the house, mill and lands were acquired by Richard Russell (1803-71), a prominent Limerick city businessman, who transformed the Georgian block into an Italianate-style house by extending it westwards with two recessed blocks each of two-stories and two bays. In about 1908 the house and lands were sold to William Bailey, who owned a rubber plantation in Malaysia. Following the death of Bailey's widow in 1933, the house was acquired by Patrick Keating, a retired British Colonial civil servant.

In 1961 Keating sold Plassey to the National Rehabilitation Institution. In January 1970 the house and lands were transferred to the National Institute for Higher Education, Limerick, which later became the University of Limerick. The University of Limerick has its main campus in the area. Today, Plassey House serves as the University's administrative centre.

The Black Bridge in the grounds of Plassey House crosses the Shannon from Limerick (Mill Side) into County Clare.
