= Luan Gallery =

- Dánlann Átha Luain

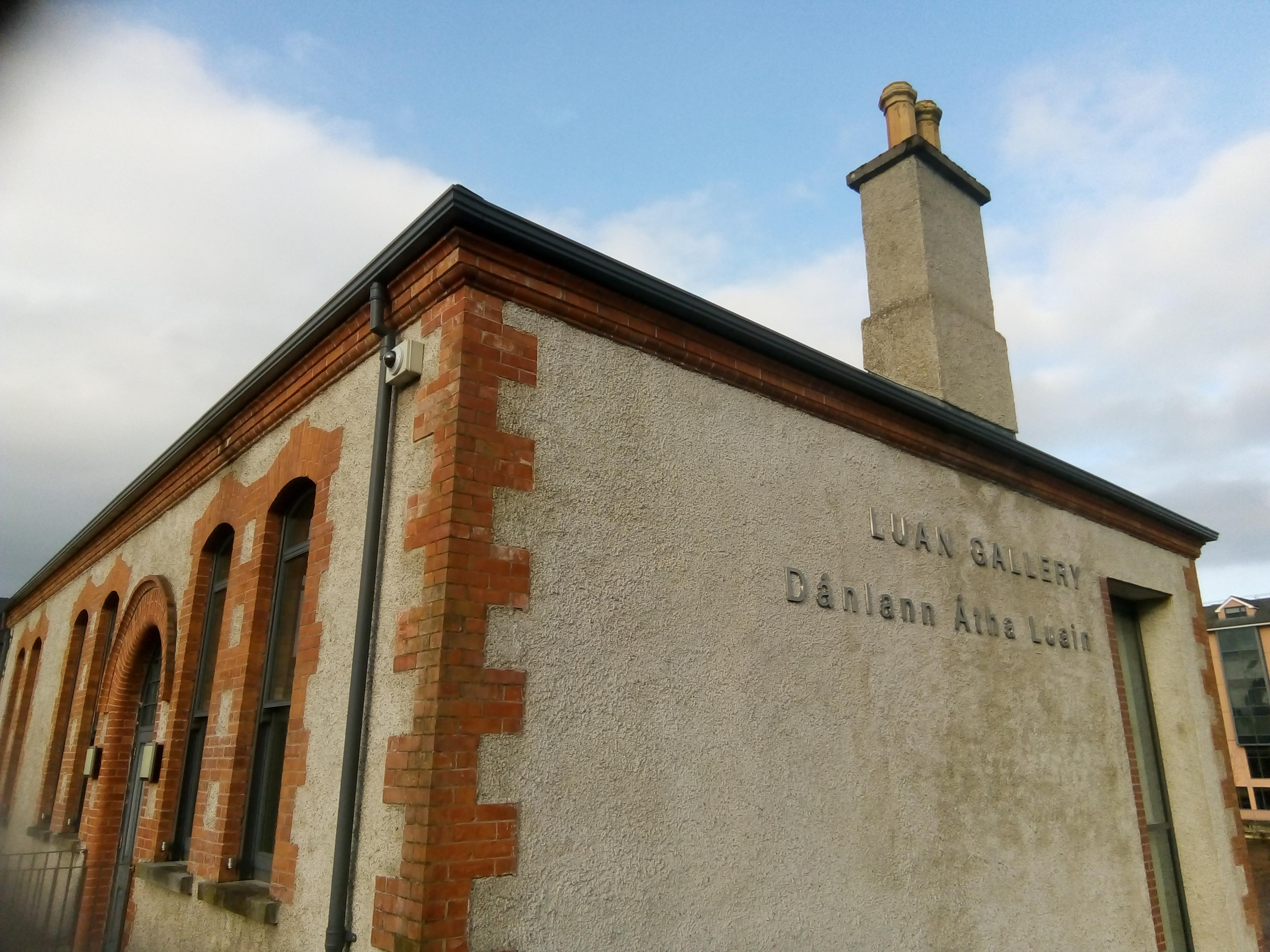
- Luan Gallery in 2018

- Location within Ireland
- Established: 2012
- Location: Athlone, County Westmeath, Ireland
- Coordinates: 53°25′26″N 7°56′34″W
- Type: art gallery
- Public transit access: Connaught Street bus station Athlone railway station
- Website: www.athlone.ie/visit/the-luan-gallery/

The Luan Gallery is a publicly owned art gallery in Athlone, County Westmeath, Ireland.

The gallery opened in 2012, and the building consists of the older part, a former public library built in 1897 as a temperance hall, combined with a newer wing, designed by Keith Williams. The building was named Best Cultural Building of 2013 by the RIAI, and received a Civic Trust Award in 2014.

The gallery takes its name from Luan son of Lugair son of Lugaid, a mythical chief who gives his name to the town.
