= George Magan, Baron Magan of Castletown =

Member of House of Lords

The Right Honourable The Lord Magan of Castletown

Member of the House of Lords
- Lord Temporal
- Life peerage 25 January 2011

Personal details
- Born: George Morgan Magan; 14 November 1945 (age 81) Delhi, India
- Party: Conservative
- Children: 2

George Morgan Magan, Baron Magan of Castletown (born 14 November 1945), is a Conservative member of the House of Lords of the United Kingdom. He comes from an Anglo-Irish family, and is the son of the late Brigadier Bill Magan, who served as a director at MI5. He was educated at Winchester College and then became a Chartered Accountant. He was declared bankrupt in September 2020.

== Legal Issues ==
In 2017, Lord Magan of Castletown obtained a loan from a fellow peer, Lord Ashcroft, to avoid a bankruptcy application in London.

In 2018, he was ordered to pay €572,000 in rent arrears for his use of Castletown Cox in County Kilkenny, Ireland.

In September 2019, Magan was evicted from Castletown Cox for failure to make rental payments of €100,000 per annum to the trust he had placed the estate into, which had sold the property for a reported €19m in 2018. The High Court in Dublin ruled that Lord Magan of Castletown was not entitled to a new tenancy of the Castletown Cox mansion. Unable to pay his lawyers, there was some evidence of a legal move against his residence in London.

In October 2019, the High Court in London sentenced Magan to one week imprisonment, suspended for six weeks, after ruling that he was in contempt of court for failing to provide all the information requested about his finances, adding "His current attitude, that this seems to be a wholly voluntary process, is highly mistaken."

On 8 September 2020, Lord Magan of Castletown was declared bankrupt by the High Court of Justice in London.

In December 2020, Magan lost his appeal in the Irish High Court to overturn his eviction from Castletown Cox. Ms Justice Faherty, on behalf of the three-judge Court of Appeal, dismissed the appeal. She said the defendant had not shown he had a good defence on the merits or had a defence with a reasonable prospect of success.

== House of Lords ==
On 25 January 2011, Magan was created a life peer as Baron Magan of Castletown, of Kensington in the Royal Borough of Kensington and Chelsea, and was introduced in the House of Lords on 27 January 2011, where he sits as a Conservative.

In January 2021, the House of Lords Conduct Committee convened as Lord Magan of Castletown had failed to notify the committee of his suspended sentence of imprisonment in 2019. Lord Mance, Chairman of the House of Lords Conduct Committee, observed that Magan was in breach of the House of Lords Code of Conduct Section 18.

Orders of precedence in the United Kingdom
Preceded by The Lord Kestenbaum	Gentlemen; Baron Magan of Castletown	Followed by The Lord Grade of Yarmouth
