= Shannon Pot =

Pool, traditional source of the River Shannon

- Log na Sionna
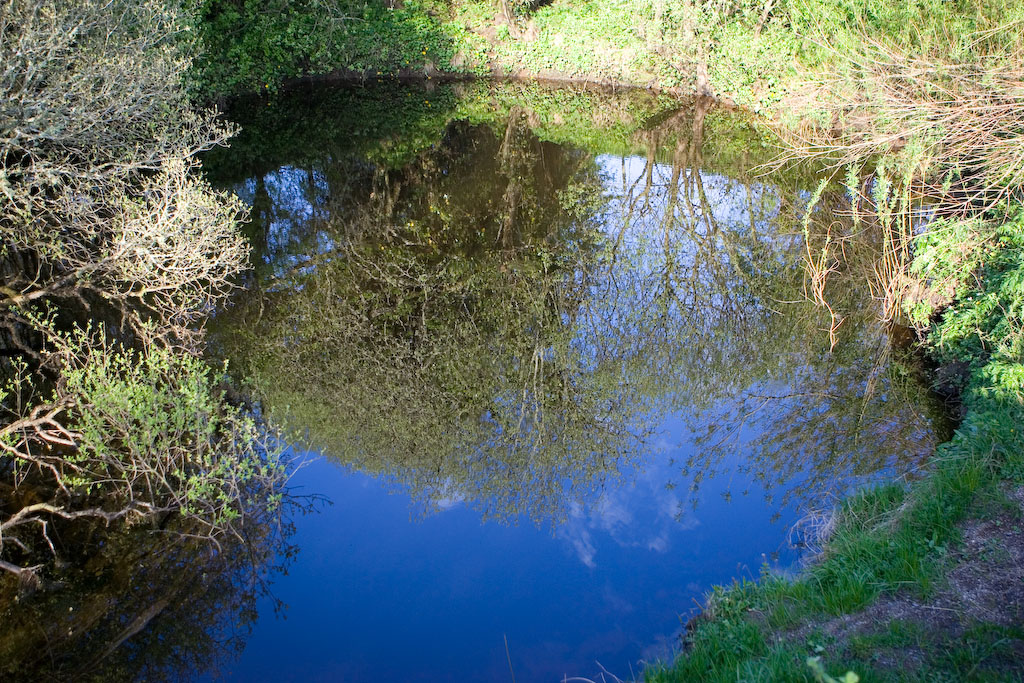

- Location within Ireland
- Location: Derrylahan townland, Glangevlin, County Cavan
- Coordinates: 54.23475°N 7.919°W
- Type: pool
- Primary inflows: Shannon Cave
- Primary outflows: River Shannon
- Catchment area: 12.8 km^{2} (4.9 sq mi)
- Basin countries: Ireland
- Max. length: 16 m (52 ft)
- Max. width: 16 m (52 ft)
- Max. depth: 14.6 m (48 ft)

Shannon Pot (from Irish Log na Sionna, meaning 'hollow of the Shannon') is a pool in the karst landscape in the townland of Derrylahan near Cuilcagh Mountain in County Cavan, Ireland. An aquifer-fed naturally fluctuating pool, it is the traditional source of the River Shannon. It has connections, through the Shannon Cave system, to other pools, including two in County Fermanagh. The pool itself is about 16 metres (52 ft) wide and has been dived to 14.6 m (48 ft) depth. Settlements near the Shannon Pot include Dowra, Blacklion and Glangevlin.

== History ==
There is an early reference to the Pot in the Book of Magauran. Poem X, stanza 2, composed c. 1349 by Giolla na Naomh Ó hUiginn, states, "Innte a-tá an tiobra as dtig Sionann/sruth as uaisle i n-Inis Fháil" ("In it is the well whence comes the Shannon, noblest stream in Inis Fáil").

== Folklore ==
According to legend, the Shannon is named after Sionnan, who was the granddaughter of Manannán mac Lir, the god of the sea. She came to this spot to eat the forbidden fruit of the Tree of Knowledge, which was planted by the druids. As she began to eat it, the waters of the pool sprang up and overwhelmed her. She was drawn down into the pool and its water began to flow over the land, forming the River Shannon.

== Diving and exploration ==
Shannon Pot was first explored by divers Roger Solari and John Elliot on multiple dives in 1971, to a depth of firstly 6 m (20 ft), then 9 m (30 ft). At this point the water was found to emerge from a 2-metre (6.6 ft) wide slit, up to 300 mm (1 ft) in height. Their progress was hampered by submerged tree branches, equipment problems and poor visibility in the dark brown water. The pot was later explored by Martyn Farr, among others, but no further progress was made until the late 2000s.

In December 2008 and January 2009 the pot was dived again by Alasdair Kennedy and Paul Doig, and subsequently by Artur Kozłowski. After widening the slit and continuing downwards past a loose cobblestone slope, Kozłowski discovered an unstable chamber. A strong current was found to emerge from a tight, unstable shaft in the floor. Doig and Kennedy surveyed the chamber to a depth of 14.6 m (48 ft).

== Hydrology ==
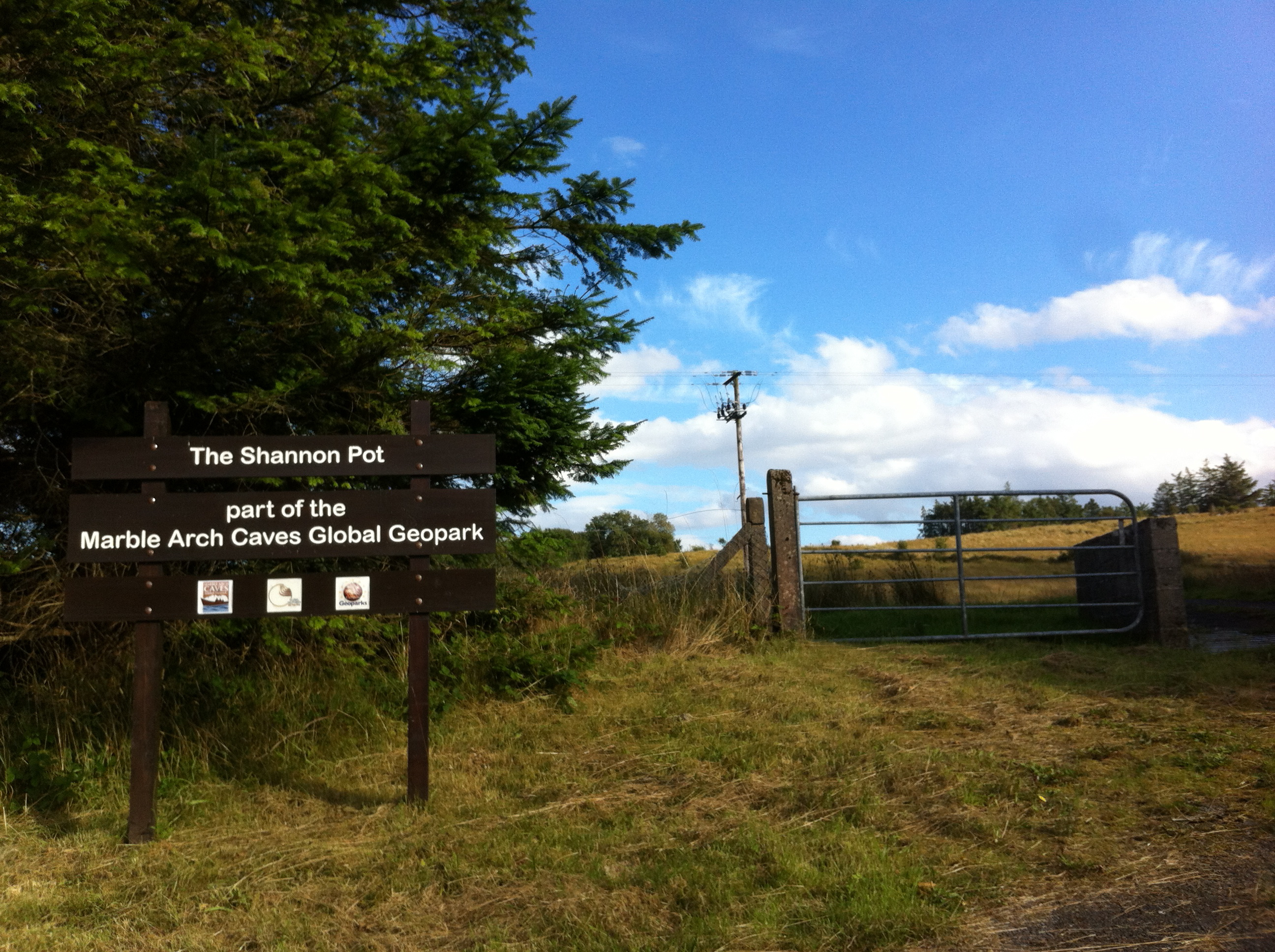
The Shannon Pot is part of Marble Arch Geopark

Surveys have defined a 12.8 km^{2} (4.9 mi^{2}) immediate permanent catchment area covering the slopes of Cuilcagh. This area includes Garvagh Lough, 2.2 km (1.4 mi) to the northeast of the pot. Water from Garvagh drains into the Pollnaowen sink, (Note: 'Poll nm1:' hole, pit, sink, leak, aperture (The Pocket Oxford Irish Dictionary – Irish-English)) before emerging at Shannon Pot. The highest point in the catchment is a spring at Tiltinbane on the western end of the Cuilcagh mountain ridge; this sources an unnamed stream which itself feeds into Shannon Cave. Further sinks that source the pot include Pollboy and, through Shannon Cave, Pollahune in County Cavan and Polltullyard and Tullyrrakeeragh in County Fermanagh. Surveys suggest that Shannon Pot may once have had a much bigger catchment area.

It has been shown that in times of high water flow, the pool is hydrologically linked to Badger Pot and Pigeon Pot, located 10.6 km (6.6 mi) north of the Shannon Pot in the Cuilcagh Mountain area near Florence Court Forest Park, County Fermanagh.

== Proposed discovery centre ==
In July 2023 Cavan Belturbet Municipal Council approved planning permission for the development of a discovery centre.
