= Jamestown, County Leitrim =

Village in County Leitrim, Ireland

Jamestown Baile Shéamais Cill Srianáin
- Village
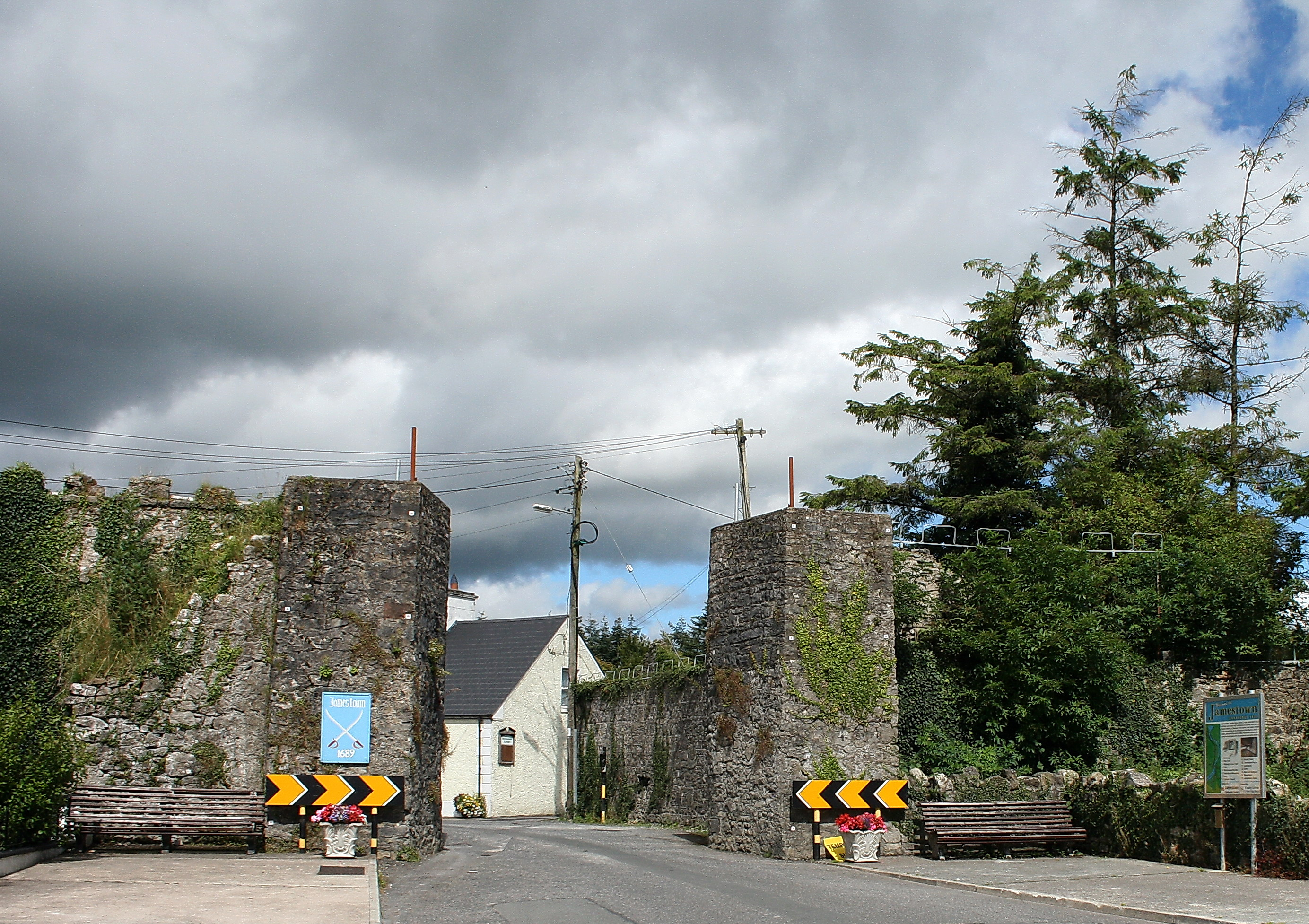
- The headless "arch"

- Location in Ireland
- Coordinates: 53°55′37″N 8°01′46″W
- Country: Ireland
- Province: Connacht
- County: County Leitrim
- Elevation: 40 m (130 ft)

Population (2002)
  - Total: 229
- Time zone: UTC+0 (WET)
  - Summer (DST): UTC-1 (IST (WEST))

Jamestown (Irish: Baile Shéamais) is a village on the banks of the River Shannon in the south of County Leitrim, Ireland. It lies some 5 km south-east of the county town, Carrick-on-Shannon. Historically called Kilshreenan (Cill Srianáin), it was named after King James I of England.

Jamestown was built as a walled town in the 1620s, during the Plantation of Leitrim, for English settlers. It was on the site of an older Irish church settlement. Formerly, the main Sligo to Dublin road (N4) passed through Jamestown, and is known for the narrow old town gate that straddles the road. The arch was damaged by a lorry in the early 1970s and the top was removed. At Christmas, a lighted skeletal arch has been erected by the local community.

Two pubs and a church mark the centre of the village. Jamestown has a quay and is a popular stopping point for boats. Navigation for cruisers is not possible downstream of Jamestown, boats being required to use the Jamestown Canal and Albert Lock, which links to the Shannon south of Drumsna.

== History ==
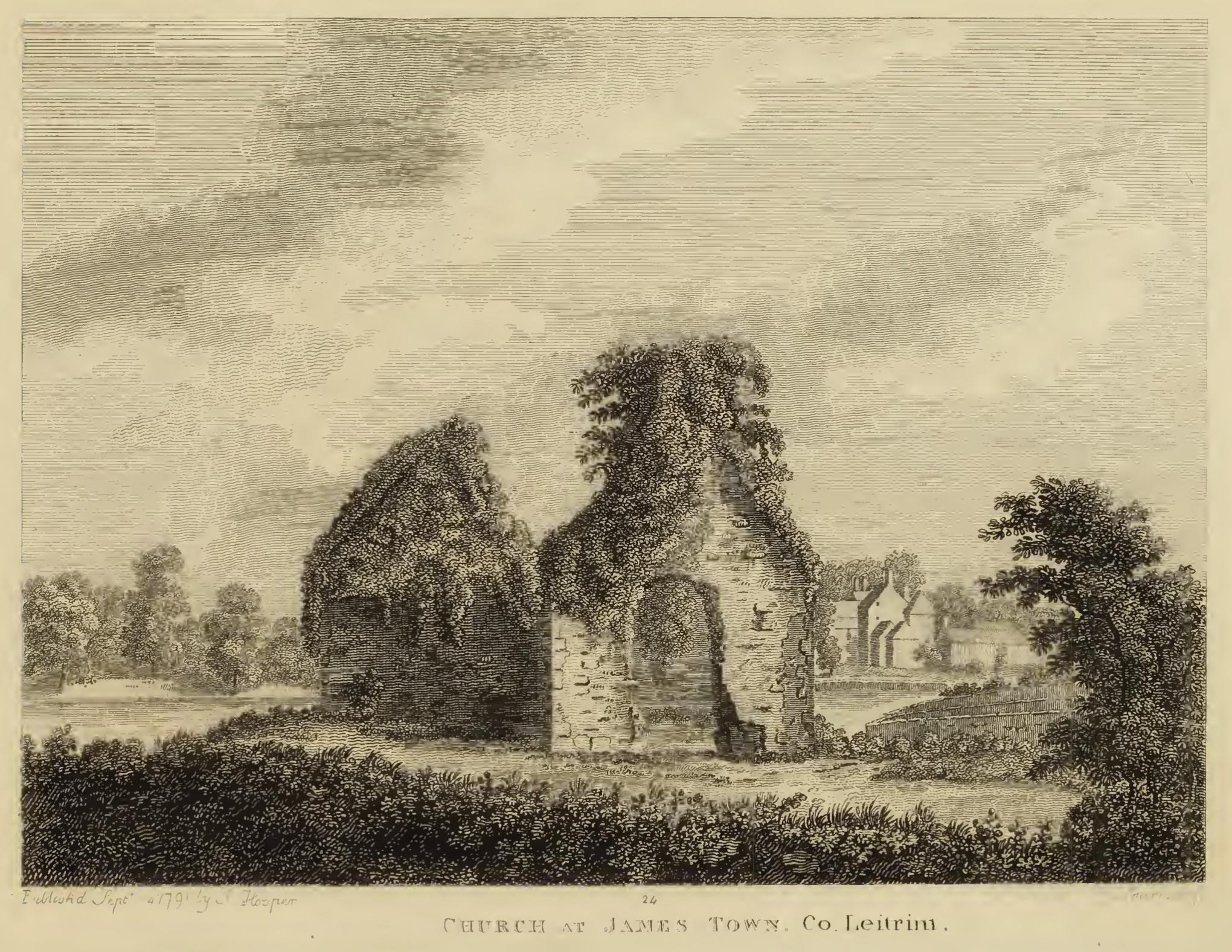
Ruins of Jamestown Friary, 1791

The Plantation settlement was created by Royal Charter from James I in 1621 and was founded in 1622 as a plantation town carrying into action the decision of 1620 to plant County Leitrim with loyal English settlers. It was granted to Sir Charles Coote, a Devonshire Planter, who fortified it with walls twenty feet high and six feet in thickness, enclosing an area of about 4 acres (16,000 m^{2}) which contained a castle. It had an area of 200 acres (0.81 km^{2}) under its liberty.

A stone cross over a small gate (constructed by Murtagh O'Dowd, local blacksmith), outside the old town gate, leads to the remains of a Franciscan friary of the Friars Minor. The Franciscan friary of the Friars Minor was not founded until the occupation of Jamestown in 1642 by the O'Rourke Clan. A synod held here in 1650 repudiated The 1st Marquess of Ormonde, the former Lord Lieutenant of Ireland, and excommunicated his followers. In 1713, an elderly Father Connor Reynolds "of Jamestown in the county of Leitrim" exiled in Spain since 1681, was captured hiding in a trunk on a fishing boat arriving at Dungarvan port and imprisoned at Waterford gaol. The surnames Butler and Clyne are particularly numerous in the Jamestown area.

The parliamentary borough returned two members to the Irish House of Commons on a very restricted franchise until the Act of Union with Britain in 1801. Among its parliamentary representatives were Sir Charles Coote (1634–1660), John Fitzgibbon (1776; he was later elevated to the peerage in 1789, eventually becoming Earl of Clare in 1795), and Richard Martin, "Humanity Dick".

Throughout at least the nineteenth century and for much of the twentieth century, a number of annual fairs were held at Jamestown on 28 May, 8 July, 1 September, and 20 December. In 1925, Jamestown village comprised 15 houses, 4 being licensed to sell alcohol.

== River crossings ==
Both Jamestown and Drumsna have long been important fording places across the Shannon. The present stone bridges were built during the 19th century as part of improvements to the Shannon navigation. The main Dublin – Sligo road ran across these until a bypass was completed in the late 1990s.

== Doon of Drumsna ==
The Dún (Doon) of Drumsna, an Iron Age fortification built as a crossing point into Connacht, lies opposite the quay and runs across the Shannon peninsula between Jamestown and Drumsna. It was one of many linear earthworks built across the country around that time. The main rampart was massive with parts still standing up to 6 metres high and 30 metres across at the base. Additional banks were built on either side of the main rampart which extends for 1.6 kilometres. Two main entrances were built as pincer or Zangentor defensive works.

In addition to the main rampart, a secondary rampart extends upstream along the western river bank where shallows existed.

== See also ==
- List of towns and villages in Ireland
