= National Inventory of Architectural Heritage =

Irish historic database

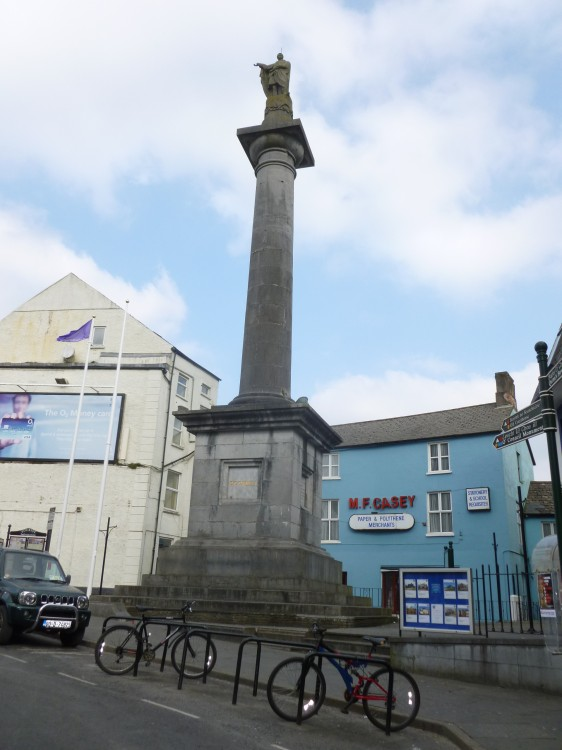
The O'Connell Monument in Ennis, County Clare, is record number 20000001 in the NIAH database

The National Inventory of Architectural Heritage (NIAH) maintains a central database of the architectural heritage of the Republic of Ireland covering the period since 1700 in complement to the Archaeological Survey of Ireland, which focuses on archaeological sites of the pre-1700 period. As of 2022, there were over 50,000 records in the database, including buildings, monuments, street furniture and other structures. It does not cover Northern Ireland.

Buildings recorded in the database may be given a rating, indicating either regional, national or international importance.

== Formation ==
The NIAH is a unit of the Heritage Division within the Department of Housing, Local Government and Heritage.

The unit was founded in 1990 to address the obligations of the Convention for the Protection of the Architectural Heritage of Europe of which Ireland is signatory. Initially, the NIAH existed only on a non-statutory basis with the task to create and maintain an inventory of to be protected buildings and sites. The legal framework for the NIAH was established with the Architectural Heritage (National Inventory) and Historic Monuments (Miscellaneous Provisions) Act of 1999 which introduced access rights to the interior of buildings for the NIAH and preservation obligations for the local planning authorities. The subsequent Planning and Development Act 2000 delegated the responsibility to maintain records of protected structures (RPS) to the planning authorities, leaving the role to identify and document significant objects of architectural heritage to NIAH.

== Operation ==
Surveying started in 1991 and focused first on towns. The first survey was performed in County Clare. Each building covered by one of the surveys is rated on a scale that includes the values "record only", "local", "regional", "national", and "international" where usually objects of at least regional significance are considered for protection. In 2001, then minister Síle de Valera used the result of these surveys to recommend the inclusion of 2,155 buildings in the record of protected structures by the respective planning authorities. As a full survey of the entire country using the same approach as for the town surveys was assumed to take more than 100 years, it was decided to begin with interim county surveys that focused on buildings with at least of regional significance. The surveys were published on CD-ROMs and online. The dataset has been published under the Creative Commons Attribution 4.0 license. In addition, a series of books was published, each presenting the highlights of one of the surveys. As of 2017, 33 volumes were published.

Another surveying project of the NIAH focuses on historic gardens and designed landscapes. These surveys started by comparing the 19th-century maps of the Ordnance Survey against aerial photography and were followed by on-site evaluations. In June 2009, the NIAH won the Europa Nostra Award for this project.

== See also ==
- Record of Monuments and Places
- National monument (Ireland)
- Record of Protected Structures, a list maintained by each city or county council
