= People's Park, Limerick =

Park in Limerick, Ireland

Coordinates: 52°39′30″N 8°37′40″W

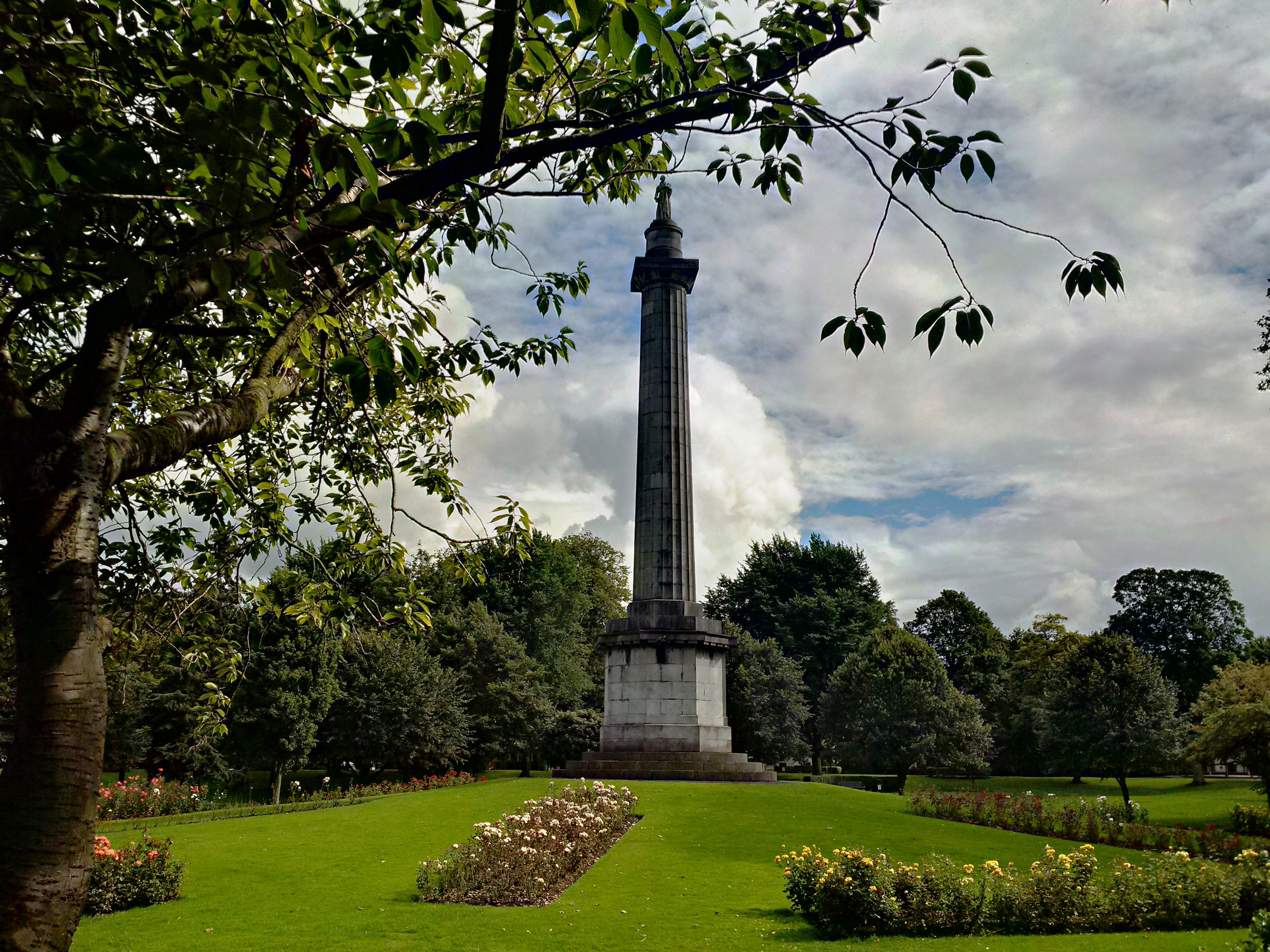
The Rice Monument in People's Park.

The People's Park is a park located by Pery Square in Limerick, Ireland, just west of Limerick Colbert train and bus station. At the northern edge of the park is the Limerick City Gallery of Art.

== History ==
The park was initially developed as part of the Pery Square development in the Newtown Pery area of central Limerick. This development commenced in 1835 and the associated park was a keyholders-only park. The plan was to surround the park with housing for the more affluent members of society. Pery Square was intended to be a complete Georgian square with the Georgian terraces enclosing a central park, similar in layout to Merrion Square or Mountjoy Square in Dublin, albeit more modest in scale. Ireland's Georgian economy began to decline with the onset of the Great Irish Famine and only one terrace of the square was ever completed - funds for the project ran out before this could be completed.

The park was officially opened in 1877; it was given to the People of Limerick in honour of Richard Russell, a prominent local businessman. It was the then Earl of Limerick in the 1870s who granted a 500-year lease of Pery Square and the surrounding grounds to the city's corporation under certain conditions. These included an agreement that no political or religious meetings were allowed to be held in the park and bands were not to play there on a Sunday. The plots of land that were earmarked for the development of the Georgian Square were eventually incorporated into the park and extended it further north to what is now Mallow Street, eastwards towards Boherbuoy Road and southwards towards St. Joseph Street.

== Amenities ==
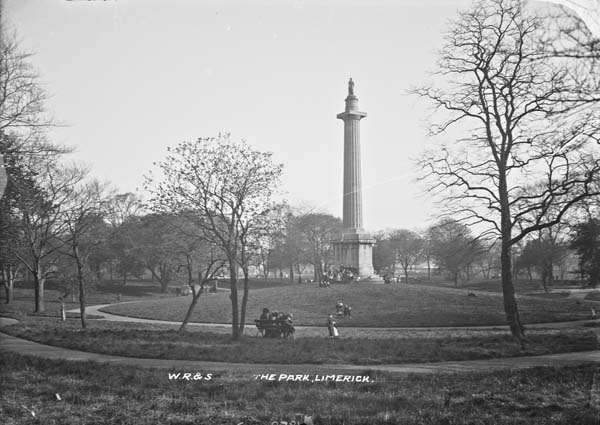
Historic view of park with monument

The park boasts a number of interesting items including a memorial upon a giant pillar to Thomas Spring Rice, MP for the city of Limerick from 1820–1832, a 19th-century bandstand, an ornate drinking fountain (one of only two on the island of Ireland) and two gazebos.

In 2001, a children's playground opened in the park. In April 2022, the playground underwent a significant refurbishment, replacing much of the ageing equipment with modern, interactive equipment. Works finished in September 2023.

A memorial garden to The Little Angels of Limerick opened in 2002.

The Limerick City Gallery of Art's (LCGA) modern-day extension opens into the Peoples Park (its main entrance is on Pery Square) alongside a Zest café located in the art gallery.

Bus Éireann Routes 301, 304A and 306 serve the park on its Mallow Street side and Boherbuoy. Route 303 stops on nearby Parnell Street and Hyde Road.
