= Pery Square =

Georgian square in Limerick, Ireland

- Tontine Terrace
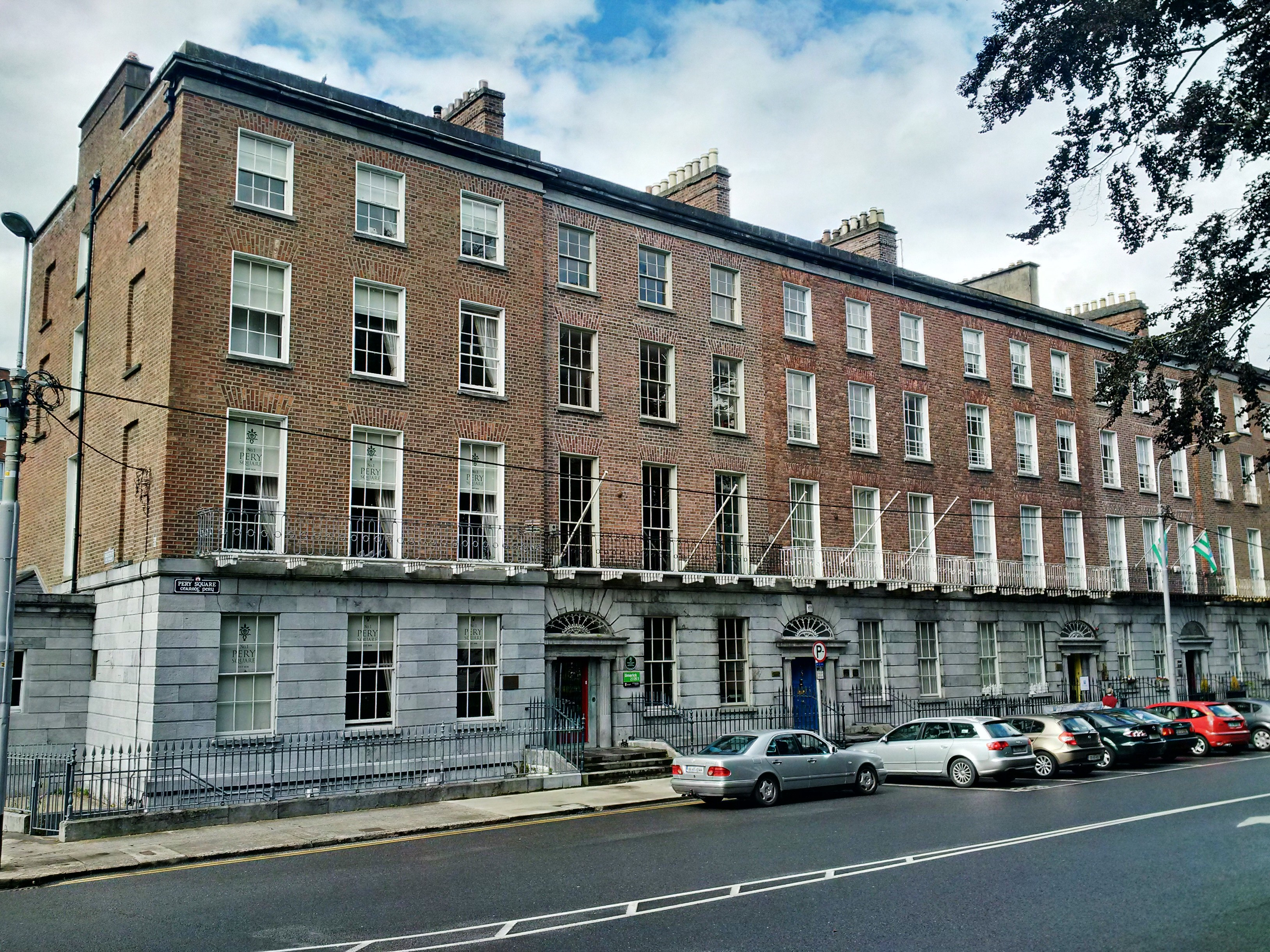
- The Georgian House on Pery square
- Interactive map of Pery Square
- Native name: Cearnóg an Pheirigh (Irish)
- Part of: Newtown Pery
- Namesake: Edmund Pery, 1st Earl of Limerick
- Length: 90 m (300 ft)
- Location: Newtown Pery, Limerick, Ireland
- Postal code: V94
- Coordinates: 52°39′32″N 8°37′44″W
- north end: Upper Hartstonge Street
- west end: The Mews

Construction
- Construction start: 1835
- Completion: 1838

Other
- Known for: Georgian architecture, Limerick City Gallery of Art, St. Michael's Church; The People's Museum of Limerick

Pery Square (Irish: Cearnóg an Pheirigh) is a Georgian Terrace located in the Newtown Pery area of Limerick city, Ireland. The terrace was constructed as a speculative development by the Pery Square Tontine Company between 1835 and 1838. The square was named in honour of the politician Edmund Sexton Pery. The terrace is notable as one of the finest examples of late Georgian architecture in Limerick and Ireland.

== History ==
The architect James Pain supervised the construction of the terrace and may well have been responsible for the design. The contractor was Pierse Creagh from Ennis. By 1838, the houses forming this terrace were let to tenants. The tontine development was the only area of square that was finished. The remaining plots (around the planned square) which were earmarked for development in Davis Ducart's plan for Newtown Pery were never realised and were left undeveloped. Opposite Pery Square is the People's Park which adds to the surrounds of the area. The development was the last of the great Georgian Era developments in Limerick as the years that followed heralded an end to the Georgian prosperity and a beginning to a crippling economic decline in Ireland caused by the Great Famine. Limerick was not to see development of that scale again as was seen in Newtown Pery until the Celtic Tiger years.

Today, a Boutique Hotel is trading at No 1 Pery Square. No 2 Pery Square has been extensively redeveloped by Limerick Civic Trust and is now in use as a Georgian Museum. The rest of the houses are being used to various degrees. Limerick City Gallery of Art is also located at Pery Square opposite the tontine as is Limerick's War Memorial. St. Michael's Church of Ireland, a gothic structure stands at the southern end of Pery Square terminating the vista of the street to the south. Saint Michael's Church adds immeasurably to the importance of Pery Square as the unrivalled Georgian streetscape outside of Georgian Dublin.
