= Athlunkard Street, Limerick =

Street in Limerick city, Ireland

Athlunkard Street
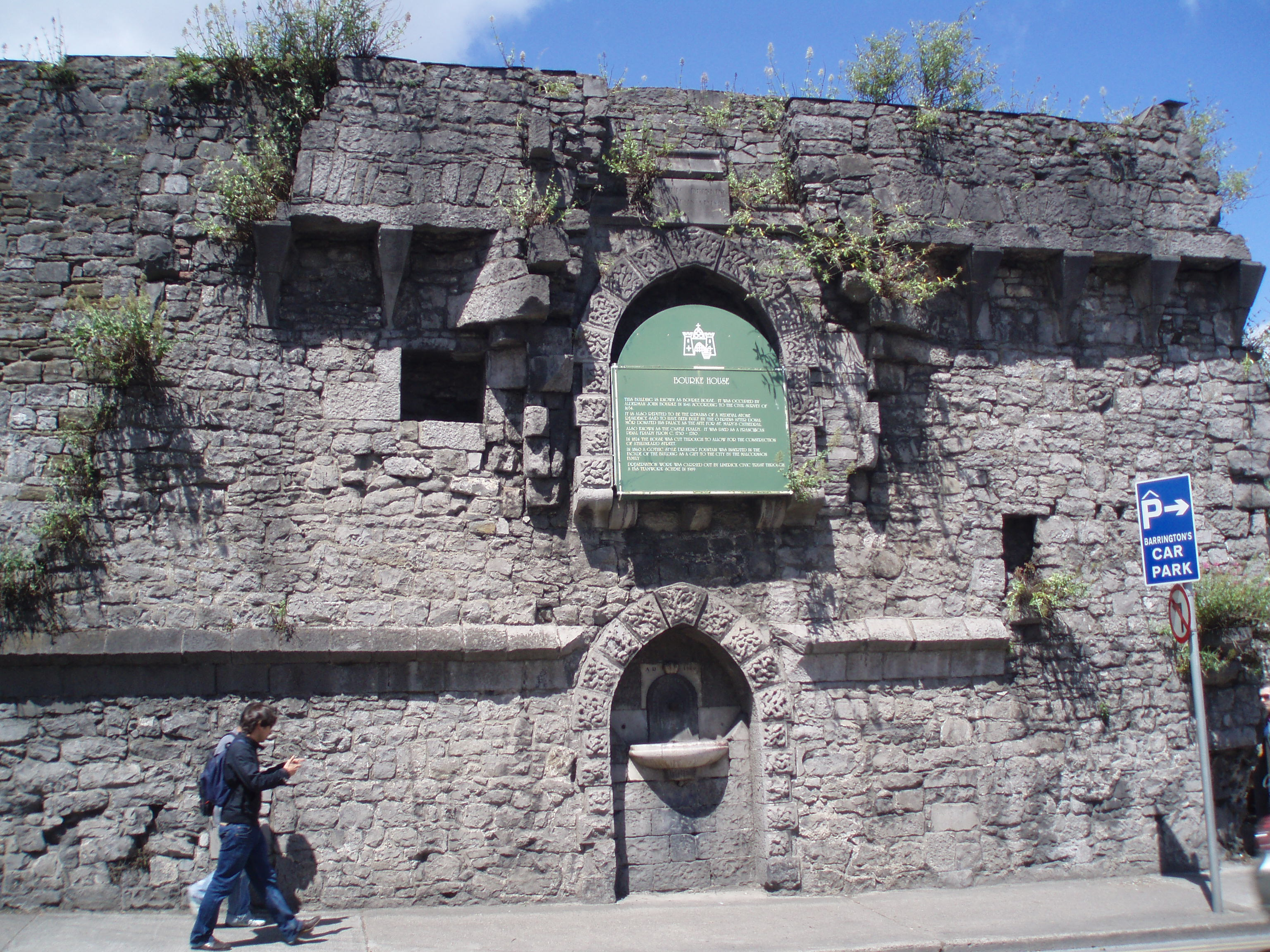
- Bourke's House (1690), Athlunkard Street
- Interactive map of Athlunkard Street
- Native name: Sráid Áth Longphuirt (Irish)
- Namesake: Athlunkard
- Length: 450 m (1,480 ft)
- Width: 14 metres (46 ft)
- Location: King's Island, Limerick, Ireland
- Postal code: V94
- Coordinates: 52.668671°N 8.621092°W
- west end: Mary Street, Nicholas Street, Bridge Street
- east end: Corbally Roundabout

Other
- Known for: Bourke’s House

Athlunkard Street (Irish: Sráid Áth Longphuirt) is a street on King's Island, in Limerick city, Ireland. The Irish name Áth Longphuirt, meaning "ford of the longphort," refers to a 9th-century Viking longphort (defended ship encampment) once located at that ford over the Shannon. Athlunkard Street stretches from the Abbey River, at the O'Dwyer Bridge to the intersection with Mary Street and Nicholas Street. The street was founded on 26 April 1824.

The Arthlunkard name continues over O'Dwyer Bridge with Athlunkard Avenue in Corbally, and the Athlunkard Bridge in Corbally, across the River Shannon from the townland of Athlunkard, County Clare.

== Points of interest ==
- Athlunkard Boat Club, established 1898.
- Bourke's House, constructed in 1690.
- O'Dwyer Bridge, constructed in 1931.
- St Mary's Roman Catholic Church, which opened in 1932 on the site of an older chapel of the same name. It is the parish church for St. Mary's Parish, which was established at the Synod of Ráth Breasail in A.D.1111.
