= Limerick Civic Trust =

Architectural and environmental conservation organisation in Limerick, Ireland

- Limerick Civic Trust CLG
- LCT
- Location within Ireland
- Successor: David O'Brien
- Formation: 1982
- Founder: Denis Leonard
- Purpose: Cultural and Heritage, Architectural conservation and education
- Headquarters: Bishops’ Palace, Church Street, King’s Island, Limerick, Ireland
- Coordinates: 52.67048°N 8.62545°W
- CEO: David O’Brien
- Chairperson: Donal Creaton
- Staff: 78
- Volunteers: 35
- Students: 6
- Website: www.limerickcivictrust.ie

The Limerick Civic Trust is an environmental, architectural conservation and educational organisation founded in 1982 that works to identify, record, preserve and publicise Limerick's culture, history, environment and architectural heritage. Although the trust works in conjunction with local authorities, state agencies and various commercial and professional entities, it remains an independent organisation and is entirely self-funded.

The trust has no direct connection with the Dublin Civic Trust although they do work in parallel and have at various times made joint annual budget submissions.

A significant portion of the trust's work encompasses the protection and rejuvenation of the Georgian area of Limerick city around Newtown Pery.

By 2002, the trust had helped to establish 13 of the more than 20 other civic trust organisations which now exist around Irish towns and cities including Dublin, Cork, Kilkenny, Galway, Belfast and Waterford. By 2002, it had also completed more than 90 projects since its own establishment.

== Notable activities ==
In 2019 the trust launched the Limerick Renaissance Fund, a revolving fund which aimed to provide grants and finance to support the usage of derelict and underused property in the Newtown Pery area of Limerick city.

Also in 2019, the trust was granted a lease at 2 Pery Square for a nominal rent of €1 per year to enable it to launch The People's Museum of Limerick later in October 2019.

In November 2021, the trust was part of a team which was involved in restoring the remaining parts of the city walls of Limerick.

== See also ==
- Dublin Civic Trust
- Irish Georgian Society
