= Irishtown, Limerick =

Area of Limerick city, Ireland

Coordinates: 52°39′50″N 8°37′7″W

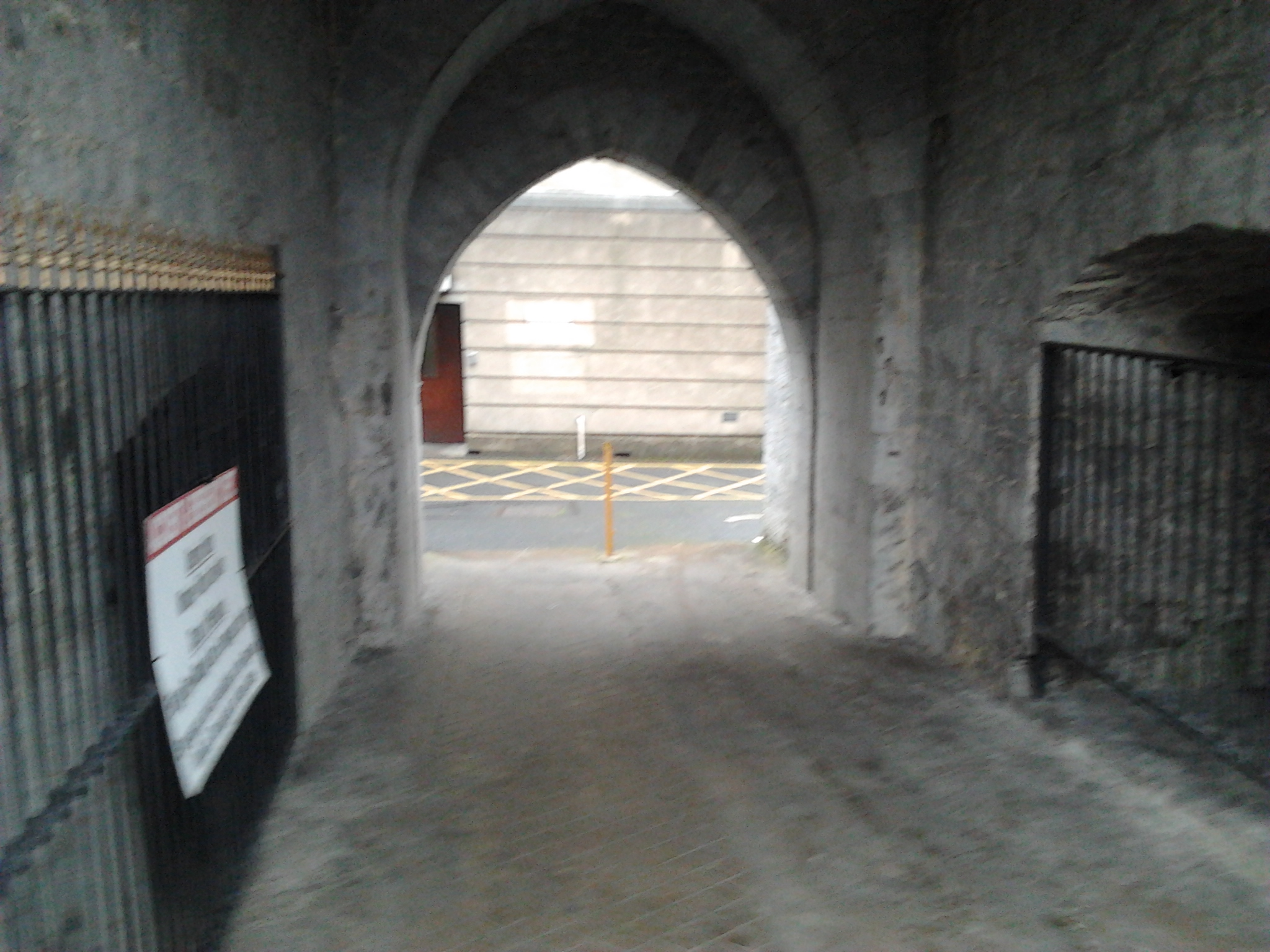
St John's Hospital Arch, Limerick

Irishtown (Irish: An Baile Gaelach) is an area of central Limerick, Ireland. The area along with Englishtown and Newtown Pery forms Limerick city centre. Broad Street, John Street and Mungret Street are the main streets in the district. St. John's Square, a prized early Georgian development is located here as is St. John's Cathedral and the Milk Market which is located off Mungret Street.

Irishtown is one of the oldest districts in Limerick dating from the Middle Ages. The district evolved on the southern banks of the Abbey River as the City of Limerick, located on the southern part of King's Island as an island city from the time of its foundation, grew beyond its boundaries. The Irishtown area was populated mainly by native Irish in contrast to the Norman or Old English settlement on King's Island. The two areas of Limerick had their distinct characteristics and customs and were connected by one bridge; Baal's Bridge over the Abbey River.

The citadel is located in Irishtown and today is located in the grounds of St. John's Hospital. It was here during the Siege of Limerick (1690) that 4.000 of William of Orange's troops were blown to bits during the massed assault on the Black Battery on the Walls of Limerick at Irishtown.

Today, very little of the historical urban fabric remains in Irishtown despite being one of the oldest areas of Limerick and located close to the present day city centre. Following the construction of Newtown Pery the houses were converted into tenements and rented to the city's poorest residents. The houses were very poorly maintained and for a time the peoples lived in slum conditions particularly in the laneways off the main streets. The slums were cleared in the mid 20th century and the Irishtown area literally crumbled with (in some cases) only the outline of the streets remaining such was the dereliction of the area at the time.

The area was rebuilt in the early 1990s and 2000s. St. John's Square, the centrepiece of the area, was refurbished in the late 2000s. Other areas, such as Broad Street, Mungret Street and the areas surrounding the Milk Market, including the Watergate flats have been significantly redeveloped and cleaned up. The area is home to St John's Hospital, a general voluntary acute hospital in Limerick City.

== See also ==
- History of Limerick
