= Newtown Pery, Limerick =

Neighbourhood of Limerick, Ireland

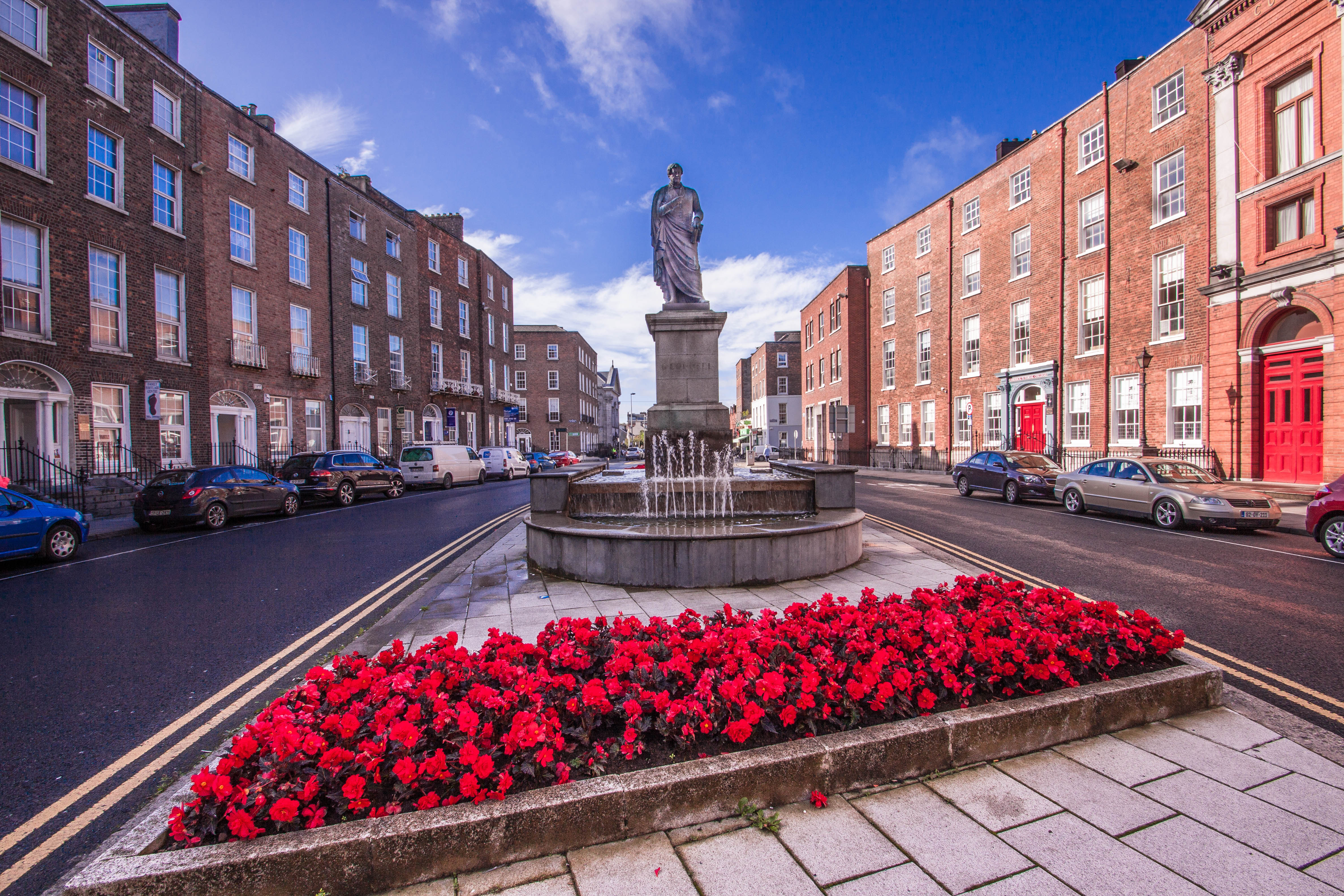
Georgian streetscape on the Crescent, Newtown Pery

Newtown Pery (/ˈpɛriː/; Irish: Baile Nua Pheire) is an area of central Limerick, Ireland, and forms the main city centre of the city. The district is known for its Georgian architectural heritage and is the core area of Limerick's Georgian Quarter. It is one of the three districts that make up modern-day Limerick City Centre, the other two being the older Englishtown and Irishtown, which date from the medieval period. Newtown Pery houses the largest collection of Georgian townhouses in Ireland outside of Dublin. In 1837, Samuel Lewis in his Topographical Dictionary of Ireland described Newtown Pery as "one of the handsomest towns in Ireland".

== History ==
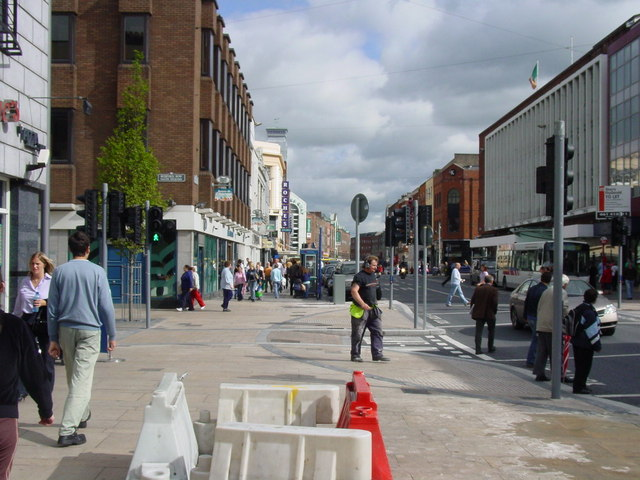
Limerick - O'Connell Street looking north east. The majority of this section of Newtown Pery was rebuilt in the mid to late 20th Century

Prior to the development of Newtown Pery, the historical City of Limerick was situated just north of the present day city centre, stretching from King John's Castle towards where St. John's Cathedral is today. The city was made up of two distinct towns; Englishtown (populated by Old English settlers) located on the historical island city and Irishtown (populated by natives) located on the southern bank of the Abbey River. The two towns were connected by one bridge Baal's Bridge over the Abbey River, while Thomond Bridge beside King John's Castle was a major crossing point of the River Shannon from Englishtown into modern-day County Clare.

As with most cities of this time, Limerick was heavily fortified and walled and the streets were characteristically narrow, winding and cramped. Prior to the construction of Newtown Pery, Limerick was also beginning to exhibit some early Georgian styles within the old city. Examples surviving today include the Old Bishop's Palace at Castle Street and at John's Square (Limerick's first example of fashionable architecture and civic spaces). Early photographs of the old city areas also show the old (pre-Georgian) continental and Dutch gabled styled townhouses as being altered somewhat to appear more Georgian. Very few of these survive today. Originally the land south of the medieval city that was to become Newtown Pery and known as South Priors Land was owned by the Crutched Friars whose priory was dedicated to ‘Beata Maria et Sanctus Edwardus Rex et Martir’ otherwise called St Mary's House. Following the dissolution of the monasteries by Henry VIII this land was granted to Edmund Sexton in 1543 of whom Edmund Sexton Pery was a descendant and on whom much of Georgian Limerick is credited.

Following the turbulent years of the 17th century, Limerick began to prosper in the 18th century and was completely transformed into the city it is today. Easy access from most parts of Ireland facilitated by the River Shannon and the opening of canals enabled Limerick to become the main port city on the western side of Ireland, which in turn brought much prosperity to the city and to its merchants and landowners with trade between Britain and America.

The boundaries of the city of Limerick, where the municipal corporation had authority, were smaller than the county of the city of Limerick, where the city grand jury had parallel authority. The area within the county of the city but outside the city proper was termed the city liberties. The development of Newtown Pery can be attributed to the work of Edmund Sexton Pery (created Viscount Pery in 1785) and his plan for the development of a new town on lands he owned in the south liberties of the city. In 1769, he commissioned the Irish engineer Christopher Colles to design a town plan on his estate which has since become known as Newtown Pery. Colles devised an impressive plan for the Pery Estate which divided the estate into a grid plan of equal rectangular plots and length and of a distinctive architectural unity which still defines the city centre to this day. The town was built in stages as Pery sold off leases to builders and developers who built 4 and 5 story townhouses in the Georgian fashion with long wide and elegant streets in grid plan design with O'Connell Street (originally known as George's Street) as its centre, which was mostly in accordance with Colles' plan. The earliest houses are located along Bank Place, Rutland Street, Patrick Street which were built by the Arthur family - a prominent Limerick family during the 18th century. Some of the finest examples of Georgian Architecture can be seen at the Crescent area and Pery Square. The Custom's House (Hunt Museum), designed by Italian architect Davis Ducart, is also one of the city's finest examples of Georgian Architecture.

By the turn of the 19th century, Newtown Pery was rapidly growing as most fashionable area of the city. In 1807 its leading residents secured a private act of the UK parliament to establish a body of improvement commissioners as municipal authority for the civil parish of St Michael's, within which Newtown Pery was located. The commissioners were abolished in 1853, when the area was absorbed into Limerick city. One brake on the town's development was that the only crossing point on the Shannon remained at Thomond Bridge in the old and now less fashionable Englishtown district. In 1835, a new bridge was built over the Shannon connecting the west directly with Newtown Pery. It was originally called Wellesley Bridge after The 1st Marquess Wellesley, the Lord Lieutenant of Ireland when the act to pay for it was passed. It cemented Newtown Pery's position as Limerick's premier urban district as connections to the area improved. The five-arch bridge was designed by Alexander Nimmo based on the Pont de Neuilly in Paris. In 1882 it was renamed Sarsfield Bridge.

== Details ==
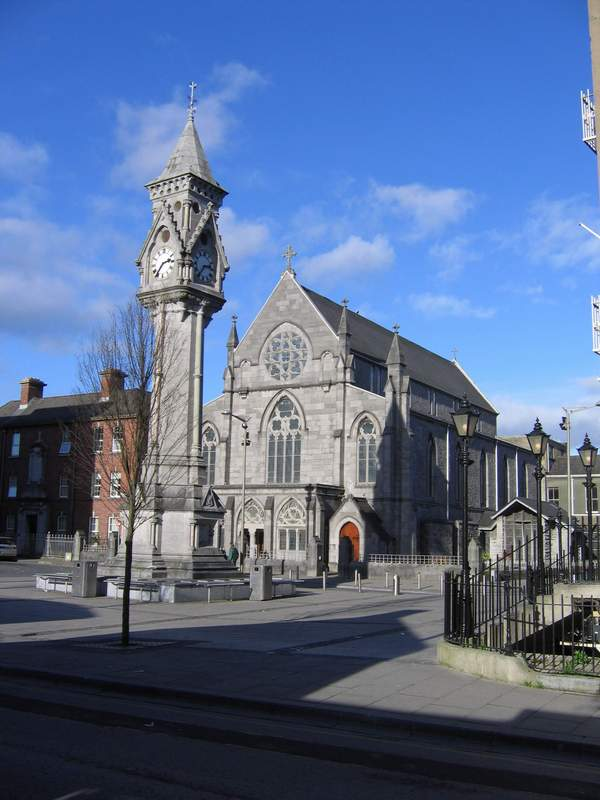
Tait Memorial Clock Tower and Dominican Church, Baker Place

From its development, Newtown Pery has served as Limerick's main commercial district. It is also the city's main retail district which is centered on O'Connell Street, William Street and the adjoining streets. In addition to the quality of the Georgian heritage in the district, another striking feature of the development is the grid plan layout of the streets in the area running north–south and east–west in similar fashion and design as found in New York City, Philadelphia, Glasgow, Bristol and Berlin albeit on a smaller scale. This distinguishes Limerick's Georgian stock to the other major Irish Georgian development in Dublin, as Limerick's terraces are more uniform. This is due to the fact that the Pery owned all the land that was developed and it enabled a single development plan.

Limerick continued to expand following the Act of Union and into the early 19th century; however, Pery's plan for the city was never fully realised. It was intended that the city would continue further southwards; however, a crippling economic decline in Ireland caused by the Great Irish Famine put an end to the development. The terrace at Pery Square was the last development of the great Georgian expansion of Limerick. The terrace itself was intended to be part of a Georgian square enclosing the People's Park, similar to Fitzwilliam Square or Mountjoy Square in Dublin; however, the plans were never realised as the development coincided with the beginning of the Famine. Another distinguishing feature of Georgian Limerick to Georgian Dublin is that Newtown Pery was a completely new "greenfield" development.

Limerick's medieval city was left completely intact and remains to this day. But most of the built infrastructure of medieval Limerick did not survive past the mid-20th century following the clearance of slum living in the city. Some examples survive, and the street outlines remain in Nicholas Street, Mary Street, Broad Street, John Street and Mungret Street. Much of Georgian Dublin, in contrast, was undertaken by the Wide Streets Commission, which almost completely rebuilt Dublin over the older medieval city.

== Decline ==
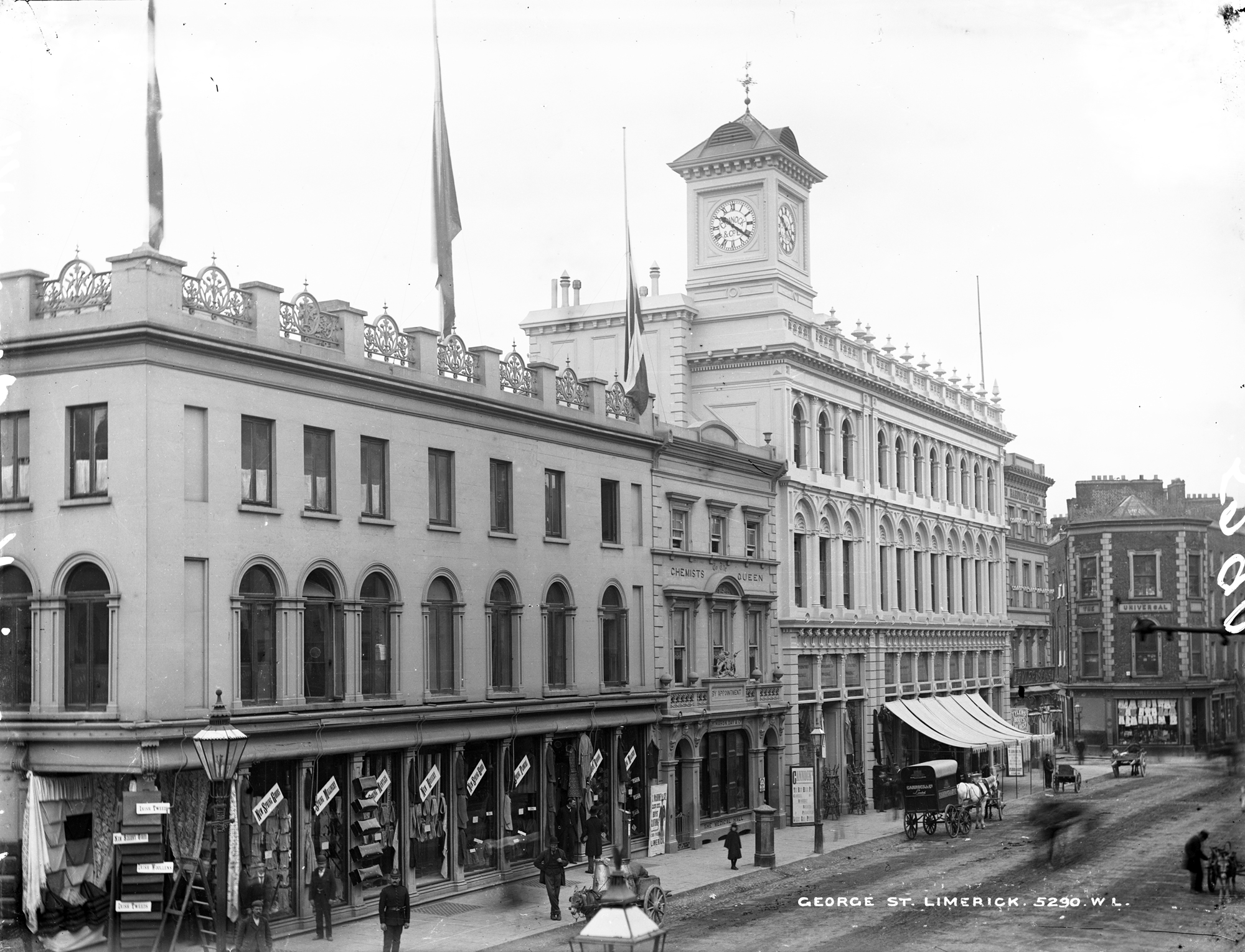
O'Connell Street in the early 20th century featuring the imposing facade of Cannock's Department Store and its landmark clocktower. It was rebuilt in the early 1960s, losing its Georgian character

Although housing an important collection of Georgian architecture and acting as Limerick's city centre, Newtown Pery's position as the one time fashionable area of the city has slowly disappeared. In addition to this, its Georgian heritage has been severely compromised, in particular around the retail core of O'Connell Street and William street. Economic decline and stagnation plagued Limerick during the 20th century which saw some townhouses converted to tenements such as at Arthur's Quay and Bank Place.

During this time very little investment was seen in Newtown Pery, only the exodus of families and industries to new suburban districts around the city due to modern requirements. By the mid-20th century, dereliction had taken its toll as the townhouses at Arthur's Quay, Francis Street and Bank Place were lost. Lax development controls enabled the almost complete rebuilding of the northern end of O'Connell Street and replacing what were some iconic and illustrious buildings with more modernist, cheaper 1960s-style architecture. The loss of Todd's Department Store to a fire which gutted the building, the rebuilding of Cannock's Department Store, Royal George Hotel, AIB Bank amongst many more, altered the look of city. Nevertheless, much of the districts Georgian townhouses remain intact. Despite the architectural losses and economic conditions, Newtown Pery remained the premier retail and services district for Limerick and the greater Mid-West Region well up into the late 20th and early 21st century.

Economic stagnation in Limerick was broken by the Celtic Tiger in the late 20th century. Newtown Pery still lagged behind with regards to investment and planning, with exception to the riverfront of the Shannon. Suburban areas of Limerick saw massive investments, particularly in retail, which saw the onetime retail core of O'Connell Street and William Street being eclipsed by massive retail developments in the suburbs such as the Crescent Shopping Centre in Dooradoyle. However, in the early 21st century, this was realised and as of the 2020s, major improvements are taking place to improve the Newtown Pery area of the city.

To counterbalance the apparent 'doughnut effect' of Limerick City Centre, the City and County Council, alongside the Limerick Civic Trust, Limerick 2030 DAC and the Government are funding and redeveloping the city centre, in particular the Newtown Pery area which comprises most of the city centre. Many of the buildings along the area are occupied by solicitor's offices, accountants, auctioneer's and English schools, and hospitality establishments (such as 101 O'Connell Street and Maggie Choo's). A significant revitalisation project took place on O'Connell Street, the city's main thoroughfare, from April/May 2021 to June 2023.

== Future ==
In order to suspend the decline of Limerick's Central Banking District and Newtown Pery in general, both Limerick City and County Council and the Government have introduced schemes to counteract the heavy suburbanisation of the city.

Amongst the most elaborate plans is the €250 million Limerick 2030 plan which will see a complete redevelopment of the Arthur's Quay area into a new and modern retailing complex. The University of Limerick purchased the former Dunnes Stores building on Sarsfied Street and modernised the building, as well as having the building rezoned from Retail to Educational.

The Living City Initiative helps residents by offering tax relief for repairing Georgian houses in specific areas. It also gives tax relief to shop owners who upgrade or renovate their stores in these designated Georgian areas. Newtown Pery highlights Limerick's rich history and is one of the most important parts of Ireland's Georgian era.

== Landmarks ==
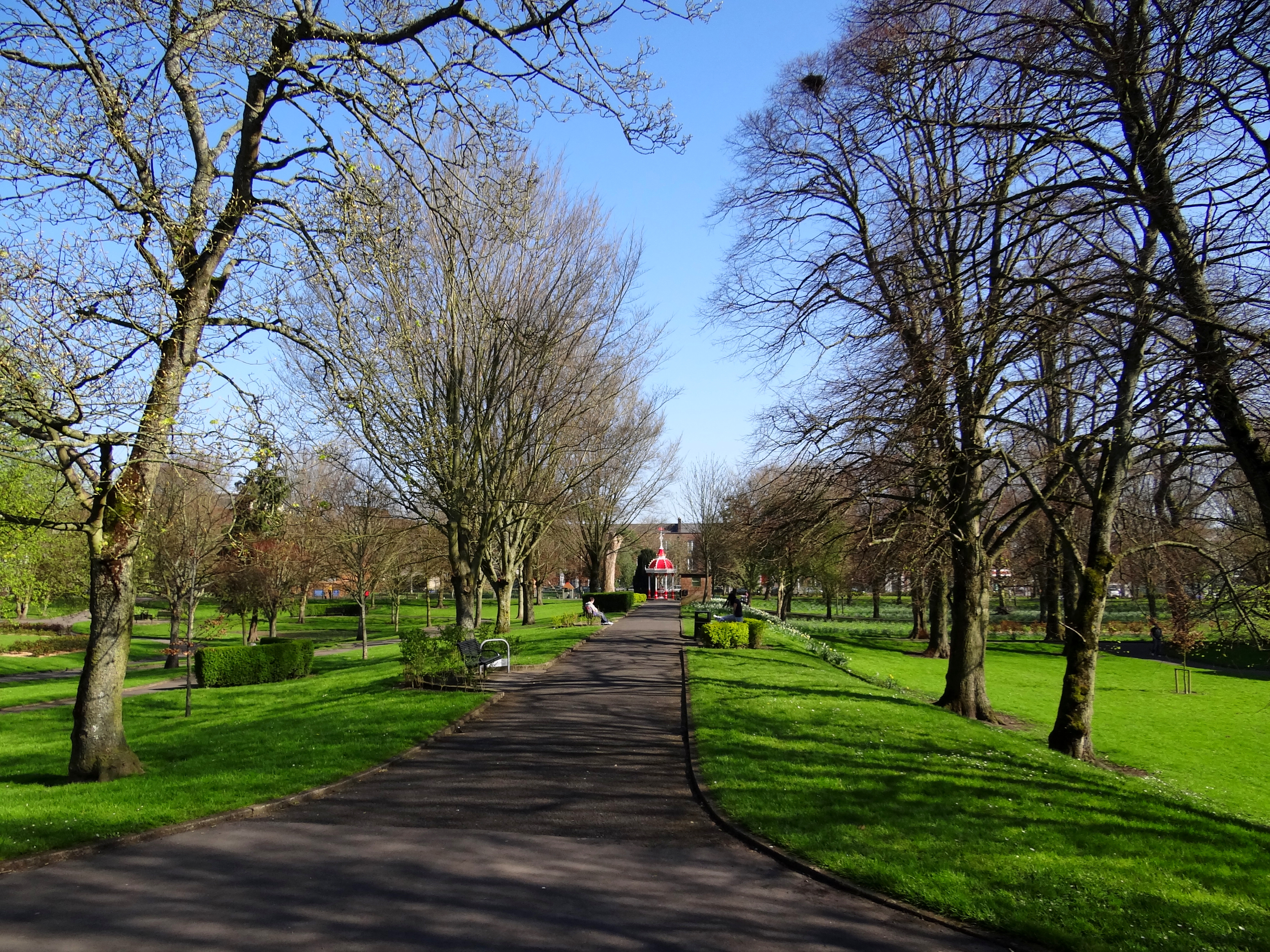
People's Park

The following are a list of notable buildings and landmarks in the area:

- Customs House, (Hunt Museum) Rutland Street
- Old City Hall, Rutland Street
- Augustinian Church, O'Connell Street
- Franciscan Church, Henry Street (closed)
- The Crescent, double crescent shaped Georgian Development
- Sacred Heart Church, The Crescent
- O'Connell Monument, The Crescent
- Dominican Church, Glentworth Street
- Tait Monument, Baker Place
- Spring Rice Memorial, People's Park
- Pery Square tontine development, Pery Square
- The People's Museum of Limerick, Pery Square
- Limerick City Gallery of Art, Pery Square
- Limerick Athenaeum (Theatre Royal), Cecil Street (closed)
- Belltable Arts Centre, O'Connell Street (Currently closed)
- Limerick War Memorial (Cenotaph), Pery Square
- Colbert Station, Parnell Street
- Frank McCourt Museum & Leamy Art Gallery, Hartstonge Street
- Georgian House & Garden, Pery Square
- St. Michael's Church of Ireland, Pery Square
- St. Joseph's Church, Quinlan Street
- Sarsfield Bridge
- Shannon Rowing Club, Clubhouse, Sarsfield Bridge
- Riverpoint, Bishop's Quay
- Clayton Hotel, Steamboat Quay
- 1 Bishops Quay building, the Bishop's Quay

== See also ==
- Georgian Dublin
- History of Limerick
- Architecture of Limerick
