= The Milk Market =

Food market

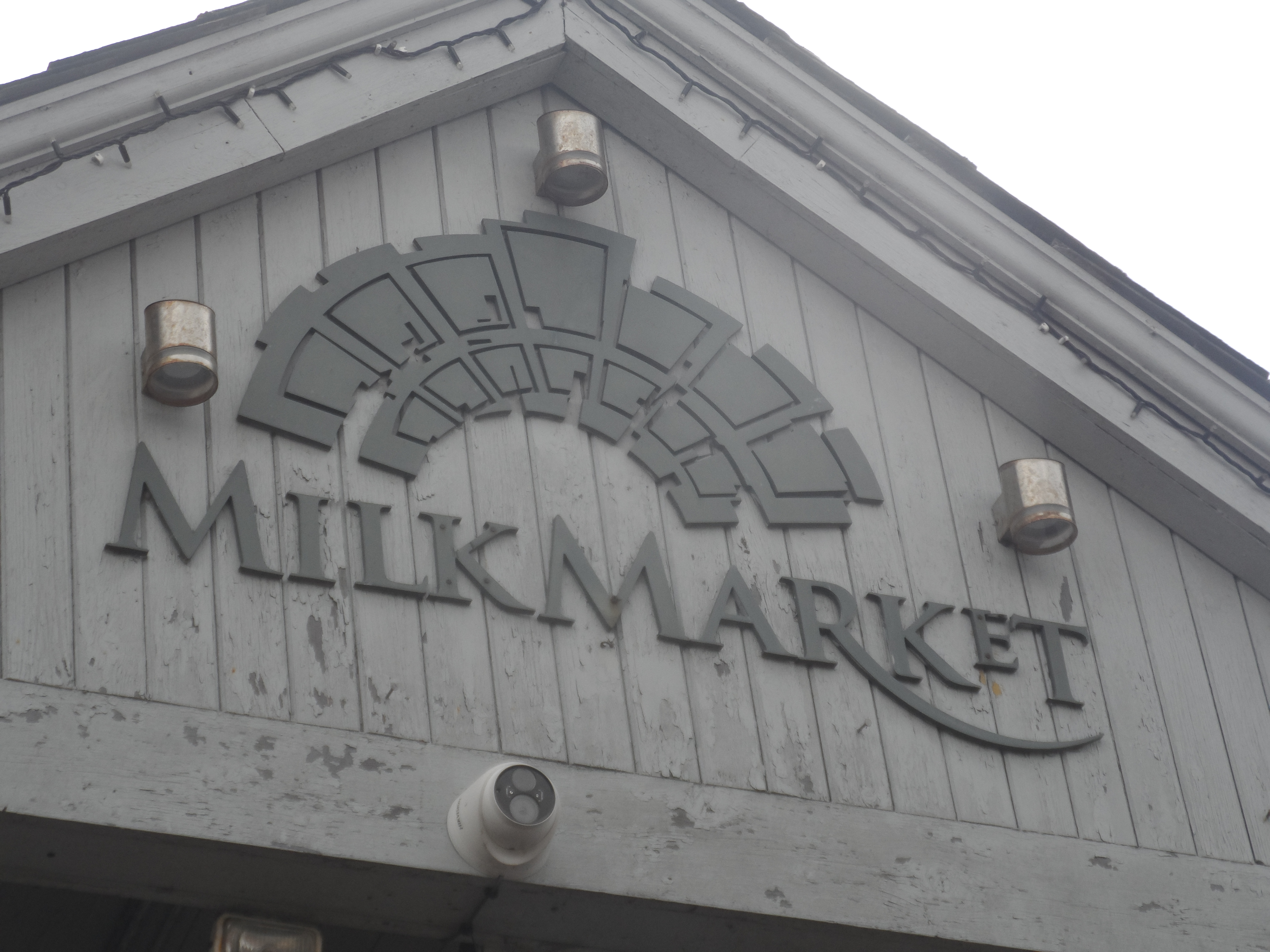
- Location: Mungret Street, Limerick, Ireland; 52.663653°N 8.622056°W
- Opening date: pre-1800
- Owner: Limerick Market Trustees
- Goods sold: food, crafts, clothing, health products
- Days normally open: Friday, Saturday, Sunday
- Number of tenants: 66
- Parking: Cornmarket Square
- Website: www.milkmarketlimerick.ie
- Interactive map of The Milk Market

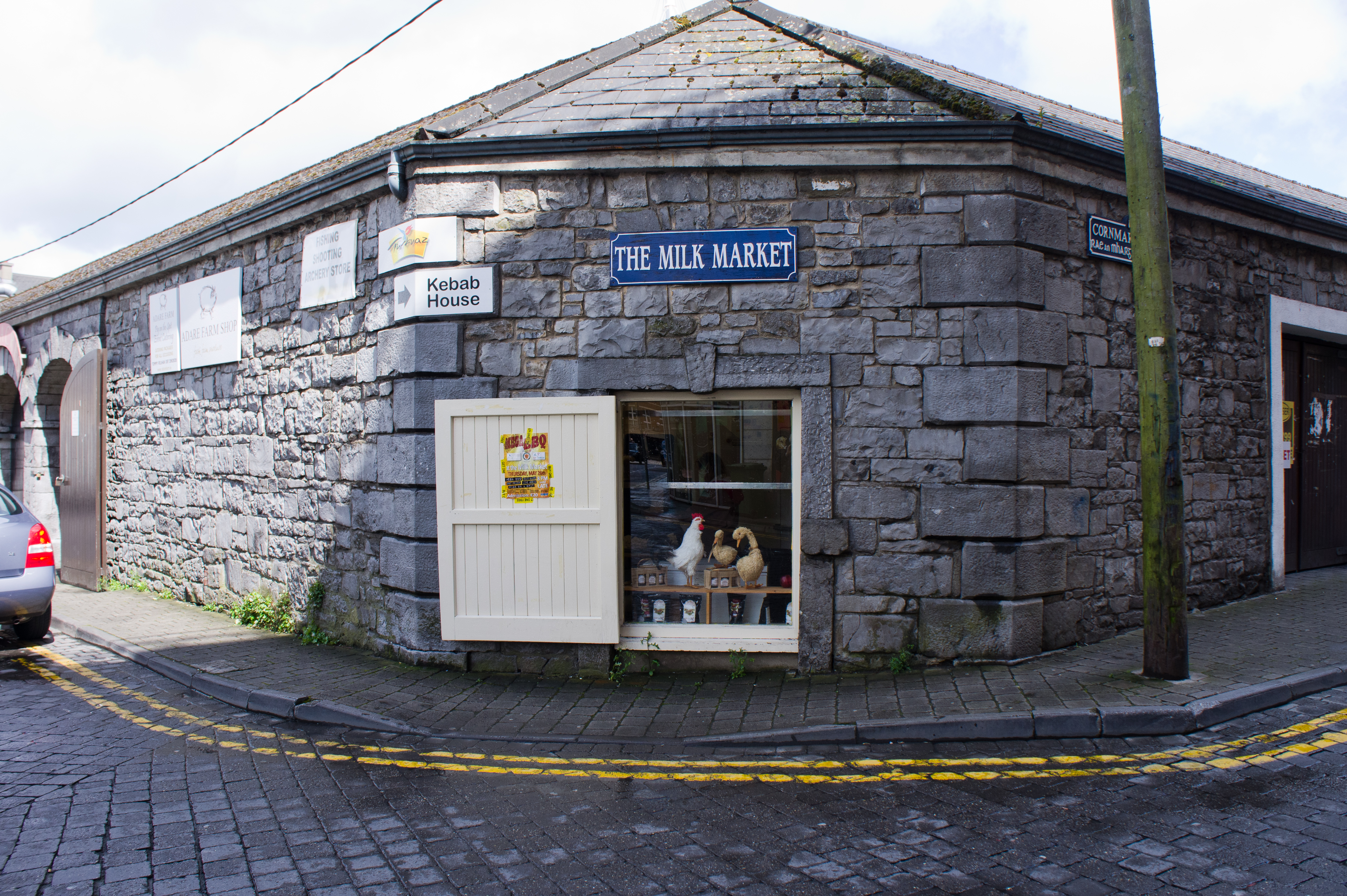
Exterior view of The Milk Market

The Milk Market (Irish: Margadh an Bhainne) is a food market located on Mungret Street, Limerick, Ireland. Despite the name, the market has diversified over the years from its initial purpose and now sells a wide variety of foodstuffs, much of which is produced locally. The market is one of the oldest in Ireland. The flagship market day is the Saturday food market, however, markets are also held on Fridays and Sundays.

== History ==
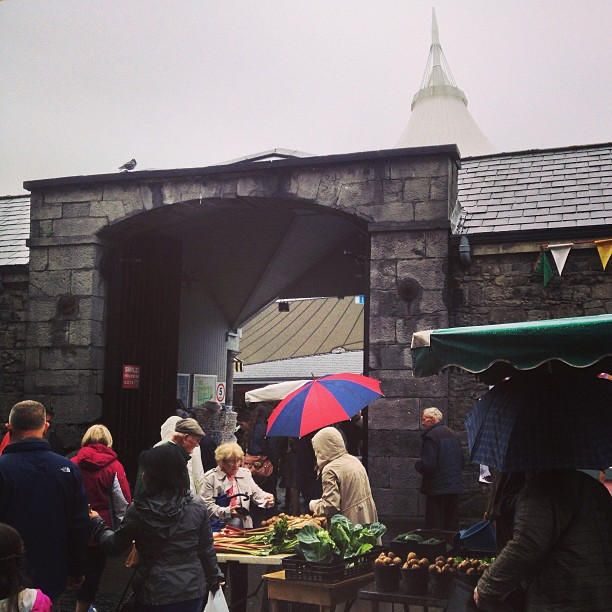
Shoppers at an outdoor stall of The Milk Market

The exact origins of The Milk Market are unknown but its location on Mungret Street in Limerick's Irishtown area can suggest a pre 19th century origin. In the early 19th century, there were a number of markets located in and around the city. It was suggested at this time that the various markets would be brought under a single management system. The Limerick Market Trustees was set up by an Act of the British Parliament, passed in 1852, to expand and manage the affairs of markets within the city boundary and its environs. In order to fulfill their charter the Trustees raised finance and acquired a large parcel of land in the Garryowen area of the city where many of the markets were relocated with the original market properties disposed of. The Butter Market, the Pig Market and the Hay Market were transferred to the new market area. The new market area eventually became a sports ground as is now known as the Markets Field stadium as eventually over time these markets began to fail. The Potato Market (on Merchant's Quay near the old Limerick Port) and the Corn Market (latterly known as the Milk Market) were retained in their original locations. The Potato Market ended in the 1940s, however the Corn Market or Milk Market, continued to operate. The nature of the produce traded there also changed. In addition to the sale of fruit and vegetables there was also trade in fowl, homemade butter and homemade breads and cakes. It was not until the 1950s that the market for bedding plants and shrubs began to grow and this range of produce expanded rapidly in the 1960s. Another feature of the market during this period was the Christmas market for turkeys. Through much of its history (1897-1988), the Limerick Market Trustees was in receivership – the longest receivership period in Irish history. Following the release of the Trustees from receivership, a renovation of the Milk Market was undertaken. This project won a European Heritage Award and it was reopened on 1 September 1995.

== Redevelopment ==
In 2004, the Trustees identified the need and the opportunity to undertake significant new works at Milk Market, in order to make it one of the finest markets in Ireland. These plans were realised in June 2010, with the opening of the redeveloped Milk Market as an all-weather, all year round market space following the construction of a large canopy over the top of the open air market. The venue now accommodates major markets on Fridays, Saturdays and Sundays and occasional markets at other times, a daily Christmas market on the run up to Christmas; a new Food Pavilion and events. The Milk Market Project won the 2011 Royal Institute of the Architects of Ireland (RIAI) 'Peoples Choice Award'. Local architects Healy Partners Architects designed the project in conjunction with Schlaich Bergermann & Partner from Stuttgart, Germany. Also involved were local civil and structural engineers Dennany Reidy Associates.

== Live at the Big Top ==
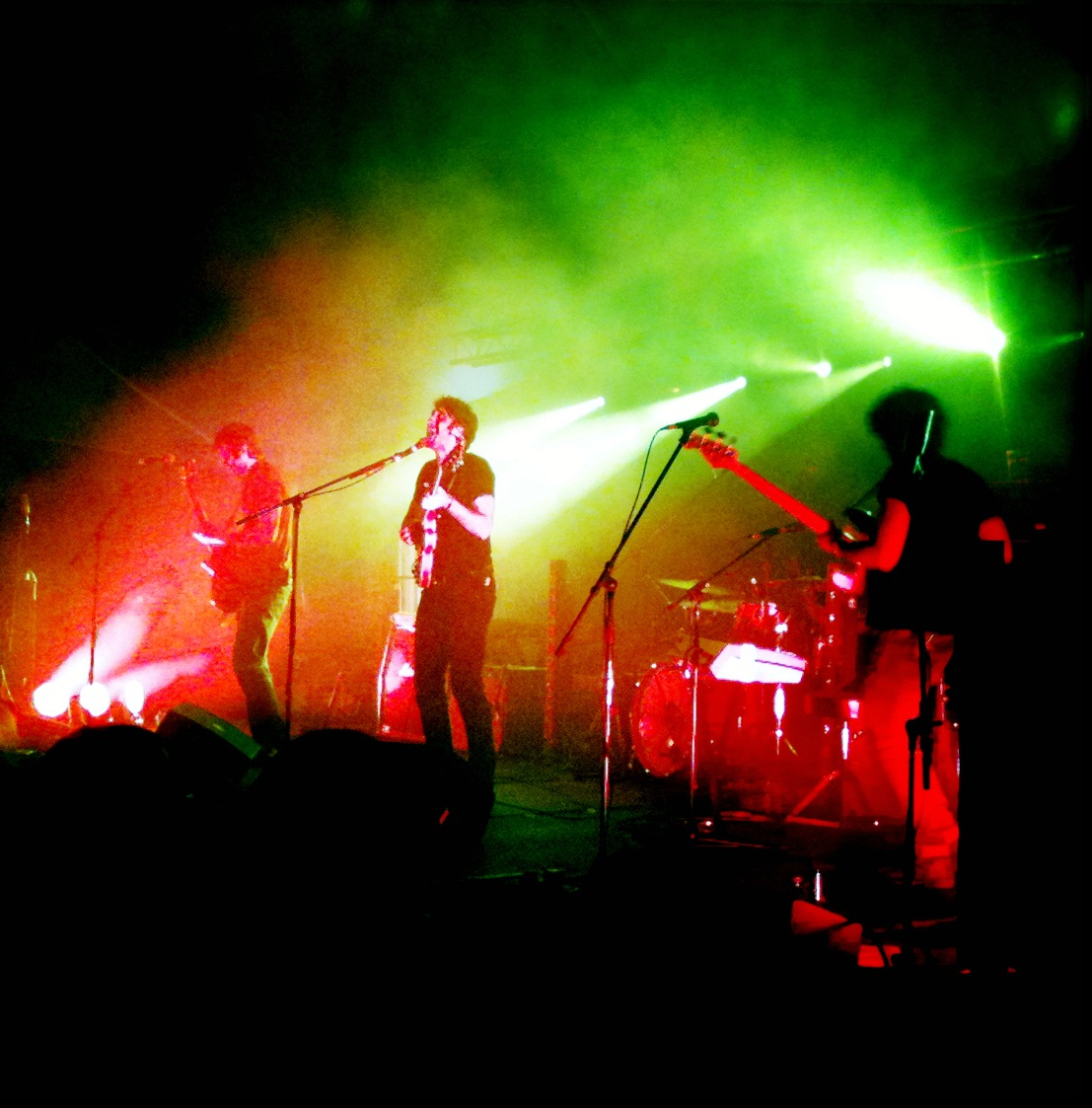
The Coronas performing in 2011

Since its redevelopment, The Milk Market has doubled as an entertainment venue with events marketed as Live at the Big Top. Irish and international music acts to have played at the venue since its redevelopment include Sinéad O'Connor, The Coronas, Imelda May, Bell X1, Villagers, The Stunning, Calvin Harris and others.

== See also ==
- English Market, Cork
