= The Crescent, Limerick =

Street in Limerick, Ireland

The Crescent
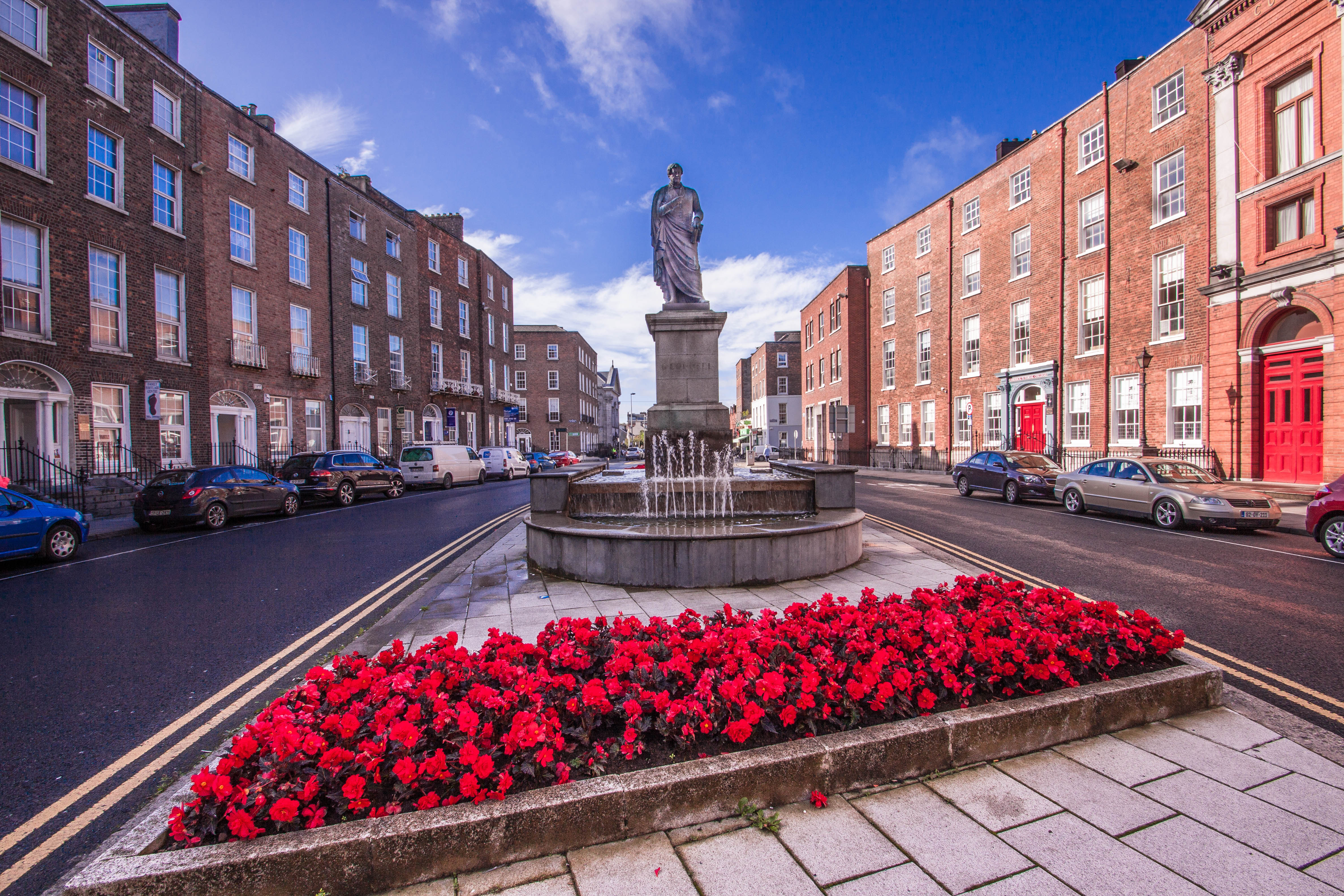
- Interactive map of The Crescent
- Native name: An Corrán (Irish)
- Former name: Richmond Place
- Namesake: Crescent shape
- Length: 100 m (330 ft)
- Width: Up to 35 metres (115 ft)
- Location: Limerick, Ireland
- Eircode: V94
- Coordinates: 52.658922°N 8.631783°W
- northeast end: O'Connell Street, Hartstonge Street
- southwest end: Newenham Street, Barrington Street, Quinlan Street

Other
- Known for: Daniel O'Connell monument, Sacred Heart Church, offices

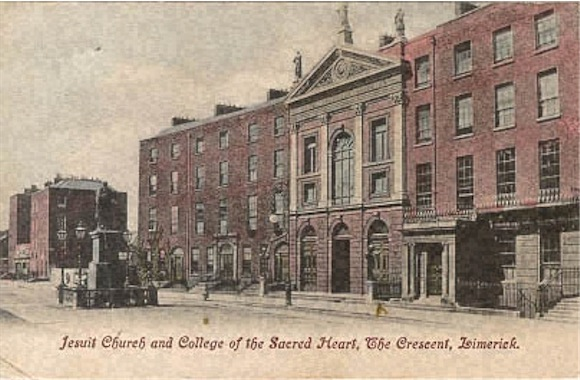
View of The Crescent, Limerick. The Jesuit Church can be seen centered while the O'Connell Monument is to the left.

The Crescent (Irish: An Corrán) is a street in Limerick, Ireland and is one of the highlights of Georgian Limerick. The area takes its name from the shape of the terraced buildings on both sides. The two sides combined give the street a distinctive crescent oval shape. The Crescent was originally known as Richmond Place (after Charles Lennox, 4th Duke of Richmond). A monument to Daniel O'Connell; the 19th Century Irish political leader stands at the centre of The Crescent overlooking O'Connell Street.

On the west side is the Church of the Sacred Heart, a former Jesuit church that closed in 2006. In 2012 the church was bought by a new religious order known as the Institute of Christ the King Sovereign Priest who are currently restoring the church. Adjoining the Church of the Sacred Heart was the Crescent College run by the Jesuit Order. It is now located in Dooradoyle. The site is now occupied by Limerick Tutorial College, a fee paying private school.

Offices, educational facilities (such as English schools) and some residential lettings occupy the Georgian buildings that line The Crescent. Bus Éireann Route 304 serves The Crescent on both sides.
