= King's Island, Limerick =

Island in Ireland

Coordinates: 52°40′10″N 8°37′20″W

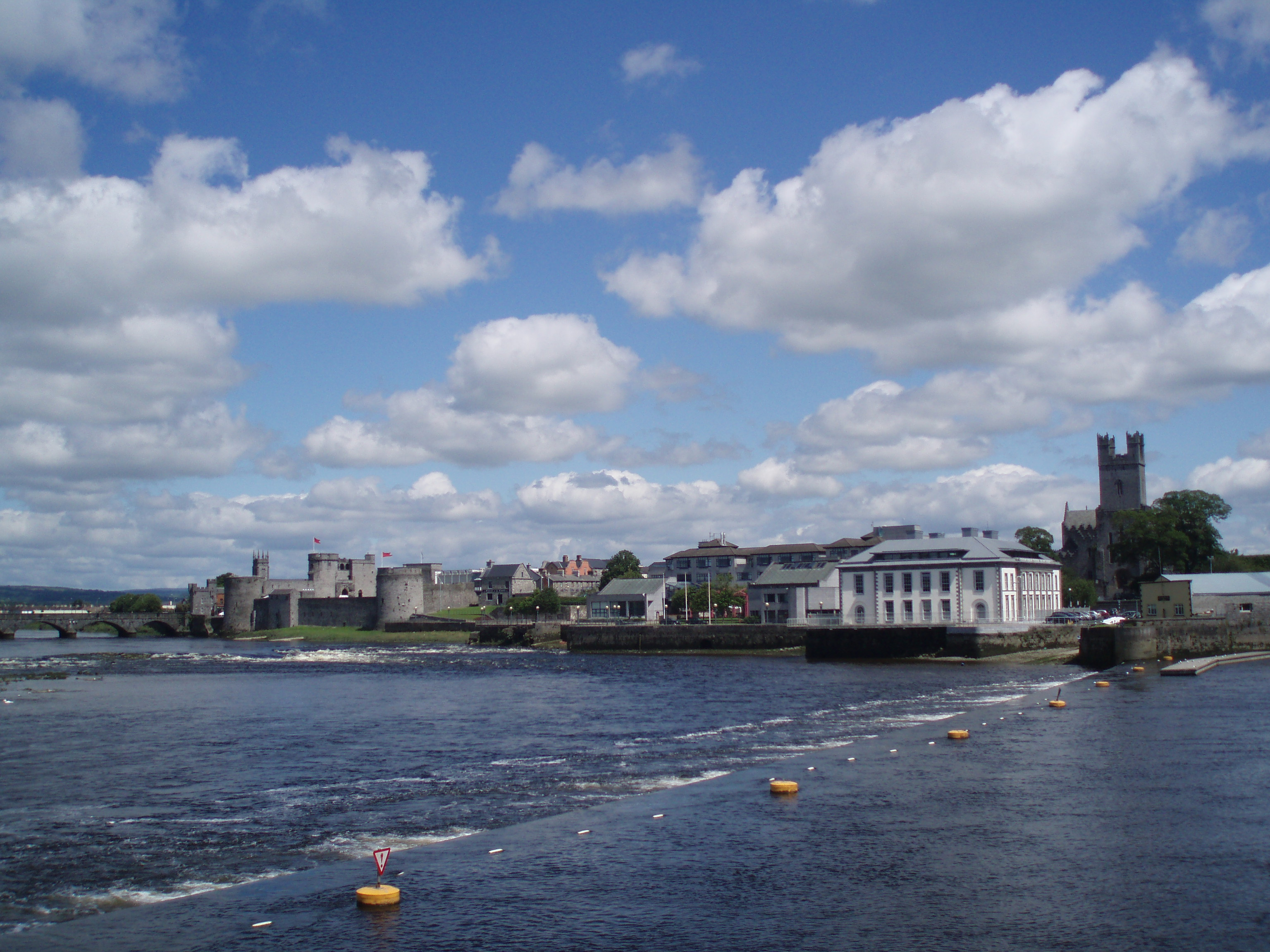
View of Englishtown on King's Island from the River Shannon.

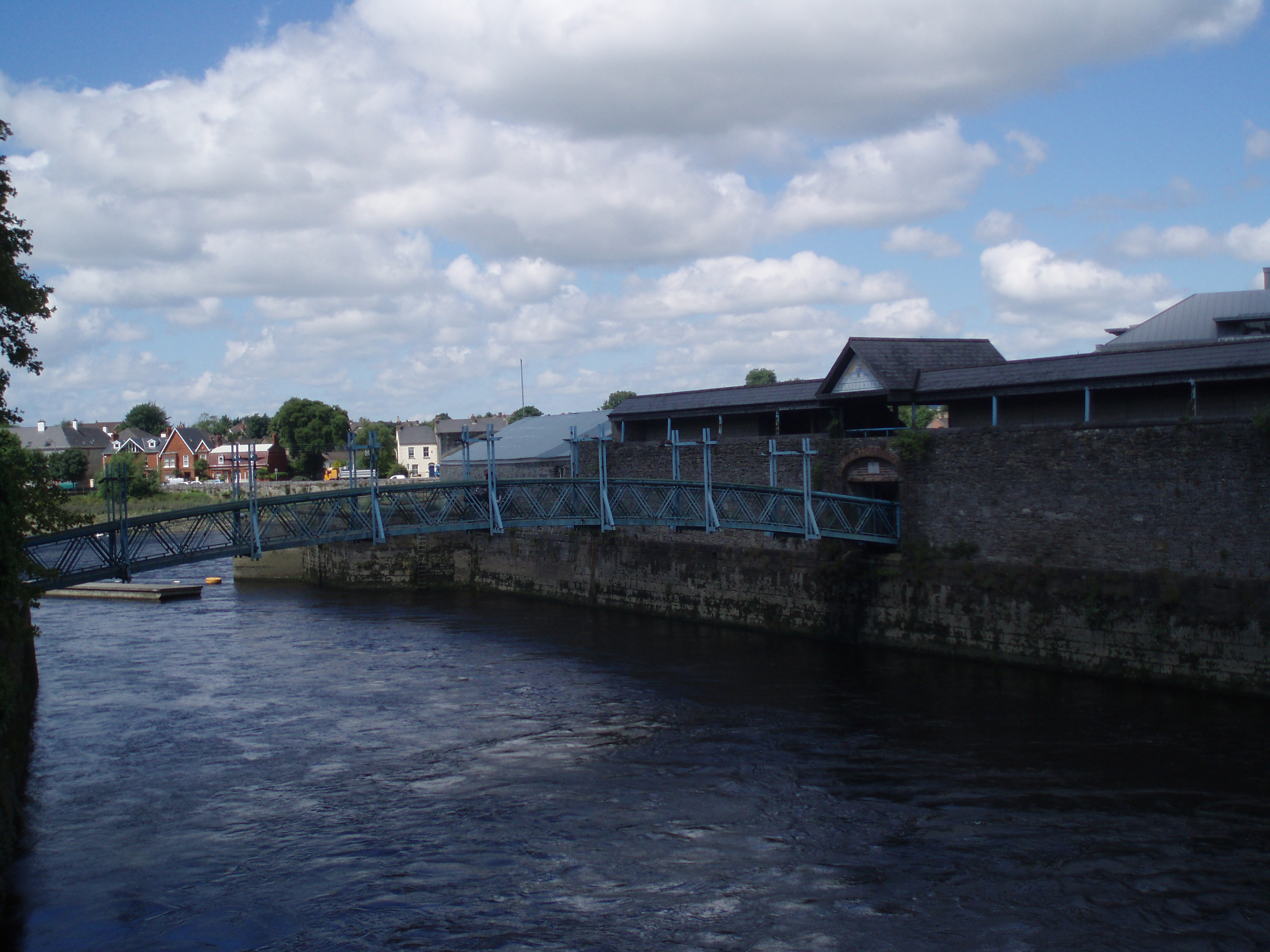
The Confluence of the Abbey and Shannon Rivers at the Potato Market

King's Island (Irish: Oileán an Rí) is an area of central Limerick, Ireland. The area is often referred to colloquially as The Island and consists of two distinct areas, Englishtown and St Mary's Park. The historical city of Limerick known as Englishtown is located on the southern end and St Mary's Park; a local authority housing estate is located on the northern end.

The island is formed from a distributary of the River Shannon. The Abbey River diverts from the Shannon before meeting it again at a confluence near the Potato Market.

The island probably took its name after the 13th-century English King John's Castle was built. However, a 150AD map by Ptolemy shows a place called 'Regia' at the same site as King's Island, and history suggests the presence of earlier settlements in the area. The island's location offers an ideal defensive position at a natural river crossing.

== Englishtown ==
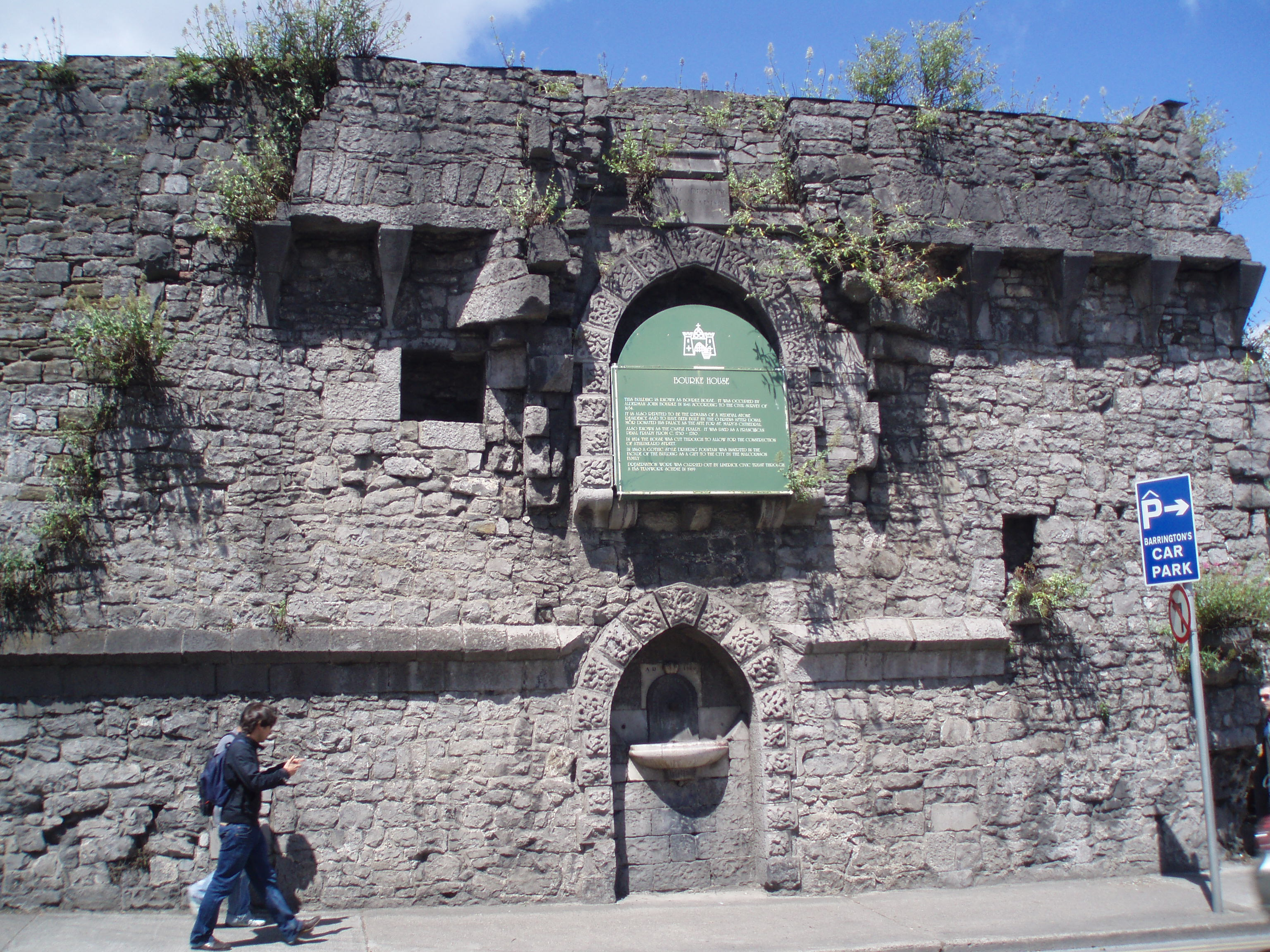
Bourke's House (1690) Athlunkard Street.

In times past, the ancient city of Limerick itself was entirely contained in the area now known as Englishtown as a walled city. The Vikings established the city in this area following the Viking Invasion of Ireland. After the Norman Invasion of Ireland, the city was taken by Norman or Old English settlers. It is from this time that the area became referred to as Englishtown and also to distinguish it from Irishtown south of the Abbey River which was populated by native Irish. It was during the Norman Conquest that many of the city's landmarks were built in this district such as the 13th century King John's Castle and the 800-year-old St Mary's Cathedral. Nicholas Street and Mary Street on the island formed the medieval city centre of Limerick and are perhaps the oldest streets in the city. Samuel Lewis writing in 1837 in his Topographical Dictionary of Ireland describes Limerick's old city of Englishtown as resembling the city of Rouen, Normandy with the housing built in Flemish fashion. Even by then though there is evidence the district was in decline as he describes the area as exhibiting a 'dirty & neglected appearance'. Following the development of Newtown Pery the city centre shifted south to the present day centre of the city and the Englishtown area lost its position as the fashionable area of the city. By the late 18th Century the old continental style cramped lofty Dutch & Flemish houses that once characterised the area were transformed into tenements and rented to Limerick's poorest.

Englishtown became characterised by poverty, slum living and squalor. All of the slums were cleared in the early to mid 20th Century, resulting in the loss of most of the area's historical built heritage such as the collection of Flemish townhouses, Ireton's Castle, the Exchange building, the Tholsel amongst much more.

In the late 20th century, corporation houses that were on the site of the modern-day King John's castle were demolished and an architectural excavation commenced, prior to its significant redevelopment. In the early 21st century, the Kings Island and Englishtown areas were redeveloped into a tourist spot, highlighting the significant historical elements behind the area and embracing the historic culture of the area.

== St Mary's Park ==
St Mary's Park is a local authority housing estate located on the northern part of the island known as the Island Field. As one of the most deprived areas in Limerick city, it is earmarked as part of the overall Limerick city regeneration project which will see the estate replanned and rebuilt with greater integration to the city.

== Landmarks ==
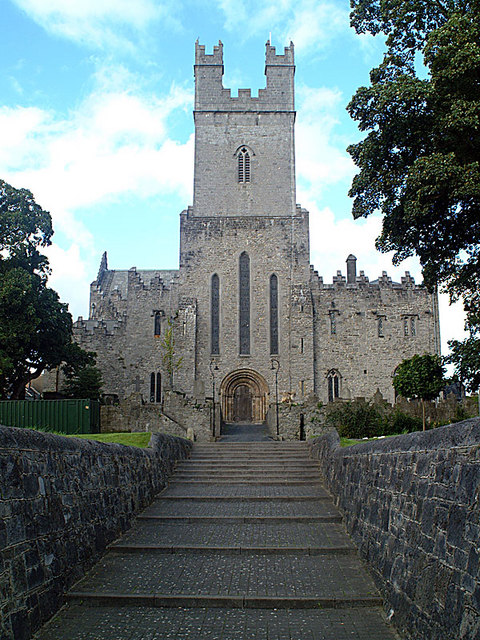
St Mary's Cathedral, Limerick

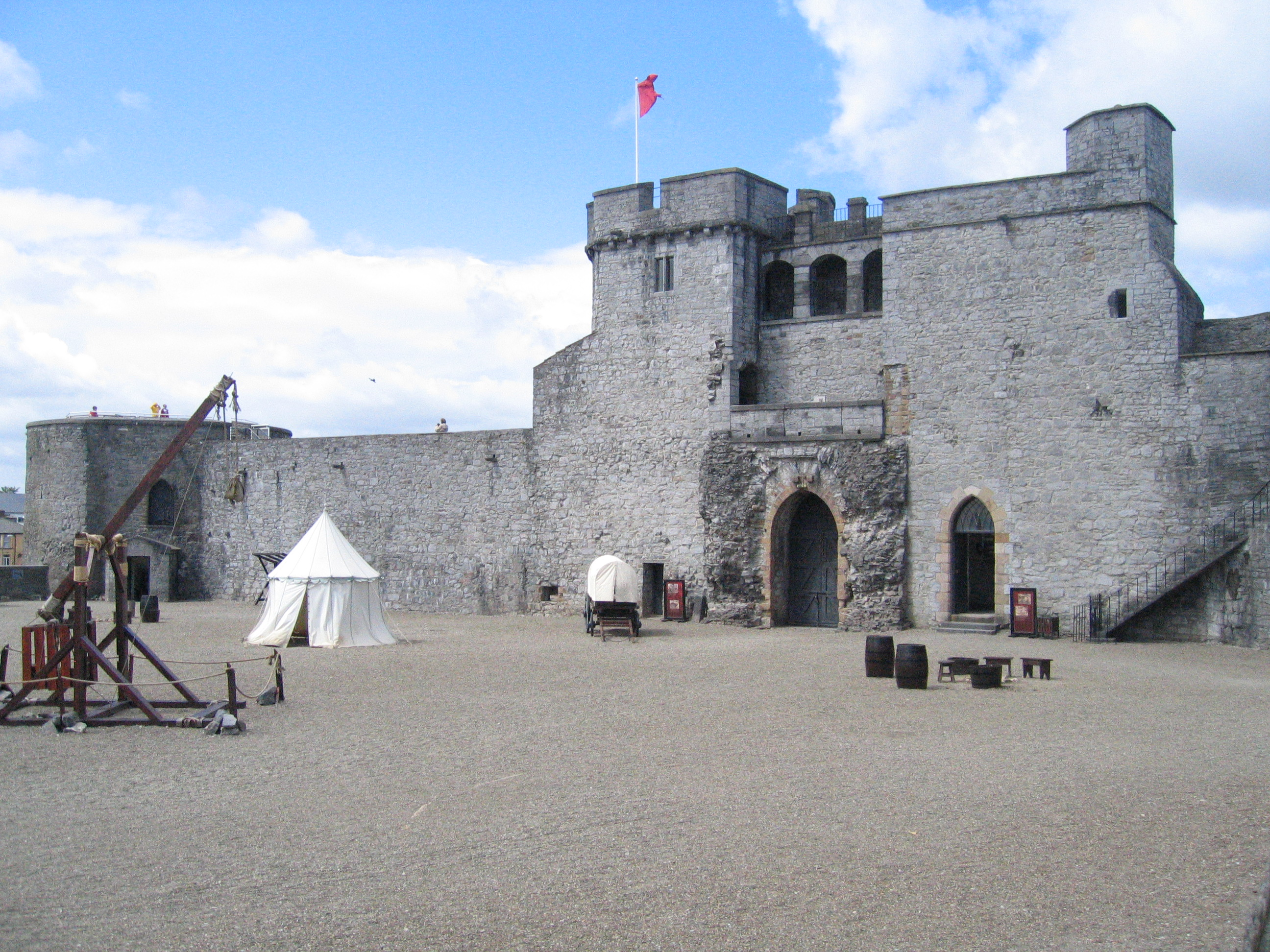
King John's Castle

As the most historic and ancient part of Limerick, King's Island and the Englishtown area contains many notable buildings and landmarks such as:

- King John's Castle, Castle Street, dates from the 13th Century
- St Mary's Cathedral, Bridge Street, dates from the 14th Century
- Old Bishop's Palace, (now headquarters of Limerick Civic Trust), Castle Street, c1750
- St Munchin's Church (now the Island Theatre Company), Church Street, c1825
- Villier's Almhouses, Verdant Place, c1820
- (Royal) Military Cemetery, King's Island, which dates from 1856
- Bourke's Castle, Athlunkard Street
- Fanning's Castle, Mary Street, c1641
- City Courthouse, Merchants Quay, c1800
- Barrington's Hospital, George's Quay
- St Mary's Roman Catholic Church, Athlunkard Street
- Exchange Walls (formerly the Exchange Building), Nicholas Street
- Ruins of the old Dominican Friary, Bishop Street
- Limerick City Hall & Civic Buildings, Merchants Quay
- North Munster Masonic Centre, Castle Street
- Baal's Bridge dates from 1830 replacing an earlier structure (which connected Irishtown to Englishtown in medieval times). The bridge is also known for the Baal's Bridge Square. When the new bridge was constructed in 1830 an old brass square of Freemasonry symbolism was found in the foundations of the original bridge with a date inscribed to 1517. The Square is reputed to be one of the earliest Masonic items found in the world.

== See also ==
- History of Limerick City
- History of Ireland
- King John of England
- Limerick City Museum
