= Limerick City Gallery of Art =

Art museum in Limerick City, Ireland

Coordinates: 52.6589°N 8.6285°W

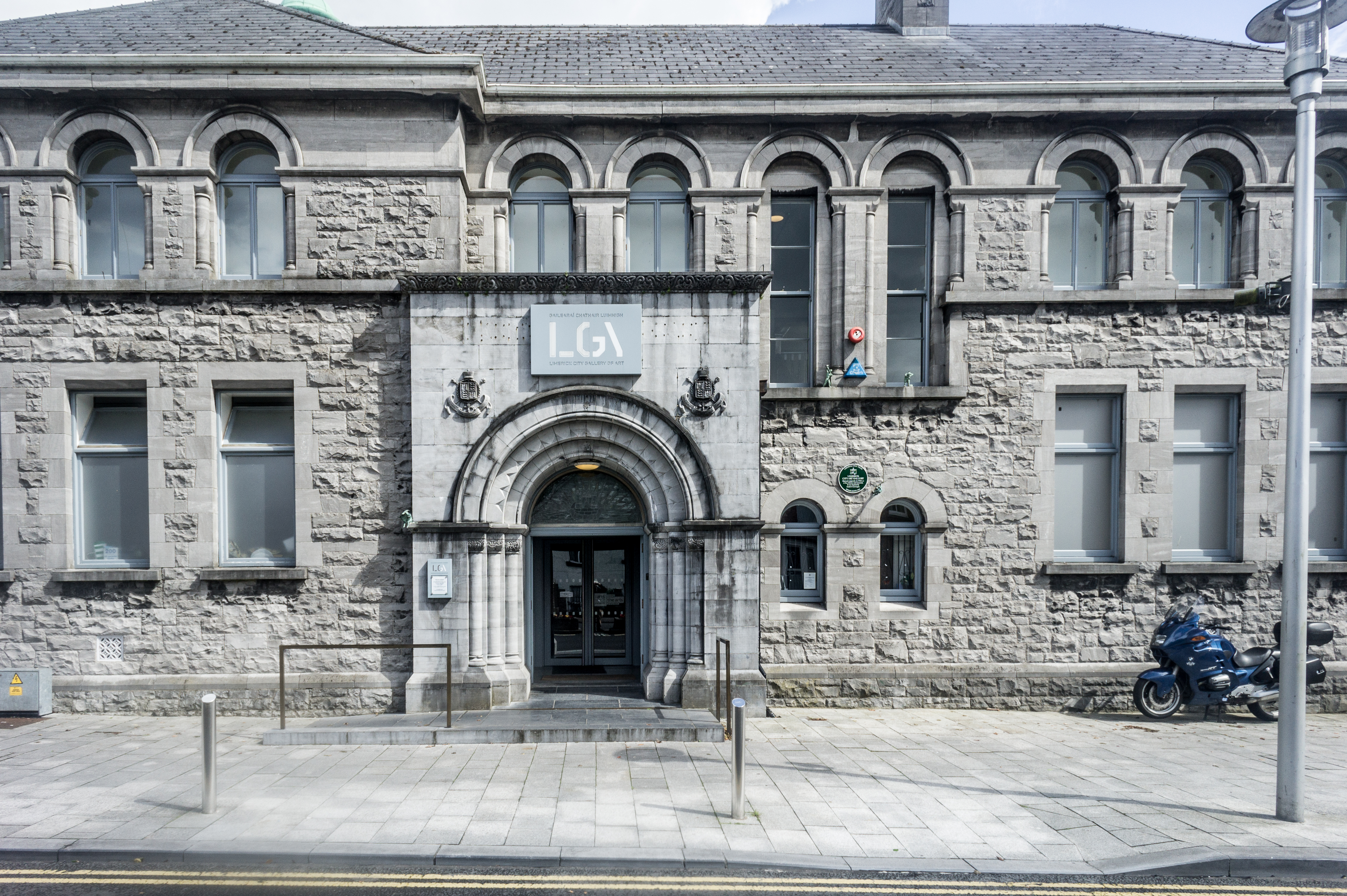
The gallery building

Limerick City Gallery of Art (LCGA; Irish: Gailearaí Ealaíon Chathair Luimní) is an art museum in the city of Limerick, Ireland. It is run by Limerick City Council and is located in Pery Square, in the Newtown Pery area of the city.

The gallery is housed in a Romanesque Revival building which was constructed in 1906 as a Carnegie library and museum. The Limerick City Collection of Art was established in 1936; it has since taken over the Carnegie building and expanded into a purpose-built extension.

The permanent collection includes 18th, 19th, and 20th century Irish artworks. The gallery also holds regular temporary exhibitions of contemporary works, and has been one of the primary venues for EVA International, the Irish biennial of contemporary art.

== See also ==
- Hunt Museum
- Limerick City Museum
- List of museums in the Republic of Ireland
