= Abbey River, Limerick =

Distributary of the Shannon in Limerick

Coordinates: 52°40′N 8°37′W

Abbey River
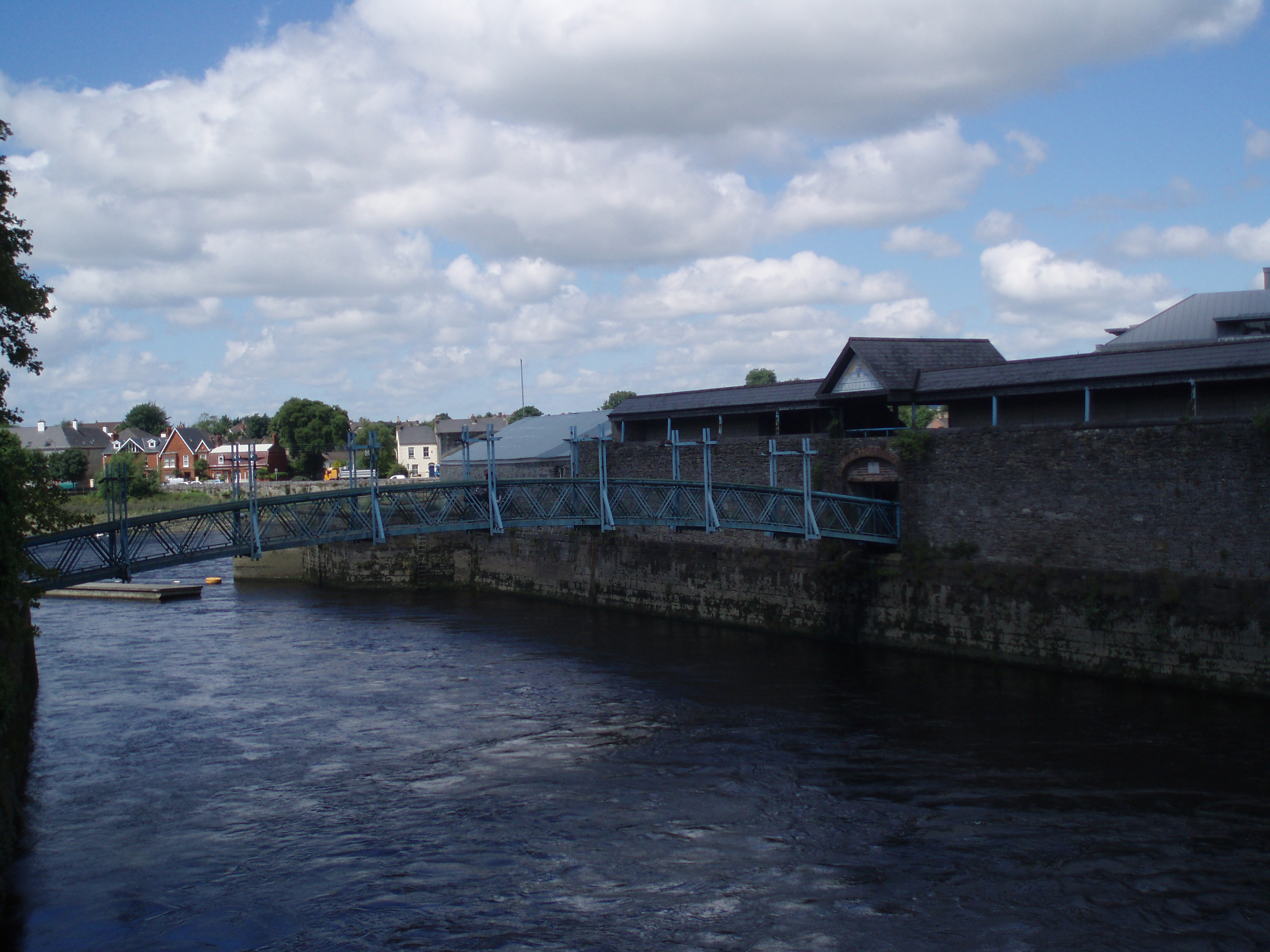
- Confluence of the Abbey and Shannon Rivers at Hellsgate Island

Physical characteristics
- Source
  - location: Distributary of the River Shannon
- Mouth
  - location: Atlantic Ocean as the River Shannon

The Abbey River (Irish: Abhainn na Mainistreach) is a distributary arm of the River Shannon that flows around the northeastern, eastern, and southern shores of King's Island, Limerick before rejoining the Shannon at Hellsgate Island. Hellsgate Island is only visible at low tide. It is bridged by the Abbey Bridge, Baals Bridge, the Canal Bridge, Matthew Bridge, O'Dwyer Bridge, and the Sylvester O'Halloran Footbridge.

King's Island's encirclement by the Shannon and Abbey rivers made it a very defensible location, leading to the founding of Limerick as a Viking settlement in the ninth century. The Abbey River has played a defensive role throughout the city's history, not least during the Cromwellian siege of 1650-51, and the Williamite siege of 1691. It is named after the former Franciscan Abbey located next to the river.

In the early 2000s, a number of historical artefacts were discovered when the river was drained. These included Limerick Port seal, intact mortar bombs from the 1690s and a Viking Age bronze artefact, circa AD 1000.
