= The People's Museum of Limerick =

- Músaem na nDaoine Luimnigh

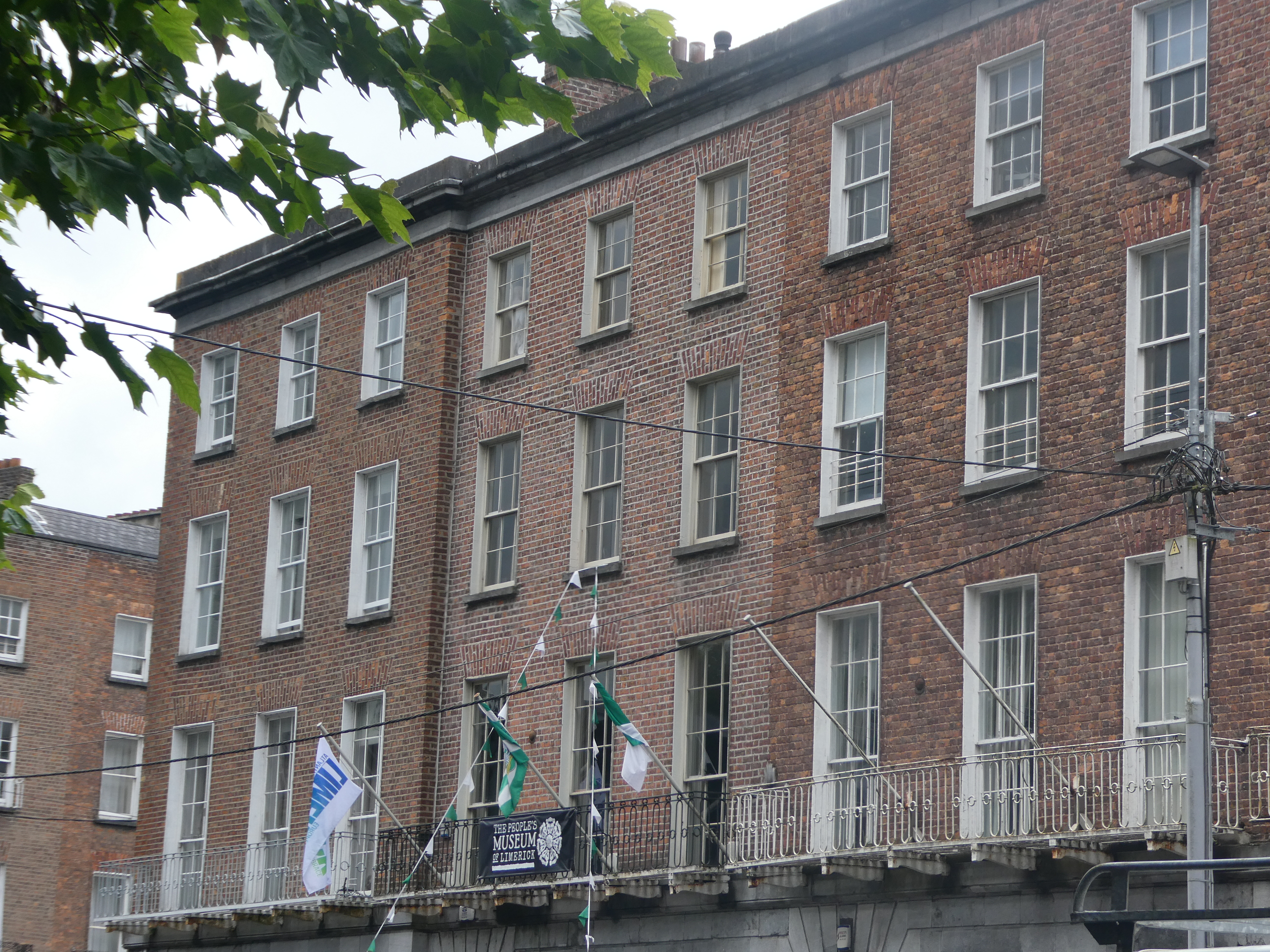

- Location within Ireland
- Established: 7 October 2019
- Location: 2 Pery Square, Limerick, Ireland
- Coordinates: 52°39′29″N 8°37′47″W
- Type: local history museum
- Curator: William T O'Neill
- Architect: James Pain
- Owner: Limerick Civic Trust
- Public transit access: Limerick railway station (600 m)
- Website: peoplesmuseum.ie

The People's Museum of Limerick is a local history museum in Limerick, Ireland.

== History ==
The People's Museum is housed in a Georgian building on Pery Square. Built in 1838, it was part of the Pery Square Tontine Company and was designed by James Pain.

The People's Museum was opened on 7 October 2019 by Senator David Norris. Curators studied the Little Museum of Dublin and the Waterford Experience for ideas. For Heritage Week 2019, Dr Karol Mullaney-Dignam (University of Limerick) gave the inaugural lecture. She sang "Robin Adair" and talked about the musical culture of Irish landed society in the late Georgian and early Victorian period.

== Collection ==
The People's Museum hosts an extensive collection of items relating to the people of Limerick (city and county) and the culture of the region. It also covers military history and Limerick lace. Notable individuals profiled include Richard Bourke, Catherine Hayes, Frank McCourt and Seán Wall.

In August 2020 an exhibit of local taxidermy was opened.

June O’Carroll Robinson donated a collection of items known as the "Carroll collection", being a selection of family heirlooms and military memorabilia of social and political significance dating from the 1700s to the 1920s. This includes the possessions of William Parker Carrol (1776–1842), who fought on the British side in the Napoleonic Wars, include a coat that belonged to Joseph Bonaparte, captured at the Battle of Vitoria.

It is part of the Museum of Childhood Ireland network, with a room devoted to toys and childhood in Limerick.

It also hosts a monthly literary event entitled "On the Nail". Local chocolatier Braw opened an outlet in June 2021.
