= Limerick Archives =

Documents relating to County Limerick, Ireland

Limerick Archives (formerly Limerick Regional Archives/Limerick City Archives) is part of Limerick City and County Council. Its purpose is to collect and preserve archival material relating to Limerick city, and to make these archives freely available to the public. The physical archives are held in the County Library, Dooradoyle.

== Collections ==
Limerick Archives holds a large amount of archival material relating to the Limerick City Council as well as older administrations such as Limerick Union. Materials in the collection include Limerick Rate Books, Registration of Motor Vehicles, private papers, such as Limerick Chamber of Commerce, Bedford Row Lying-in Hospital. The Limerick Archives collections has been used for source material for publications, as well as stand alone publications.

Digital Collections: In 2008 Limerick City became the first locality in Ireland to make its archives available online. These collections are separated into two sections: Limerick City Council and Local Government Collections, and Private Papers and Business Collections. They have also digital archives of newly created material such as the Limerick Leader 1970s photograph collection under the name From Limerick with Love.

== Exhibitions and Publications ==
=== Sean Wall ===
Exhibition on the life of Sean Wall, and his role during Irish War of Independence. Launched 2021. This was a part of a number of projects under the Decade of Commemorations programme for Limerick City and County Council.

=== Amazing Lace ===
Exhibition and Publication by Matthew Potter. As part of Limerick City of Culture. In December 2014, an exhibition of Limerick Lace took place in Limerick Museum and a book on the history of Limerick was launched. The exhibition hold an interactive dress created by a student in Interactive Media in University of Limerick.

=== Mount Saint Lawrence ===
Database, Conference and publication by Matthew Potter. The Mount saint Lawrence project began in 2008 with the transfer of the burial records of Limerick's largest cemetery to Limerick Archives. The Limerick Archives digitising the original records and putting them online. In collaboration with Mary Immaculate College about 70,000 burials were transcribed and a database was launched in August 2013. In April 2014, an international conference on death and burial called Beyond the Grave was organised by Limerick Archives and Mary Immaculate College to coincide with the launch of the Mount Saint Lawrence grave marker database.

=== Haselbeck Collection ===
Exhibition. This was the first exhibition of the Limerick City of Culture 2014 calendar, it was launched by the then Minister for Arts, Jimmy Deenihan. It showcased photographs of Limerick city and county from the early 20th century and was held in City Hall and Limerick Museum.

=== City of Churches ===
Exhibition and Publication. As part of Limerick City of Culture an exhibition and book were created to detail all the religious houses in Limerick city. The exhibition began in March 2014 and was shown in various secular and non-secular venues throughout the city.

=== From Limerick With Love ===
Exhibition. In late 2013 Limerick Archives scanned and catalogued the Limerick Leader photograph negative collection of the 1970s. In March 2014, an exhibit of some of these images along with reaction images from students of [LSAD] was launched in Shannon Airport. In September 2014 the exhibition was moved into City Hall, Merchant's Quay, Limerick to coincide with the launch of the archive database.

=== The Retrospective ===
Exhibition. To mark the merger of Limerick City and County Councils in April 2014, two exhibitions were created to showcase the governmental history of both of these councils. The exhibitions were held in tandem in County Hall, Dooradoyle and Limerick Museum.

=== St. Joseph's Hospital ===
Exhibition. St. Joseph's Hospital was founded as Limerick District Lunatic Asylum in 1827, exhibition held in Limerick Museum in March 2013 as the records had been transferred from the Health Service Executive (Ireland) to Limerick Archives.

=== Ranks Mills ===
Exhibition and Publication. Ranks: A Community Story, March 2012, exhibition held at the Hunt Museum. This exhibition won ‘Best Publication/Interpretation Award 2012 by the Industrial Heritage Association of Ireland. This exhibition was rehung in September 2015.
