= Guna Nua =

Irish theatre company

Gúna Nua Theatre Company is an independent Irish theatre production company based in Dublin. It was founded in 1998 by Paul Meade and David Parnell, and Meade remains artistic director of the company. The company is grant-aided in Ireland by the Arts Council and by Dublin City Council.

== History ==
Gúna Nua Theatre Company was founded in 1998 by Paul Meade and David Parnell. As of 2025, Paul Meade was the artistic director of Guna Nua Theatre Company.

== Production history ==
In November 2014, Gúna Nua presented The Unlucky Cabin Boy – a new musical devised by the company in collaboration with playwright Mike Finn and the Brad Pitt Light Orchestra.

In April 2019, the Gúna Nua production of Bread not Profits, written by Mike Finn about the "Limerick Soviet", was created as a "new large scale, site-specific, theatre production" commemorating the 100th anniversary of the Limerick Soviet, in which workers in Limerick went on strike in protest against British military occupation of the city in 1919. The play was first presented at the Belltable arts centre in Limerick.

In August 2024, the company produced The Magic Play, written by Liam Wilson Smyth and directed by Paul Meade, in Bewley's Cafe Theatre, and the following year, it presented another play by the same playwright, the comedy drama Synapses, at the Civic Theatre in Dublin. In May 2026, Synapses was produced at the Whale Theatre in Greystones, County Wicklow, and at the BellTable.

In April 2026, a production by Gúna Nua was included as part of an event celebrating the 30th anniversary of its official opening of the Town Hall Theatre in Galway.

=== World premieres ===
- The Morning After The Life Before – written by Ann Blake. First performed in the Belltable Arts Centre, Limerick
- Meltdown by Paul Meade (co-production with axis:Ballymun) – Presented at axis:Ballymun and Project Arts Centre as part of Absolut Fringe, 2009. Also presented at Civic Theatre Tallaght.
- Little Gem by Elaine Murphy (co-production with Civic Theatre) – Winner Carol Tambor Best of Edinburgh Award, Winner BBC/Stewart Parker Award, Winner Fishamble New Writing Award and Best Female Performer Award (entire cast as ensemble), 2008.
- Unravelling the Ribbon by Mary Kelly and Maureen White (co-production with Plan B Productions). Presented in association with Action Breast Cancer, proudly sponsored by Avon Breast Cancer Crusade. Project Cube 2007.
- Trousers by Paul Meade and David Parnell (co-production with Civic Theatre Tallaght
- Thesis by Gerry Dukes, Paul Meade and David Parnell (co-production with Civic Theatre)
- Skin Deep by Paul Meade – Stewart Parker award for Best New Play and nominated for two Irish Times/ESB theatre awards. Project Arts Centre 2003.
- Taste by David Parnell Andrew's Lane 2002.
- Scenes From a Water Cooler by Paul Meade and David Parnell – Winner, Dublin Fringe Awards, Best Production and Best Actor (David Pearse).
- Four Storeys by David Parnell. Project@themint 1998.

=== Irish premieres ===
- Dinner With Friends by Donald Margulies (co-production with Lane Productions) – Irish Times/ESB theatre awards nomination, best set design, Ferdia Murphy. Andrews Lane 2004.
- The Real Thing by Tom Stoppard. 2004.
