= Ann Blake =

Irish theatre practitioner and musician

- Occupations: Musician and theatre practitioner
- Years active: 2010–present

Ann Blake is an Irish musician and theatre practitioner based in Limerick, Ireland. As of 2020, she is an Artist-in-Residence with Ormston House. She had worked with Ormston House since 2013 on projects such as The Misadventures of a Good Citizen, The Museum of Mythological Water Beasts and The Feminist Supermarket. She co-hosts a monthly podcast, The Limerick Lady, with Emma Langford. It has included guests such as Denise Chaila, Sharon Slater, Amanda Palmer, and Pamela Connolly of the Pillow Queens. She also hosts a podcast, Ann and Steve Talk Stuff, with Stephen Kinsella.

She is a founding member of Choke Comedy Improv with Myles Breen. Her play, The Morning After The Life Before, first produced in 2017, was based on her own life experience with the backdrop of the referendum for the Thirty-fourth Amendment of the Constitution of Ireland included the provision for same-sex marriage in Ireland. Blake both wrote and performed in this play, which was produced by Gúna Nua and first performed in Belltable Arts Centre. Since then, it toured both nationally and internationally, having been performed in such places as Viking Theatre in Clontarf, Dublin, Bewley's Theatre, Dublin, Omnibus Theatre, London. While winning top awards at the London Fringe, Ontario, and Montreal Fringe, in 2019, it had five nominations and won two awards at the Origin Theatre's 1st Irish Awards in New York. The play was favourably reviewed.

She is a member of the Brad Pitt Light Orchestra. In 2010, they released their debut album, Lowering The Tone. They performed at Irish festivals such as Electric Picnic, and on The Late Late Show (Irish talk show). In 2025, she co-wrote and directed "Connie" a play about the life of Limerick actor Constance Smith.
