= Limerick Pride =

Annual LGBTQ+ event in Ireland

- Frequency: Annually
- Locations: Limerick, Ireland
- Inaugurated: 2001; 25 years ago
- Website: limerickpride.ie

Limerick Pride is a week-long annual event in Limerick, Ireland. Although its history dates back to 2001, with the first official pride event, the Pride parade was not introduced until 2007.

== History ==
The Pride parade took place in September from 2007 until 2013. It was moved to July in 2014 to avoid clashing with the Royal de Luxe event in September that year. The festival was made a week-long event in 2008. The final event of the week, the "Climax Party", is held in Dolan's Warehouse, with performers such as Leanne Moore (2008), Niamh Kavanagh (2010), Jujubee (2019), and Courtney Act (2002) headlining.

In 2008, the Pride parade had its first Grand Marshal, Alternative Miss Ireland winner Sheila Fitspatrick, and her partner Madonna Lucia. Other Grand Marshals have included actor Myles Breen (2015), Broden Giambrone (2016), Richard Lynch, Founder of I Love Limerick (2018), Moninne Griffith, Executive Director of BeLonG To (2019), Sharon Slater (2022) and Jackie McCarthy-O'Brien (2023).

During the lockdown period (2020-2021), virtual pride were provided. The annual "Tea Dance" with actor Myles Breen continued through this medium.

Sport plays a strong role in the Limerick Pride event calendar. In 2021, they held an evening discussion, "Trailblazers of Women’s International Sport", with three of Limerick’s athletes Grannie Cross, Sinead Cosgrave and Jackie McCarthy O'Brien hosted by Sporting Pride and GCN. In 2022, a new event was introduced, an inter-county Association football match between Limerick and Clare, to highlight women in sport. Limerick won the inaugural game. Also that year, two rainbow road crossings were installed in Limerick.

The first Parade began at Pery Square circling O’Connell Street and back to Leamy House where Myles Breen hosted the festival's Tea Dance. 2008 was also the first year the national 300ft Pride Flag was unveiled and was carried as part of the parade in Limerick.

In 2025, Limerick Pride and The Outing Festival were successful in their bid to hold EuroPride in 2028. The first time the event takes place in Ireland.

== See also ==
- List of LGBT events
- LGBT rights in the Republic of Ireland
