= Patrick Street, Limerick =

Patrick Street
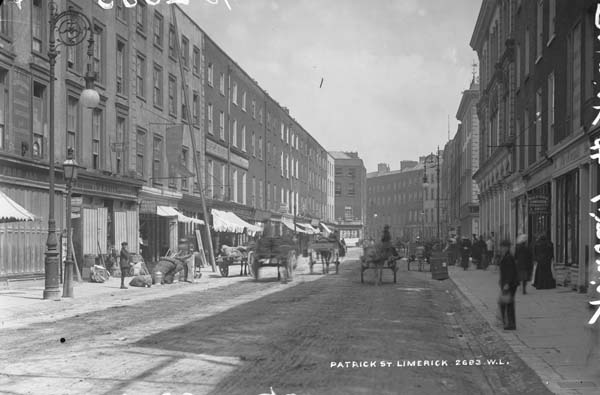
- Patrick Street, c.1880-1914
- Interactive map of Patrick Street
- Native name: Sráid Phádraig (Irish)
- Namesake: Patrick Arthur
- Length: 180 m (590 ft)
- Width: 18 metres (59 ft)
- Location: Limerick, Ireland
- Postal code: V94
- Coordinates: 52.66503°N 8.625319°W
- northeast end: Rutland Street, Francis Street
- southwest end: O'Connell Street, Denmark Street

Other
- Known for: Arthur's Quay Shopping Centre, restaurants, pubs

Patrick Street (Irish: Sráid Phádraig) is a street in central Limerick, Ireland. The street forms part of the main central thoroughfare of the city which incorporates Patrick Street, Rutland Street and O'Connell Street. The street is named after Patrick "Patt" Arthur (1717–1799), a member of the prominent Arthur family at the time. The streets of Francis Street, Ellen Street and Arthur's Quay are also named after the Arthur family.

The Victorian-era soprano, Catherine Hayes, was born at 4 Patrick Street in 1818.

Patrick Street saw a boost in the early 1990s with the opening of Arthur's Quay Shopping Centre in 1989. Until the late 1990s, the street was home to many different local businesses, however this dwindled down during the 2000s.

As of 2024, Patrick Street has a number of shops and hospitality establishments, including cultural establishment Ormston House on the corner of Patrick Street and Ellen Street. The Opera Centre development is under construction which incorporates Patrick Street and adjoining Ellen Street, Rutland Street and nearby Michael Street.
