= Carol Tambor Best of Edinburgh Award =

The Carol Tambor Best of Edinburgh Award is a theater prize given annually at the Edinburgh Festival Fringe.

== History ==
The Award has presented by the Carol Tambor Theatrical Foundation since 2004. In a formal agreement with the Fringe Society, it will be given in perpetuity.

== Rules ==
All productions which receive a four or five star review in The Scotsman newspaper and have not previously been presented in New York City are eligible for the prize.

The winner is announced at The Scotsman's final Fringe First Award ceremony, which is held on the final Friday morning of the Festival Fringe. The winner receives a four-week run at an Off-Broadway Theater in New York, all expenses paid, including: visa expenses; transportation for cast, crew and props; hotel for cast and crew; per diems; guaranteed stipend; and net box office receipts.

The run in New York coincides with the Association of Performing Arts Presenters convention each January for additional exposure and opportunity for transfers to other theaters. The Foundation takes no commercial interest in the future of the production.

== Prizewinners ==
The previous winners are:

- 2004: Sisters, Such Devoted Sisters by Russell Barr; and Rosebud by Mark Jenkins
- 2005: Absence and Presence by Andrew Dawson
- 2006: Goodness by Michael Redhill
- 2007: Between the Devil and the Deep Blue Sea by 1927
- 2008: Eight by Ella Hickson
- 2009: Little Gem by Elaine Murphy
- 2010: Ovid's Metamorphoses, by Pants on Fire
- 2011: Leo, by Circle of Eleven
- 2012: Mies Julie by Yaël Farber; Midsummer by David Greig
- 2013: The Events by David Greig
- 2014: Object Lesson, by Geoff Sobelle
- 2015: Key Change by Catrina McHugh
- 2016: Life According to Saki by Katherine Rundell
- 2017: The Flying Lovers of Vitebsk by Kneehigh; Borders by Henry Naylor
- 2018: Ulster American by David Ireland
- 2019: Mouthpiece by Keiran Hurley
  - Shortlisted: Big Bite-Size Breakfast Show by White Room Theatre; Burgerz by performance Travis Alabanza; Dispatches on the Red Dress by Rowan Rheingans, and Knot by Nikki Rummer and JD Broussé
