= Richard Harris International Film Festival =

Annual event in Limerick, Ireland

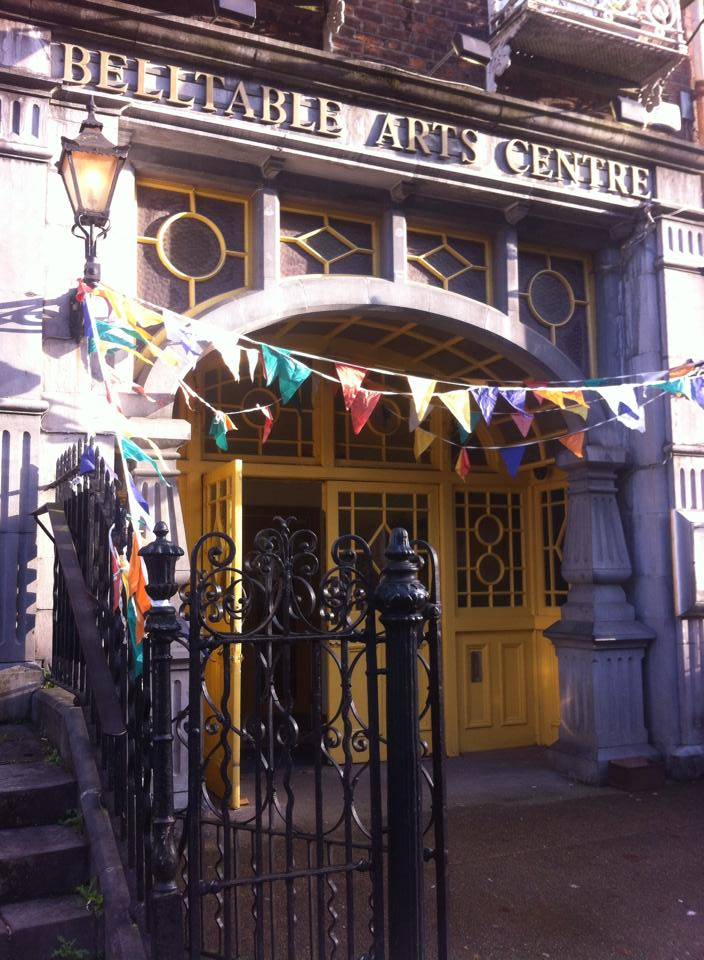
- Belltable Arts Centre, 69 O'Connell Street, Limerick, usual venue for RHIFF
- Location: Limerick, Ireland
- Founded: 2013
- Founded by: Rob Gill, Sylvia Moore Eleanor McSherry, Zeb Moore
- Most recent: 2023
- Festival date: October
- Language: English, Irish, others
- Website: richardharrisfilmfestival.com

The Richard Harris International Film Festival (RHIFF) was an annual film festival held in Limerick, Ireland, named for the actor Richard Harris (1930–2002), a native of the city. The festival was affiliated with the Irish Film and Television Academy and took place in late October every year.

== History ==
=== 2013 ===
The Richard Harris International Film Festival was established in 2013 by Rob Gill, Sylvia Moore Eleanor McSherry and Zeb Moore. For the first festival, the Irish film Life's a Breeze was shown, along with Harris' This Sporting Life, and several shorts. Harris memorabilia was displayed at Christ Church, United Presbyterian and Methodist.

=== 2014 ===
The second festival was held at 69 O'Connell Street; films shown included What Richard Did and Starred Up. The first Richard Harris Outstanding Talent Award was given to Jack Reynor.

=== 2015 ===
Composer Patrick Cassidy received the Outstanding Talent Award.

=== 2016 ===
For the first time, the festival was partnered with the Harris estate. Fionnula Flanagan received the Outstanding Talent Award.

=== 2017 ===
In 2017, RHIFF partnered with Shift72 to produce RHIFFTV, an online streaming platform. Dominic West received the Outstanding Talent Award. Ukrainian animated fantasy The Stolen Princess won the overall Best Film prize.

=== 2018 ===
In 2018, Patrick Bergin received the Outstanding Talent Award. Detainment, later nominated for the Academy Award for Best Live Action Short Film, won best film overall.

=== 2019 ===
120 films from 30 countries were shown over seven days. Moe Dunford received the Outstanding Talent Award. The festival included the iMET (Interactive Media Entertainment and Technology) summit virtual reality experience. The Millennium Theatre in Limerick Institute of Technology was used for screenings. Bellingcat: Truth in a Post-Truth World won Best Film.

=== 2020 ===
Due to the COVID-19 pandemic, no physical festival could take place. Jim Sheridan received the Outstanding Talent Award. The Winter Lake was Best Feature Film.

=== 2021 ===
Again there was no physical festival, due to COVID. Colin Farrell received the Richard Harris Outstanding Talent Award. Best Feature Film went to Save Me from Everything (also released as Don't Talk to Strangers).

=== 2022 ===
The physical festival returned with screenings at 69 O'Connell Street and the Commercial. Kenneth Branagh received the inaugural Lifetime Achievement Award. The Man in the Hat won Best Feature Film.

=== 2023 ===
111 shorts and features were screened in Omniplex Limerick; UCH, The Commercial & the International Rugby Experience. Jamie Dornan received the Outstanding Talent Award, while The Cost won Best Film.

=== End ===
The 2024 festival was postponed until "early Spring 2025" but never took place, nor was it held in 2026.

== See also ==
- List of film festivals
