= Cruises Street, Limerick =

Shopping street in Limerick, Ireland

Cruises Street
- Cruise's Street
- Interactive map of Cruises Street
- Native name: Sráid an Chrúisigh (Irish)
- Namesake: Cruise's Royal Hotel
- Length: 160 m (520 ft)
- Width: 10 metres (33 ft)
- Location: Limerick, Ireland
- Postal code: V94
- Coordinates: 52.66385°N 8.625199°W
- northwest end: O'Connell Street
- southeast end: Chapel Street

Construction
- Construction start: 4 November 1991
- Inauguration: 1992

Other
- Known for: shops

Cruises Street (Irish: Sráid an Chrúisigh; also spelled Cruise's) is a main shopping street of Limerick, Ireland. The street takes its name from Cruises Royal Hotel, the once well known Limerick landmark that stood where Cruises Street is now. Cruise's Hotel opened in 1791 and for over 200 years provided a focal point and an entertainment venue for Limerick people and visitors to the city for generations. The hotel was very well known throughout the country which fronted onto O'Connell Street. Daniel O'Connell, the famous Irish political leader in the 19th Century stayed at the hotel. It also had a presidential suite as Presidents and dignitaries who visited Limerick, regularly stayed there. The Hotel was demolished in 1991 to make way for the new pedestrianised street which opened in late 1992.

The street is relatively plain in layout and starts at a junction off O'Connell Street and runs in parallel to Denmark Street to its north and William Street which is to its south. At the centre of the street is a small square called Quimper Square. The street terminates at Chapel Lane which runs perpendicular to the street and connects to Denmark Street and William Street. A small laneway (Todd's Bow) also connects to William Street and Denmark Street from Quimper Square.

The 2008 financial crash, the economic downturn, and the increase in shopping facilities in suburban areas of Limerick resulted in a number of shop closures and a reduction of footfall on the street. In recent years, the street has seen a rise in footfall again and new businesses have moved into the area.

Retail Stores on Cruises Street (as of 2026)

- Three
- Easons
- Boots
- Vision Ireland
- Therapie/Optilase
- CEX
- Silver Wood
- Golden Discs
- River Island
- Flying Tiger
- New Look
- Specsavers
- Superdrug
- JD Sports
- Jack & Jones
- Elverys Sports
- O'Connors Café
- Foot Locker
- Costa Coffee
- Trailfinders
- ToGo

Stores no longer trading on Cruises Street

- Ann Summers
- Virgin Media
- Glitzi Bitz
- McDonald's
- Monsoon
- Wallis
- Thorntons
- Champion Sports (now JD Sports)
- Argos
- Next
- Dorothy Perkins
- Evans
- Heirlooms
- Hickeys
- Game
- Irish Nationwide
- Mothercare
- Vodafone
- HMV
- Early Learning Centre

In 2017, the street celebrated its 25th birthday.
