= Limerick Museum =

Municipal museum in Limerick City, Ireland

- Músaem Luimnigh
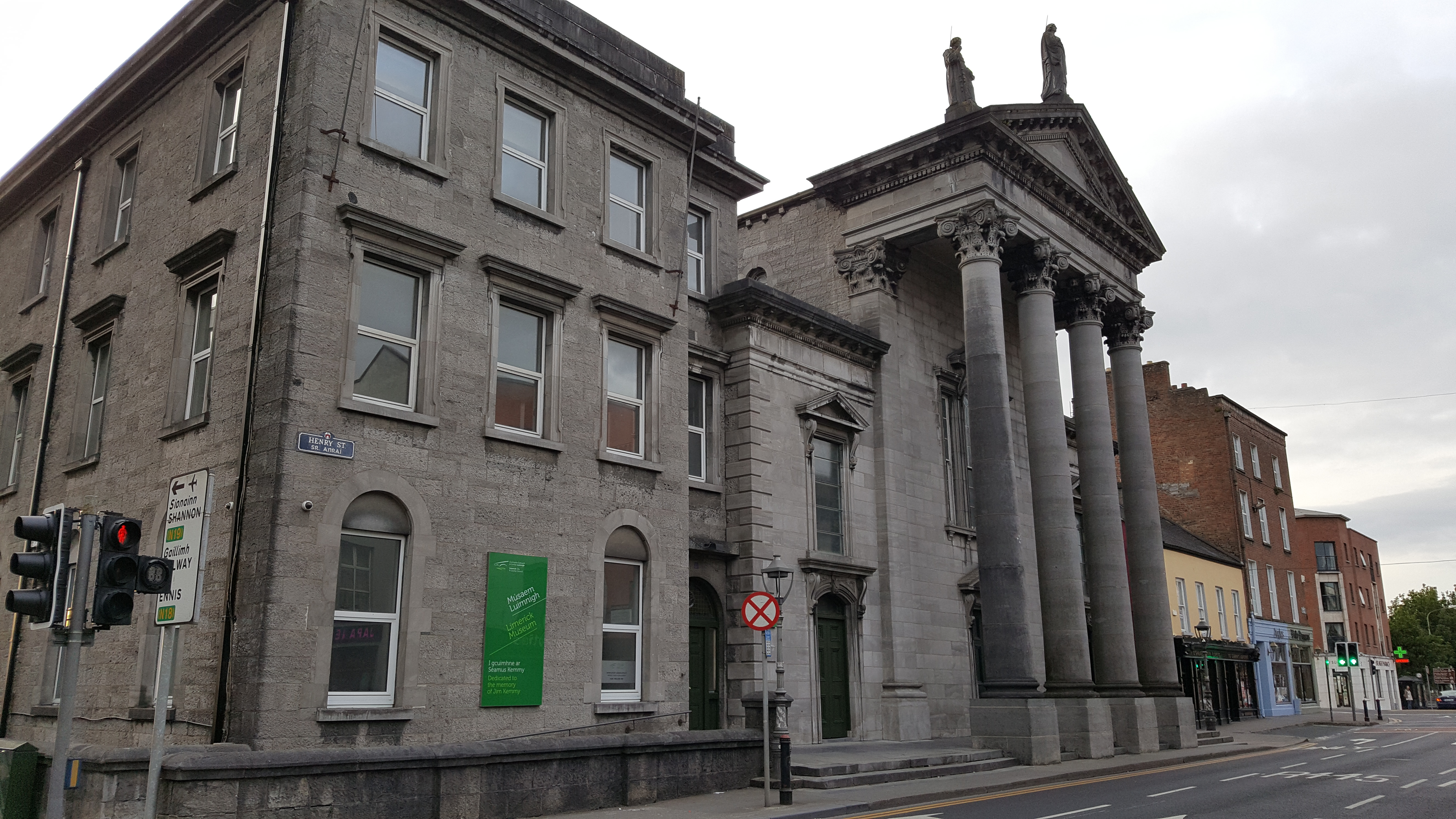
- Front façade of the Limerick Museum

- Location within Ireland
- Former name: Jim Kemmy Municipal Museum
- Established: 1907; 119 years ago
- Location: Henry Street, Limerick, Ireland
- Coordinates: 52.6641°N 8.6288°W
- Collection size: Over 60,000 objects
- Website: limerick.ie/limerick-museum

Limerick Museum (Irish: Músaem Luimnigh), previously known as the Jim Kemmy Municipal Museum, is a city museum in Limerick, Ireland.

== Foundation ==
The Limerick Museum was founded in 1907 and originally accommodated in the Carnegie Free Library and Museum building (established by Andrew Carnegie on Pery Square). Limerick Museum opened to the public in 1916 and remained in Pery Square until 1975. In 1979, the museum relocated to two restored houses in John Square. In 1998 the museum was moved again this time to Castle Lane where it opened to the public in 1999. In 2012, the museum was moved to a temporary location Civic Buildings, Merchant's Quay due to the refurbishment and expansion of King John's Castle. In May 2017, it moved to the present location in the old Franciscans Friary on Henry Street.

The museum is run by Limerick City and County Council.

Limerick Museum received national recognition as a museum under the Cultural Institution Act 1997, which allowed it to become a designated museums of the collection of archaeological material. Before 1977 the Limerick city librarian was also the curator. Since then, the full-time museum curators included: Larry Walsh (1977–2012), Brian Hodkinson (2012–2017) and Dr Matthew Potter (2017–present).

It has a collection of sixty-two thousand objects gathered through donations, purchase and long-term loan. In 2004, it became the first local authority in the state to have an online catalogue. In recent years, the number of visitors has increased from 13,000 in 2017 to 23,000 in 2018.

== Exhibitions ==
The first exhibition was in 1940 to commemorate the centenary of the death of Limerick novelist Gerald Griffin. Since then there have been a series of exhibitions on various aspects of Limerick's history and culture. This gives an opportunity for the rotation of objects within the collection by topic. For example, in the Retrospective Exhibition (2014) the Charter of the City signed by King Charles II of England, a sword given to the city by Queen Elizabeth I of England as well as many other interesting items relating to civic life in the city were on display.

== Limerick Museum and Archives ==
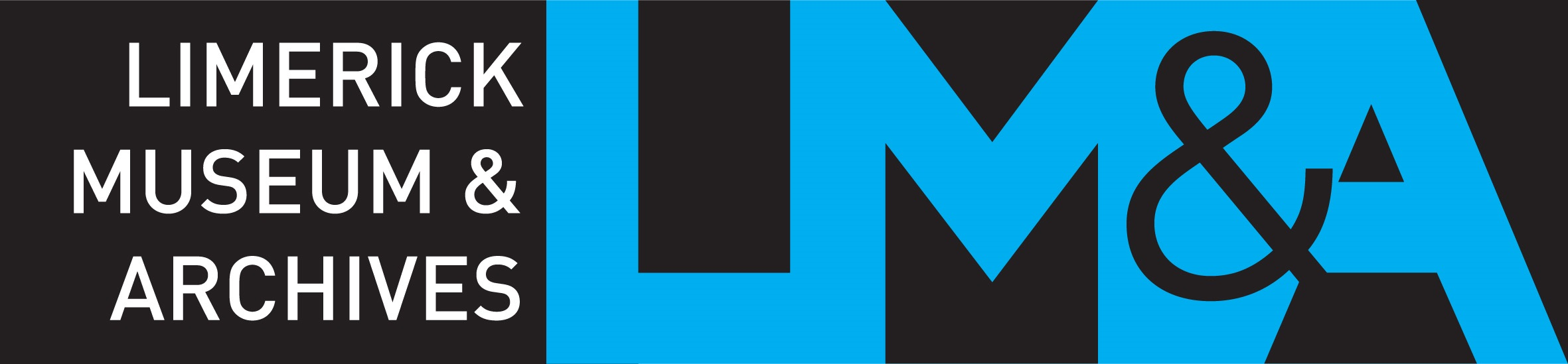
Logo of the joint Limerick Museum and Archives

Limerick Museum and Archives (LM&A) was a partnership between the Limerick Museum and the Limerick Archives, which existed from 2013 and 2017. Both are funded by Limerick City and County Council. The two institutions worked in collaboration with other public and private institutions on a number of projects, exhibitions and publications relating to the history of Limerick city and county. In May 2017, with the move of Limerick Museum to the old Franciscan Friary in Henry Street, the partnership was ended and the two institutions reverted to working separately.

Joint exhibitions included:

- 2013 St. Joseph's Hospital Exhibition
- 2014 Retrospective, Limerick City and Limerick County Council
- 2014 Haselbeck Collection
- 2014 From Limerick with Love with Limerick Leader, Shannon Airport, Limerick School of Art and Design
- 2014 Limerick Lace with interactive elements from University of Limerick
- 2015 Stand Up and Fight

== Noted items in the collection ==
- The largest meteorite ever to fall on Britain or Ireland lands at Adare, County Limerick
- A rare intact Codd-neck bottle
- Largest collection of Limerick lace
- Selection of 18th and 19th Century Limerick Silver
- Scabbard used by Lord Edward Fitzgerald at his arrest in 1798
- Three Blunderbuss firearms
- Stone Age and Iron Age Archaeological finds
- A range of clothing including a gentleman's suit c.1706

== See also ==
- History of Limerick
- Hunt Museum
- Limerick City Gallery of Art
- List of museums in the Republic of Ireland
