= William Keohane =

Irish poet and non-fiction writer from Limerick, Ireland

William Keohane is an Irish writer. His essays have been published in the Irish literary magazine The Stinging Fly, and men's magazine, British GQ.

== Biography ==
Keohane graduated with an MA in creative writing from University of Limerick, and also holds an undergraduate degree in psychology and sociology from the same university. He was New Irish Writing's poetry winner in March 2022. In 2021, he was shortlisted for the Patrick Kavanagh Poetry Award and received a Literature Bursary Award from the Arts Council. He was selected for the Poetry Ireland Introductions series.

In 2023, he was announced as guest editor of Trumpet, an annual literary pamphlet. As of 2022, Keohane is the current writer-in-residence at Ormston House, Limerick. He has held residencies in Tin House, Portland, Oregon, Cill Rialaig, County Kerry, and SÍM in Reykjavík, Iceland.

Keohane was invited to speak at Museum of Literature Ireland for the event celebrating 100 years of James Joyce's Ulysses in 2022. He performed a reading of a sequence of 52 poems in the Belltable Arts Centre, Waterford Institute of Technology and Crawford Art Gallery. The series, 'Boxing Day', reflects on Keohane's experience of gender transition. In November 2022, he collaborated with the composer Ailís Ní Ríain and students in the University of Galway on the performance "Reflections on Loss: Poetry, Music and Performance".

In May 2021, Keohane founded Trans Limerick Community (TLC), a voluntary group that support trans people in the Limerick area and highlighting issues around access to appropriate healthcare and mental health support. He has spoken out about his own experiences in accessing gender affirming healthcare, and the need to travel outside Ireland to do so. He was invited to speak about TLC at Denise Chaila's concert at King John's Castle, Limerick in August 2022, when he also read two of his poems.

== Selected publications ==
- 'Three Strands' in The Stinging Fly, issue 47: winter 2022.
- 'The story of a man’s face' in British GQ, July/August 2022.
- 'Postcard' and 'Anniversary' in the Irish Independent, March 2022.
- 'Cratloe Wood Lake' in Banshee, issue #12: autumn/winter 2021.
- 'Top surgery' in Poetry Ireland Review, Issue 134, Sept 2021.
