= Sharon Slater =

Irish historian and author

- Education: University of Limerick
- Occupation: Historian
- Writing career
- Genre: Non-fiction

Sharon Slater is an Irish historian and author. Her work primarily focuses on the history of Limerick, Ireland using the name Limerick's Life. Following a mentorship from Frank Prendergast she attended the University of Limerick and received an MA in Local History.

She is currently Historian-in-Residence at Ormston House. She writes for the Limerick Post. She previously wrote for the Limerick Leader (2018), Limerick Life Newspaper (2016-2017), Limerick Magazine (2015-2016). She has appeared as a history expert on television and radio including Creedon's Shannon, Doc on One, and RTÉ lyric fm.

In 2018, she was recognised with a mayoral reception, by Councillor Sean Lynch, Mayor of the Metropolitan District of Limerick, for her work to promote Limerick's history. She was awarded the National Heritage Hero Award for 2017 from Heritage Council Ireland. In 2015, she was awarded a Limerick Person of the Month for her contribution to the history and heritage of Limerick city. In June 2022, she was appointed Limerick Pride 2022 Grand Marshal. She was part of the bid team involved in securing EuroPride for Limerick and Clare in 2028.

In 2024, Slater wrote the foreword for The Ballad of Thomas Patrick Downing. The book, written by Des Ryan, tells the story of a Limerick man who fought and died with General Custer at the Battle of the Little Bighorn. Her work on the life of Hollywood Star Constance Smith culminated in a documentary on TG4, a memorial star by artist Mary Conroy, and play by Ann Blake and Joanne Ryan.

== Selected publications ==
- River Notes: - Opera in Limerick (Limerick: Limerick Opera Festival, 2024).
- 100 Women of Limerick (Limerick: Ormston House, 2022).
- The A-Z of Curious County Limerick (Dublin: History Press, 2021).
- An Illustrated Guide to Limerick City (Illustrated by Nesta FitzGerald) (Dublin: Irish Georgian Society, 2018).
- A Stitch In Time - A History of Limerick's Clothing Factory (Limerick: Limerick Archives, 2017).
- Limerick in Old Photographs (Dublin: History Press, 2016).
- Limerick's Merchants, Traders and Shakers: Celebrating Two Centuries of Enterprise (Joint Author with Matthew Potter) (Limerick: Limerick Chamber of Commerce, 2015).
- The Little Book of Limerick (Dublin: History Press, 2013).
