= Sarsfield Street, Limerick =

Street in Limerick, Ireland

Sarsfield Street
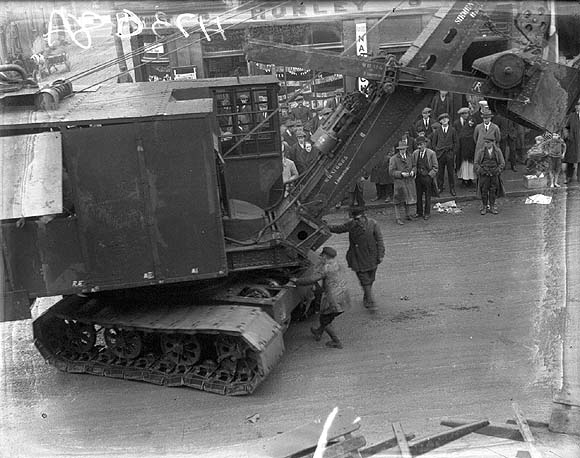
- Steam shovel at 8 Sarsfield Street, 1928
- Interactive map of Sarsfield Street
- Native name: Sráid an tSáirséalaigh (Irish)
- Former name: Brunswick Street
- Namesake: Patrick Sarsfield, 1st Earl of Lucan
- Length: 200 m (660 ft)
- Width: 18 metres (59 ft)
- Location: Limerick, Ireland
- Postal code: V94
- Coordinates: 52.664325°N 8.628001°W
- northwest end: Sarsfield Bridge, Harvey's Quay
- southeast end: William Street, O'Connell Street

Other
- Known for: shops

Sarsfield Street is a street in Limerick, Ireland. The street commences at Sarsfield Bridge (which crosses the River Shannon) and continues in a south east direction forming a crossroads junction with Liddy Street (to the north) and Henry Street (to the south). The street continues towards its junction with O'Connell Street where it ends. Sarsfield Street along with William Street forms an overall thoroughfare that bisects Limerick City Centre from west to east. O'Connell Street in turn bisects the city centre from north to south. The street prior to the construction of the Limerick Southern Ring Road and the Shannon Bridge was the start of the main N18 road between Limerick (and the south & south east) and Galway.

The street was originally known as Brunswick Street until the early 20th century. It was renamed after Patrick Sarsfield the first Earl of Lucan and who was the Irish Jacobite leader in the Siege of Limerick (1690). Sarsfield arranged the subsequent Treaty of Limerick.

In the early 21st century, Sarsfield Street saw a number of shop closures. Dunnes Stores, which had a large shopping complex on the street, closed in 2008 and moved to nearby Henry Street. Debenhams (formerly Roches Stores) closed in 2020 due to the company entering liquidation and closing all of its Irish stores. As of 2024, the street has seen a boost of mixed retail, hospitality and planned accommodation.

In May 2019, the University of Limerick purchased the former Dunnes Stores building on the street from the retail company for €8 million. In 2021, the university redeveloped the building to house its new 'FabLab' and city centre campus, followed by a further facelift in 2022. In 2023, Limerick City and County Council granted planning permission to UL to rezone the former Dunnes Stores building from retail to educational use.
