= Jackie McCarthy-O'Brien =

Irish footballer and rugby player

Jacqueline “Jackie” McCarthy O'Brien is a former Irish International football and rugby player. She played forward for Republic of Ireland women's national football team. McCarthy O'Brien represented Ireland 13 times each in soccer (1981–1993) and rugby (1994–1998). She was the country's first mixed-race player in both games.

== Biography ==
Born Jacqueline O'Halloran in Birmingham, England in 1961 to an Irish mother and Jamaican father, she moved to Limerick, Ireland before her first birthday. She spent a part of her childhood in Mount Saint Vincent industrial school, Limerick. In 1966, her mother married All-Ireland handball champion Mickey O’Brien. In 2023, she was awarded a one-off commemorative cap by the Football Association of Ireland as part of the Women's National Team's 50-year anniversary celebration.

In 2019, she was featured in the Vodafone Ireland advert campaign "Ireland's Ball" featuring sports people from each of the 32 counties. This campaign to celebrate the creation of a unique rugby ball, which was designed with a bespoke grip containing the fingerprints of 32 different people from every county in Ireland, symbolising the connection to each other and to Irish rugby. Her involvement in rugby inspired Joy Neville to participate in the sport.

A vocal advocate against racism, in 2021, she appeared on the Claire Byrne show speaking on the subject. She is openly gay and participated in Limerick Pride events. She was part of the bid team involved in securing EuroPride for Limerick and Clare in 2028. Her daughter Sam McCarthy is also a football player.

== Career ==
She was in the squad for a friendly against England in 1987. As part of the Euro qualifying team in 1991, she travelled from Limerick to Dublin for training for seven weeks. In 1992, she was listed as a Limerick United player. In a 2019 Limerick Leader interview, she recalled winning 13 caps for Ireland from 1983 to 1994 with a debut against Northern Ireland at Chimney Corner FC.

After retiring from football at 33 years old, she switched to Rugby Union and played for Munster and won 13 caps for Ireland, including at the 1998 World Cup, where World Rugby billed her as “Jackie O’Brian”.

In 2024 in an RTÉ/Sunday Independent investigation she opened up about the abuse she faced while on the women's soccer team.

== Autobiography ==
In October 2025 McCarthy-O'Brien released her memoir titled, We Made It, Kid.
