= Stephen Kinsella =

Irish economist

Stephen Kinsella (born August 17, 1978) is an Irish economist. He is Professor of Economics at the University of Limerick's Kemmy Business School in Ireland and a columnist with The Currency News and was previously a columnist for the Sunday Business Post and the Irish Independent. He has written a number of books about the Irish economy. He is associated with the Post Keynesian school of economic thought in general and the development of stock flow consistent models in particular. He co-hosts a podcast Ann & Steve Talk Stuff, with Ann Blake.

== Education ==
Kinsella has a BA from Trinity College, Dublin, a PhD from NUI, Galway, and a second PhD from the New School for Social Research.
