= Richard Malone (artist) =

Irish artist

- Born: Wexford, Ireland
- Education: Central Saint Martins

Richard Malone is an Irish artist and designer from Wexford, Ireland.

== Early life and background ==
Richard Malone was born in 1990 and grew up in Wexford, Ireland. He often references his working class upbringing and Irish identity as significant influences in his work. Before his formal education in art, Malone worked with his father on building sites and began his initial studies in art at Waterford College of Further Education.

== Artistic career ==
Malone graduated from Central Saint Martins in 2014. Following his graduation, his collection was purchased by Brown Thomas in Dublin. In 2017, his work was featured in the Museum of Modern Art's "Is Fashion Modern?" exhibition. In 2019, Malone was a finalist for the LVMH Prize. and, in 2020, won the Woolmark Prize. In February 2021, Malone was shortlisted as a finalist for the BFC/Vogue Designer Fashion Fund.

Malone's creative practice spans across various mediums such as sculpture, installation, performance, drawing, costume, and garment making. His work often delves into gendered labor practices to explore themes of queerness, class, place, and otherness. In 2023, Malone received the Golden Fleece Award.

His essays and letters have been featured in British Vogue and Luncheon magazine. In 2022, an exhibit showcasing Malone's poems and self-portraits titled "Out in the World: Ireland’s LGBTQ+ Diaspora" was held at EPIC The Irish Emigration Museum.

Recent solo exhibitions include those at the National Gallery of Ireland in Dublin, Ormston House in Limerick, and in 2023, his most extensive sculptural mobile was displayed at the Royal Academy in London. Malone often emphasizes the importance of his identity as a "queer, working class immigrant from rural Ireland." He acknowledges the value of the skills he learned in rural Ireland – including stitching, curtain making, welding, and metal bending.

In 2022, he was the artist in residence at the National Gallery of Ireland in Dublin, responding to the gallery's premiere exhibition of Alberto Giacometti in Ireland.

Various institutions, including the Museum of Modern Art in New York, the Victoria and Albert Museum in London, and the National Gallery of Victoria in Melbourne, hold Malone's work. A portrait of Malone by Howard Tangye is part of the National Portrait Gallery, London.

From 2020 to 2022, Malone curated the touring exhibition "Making and Momentum: In Conversation with Eileen Gray". This exhibition celebrated modernism in Ireland and the influence of Irish craftsmanship globally. The show concluded in Wexford, where select works were auctioned, raising funds for the restoration of Eileen Gray's work and the establishment of an artist's prize.
