= Henry Street, Limerick =

Henry Street
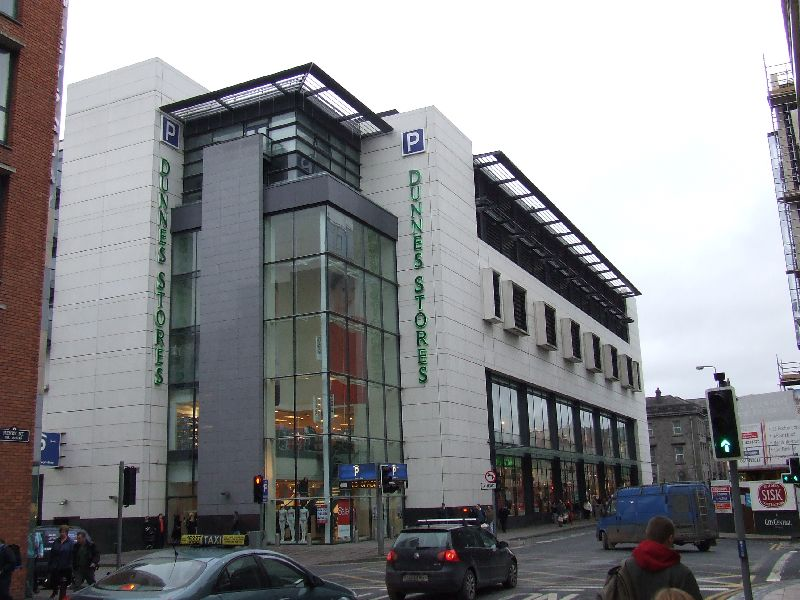
- Dunnes Stores, Henry Street
- Interactive map of Henry Street
- Native name: Sráid Anraí (Irish)
- Namesake: Edmund Henry Pery, 1st Earl of Limerick
- Length: 950 m (3,120 ft)
- Width: 23 metres (75 ft)
- Location: Limerick, Ireland
- Postal code: V94
- Coordinates: 52.661175°N 8.631476°W
- northeast end: Sarsfield Street, Liddy Street
- southwest end: St Alphonsus Street, St Gerard Street, South Circular Road

Other
- Known for: shops, Limerick Museum, restaurants

Henry Street (Irish: Sráid Anraí) is a street in Limerick, Ireland. The street is named after Edmund Henry Pery, 1st Earl of Limerick who had a house on the street but is currently occupied by the Hibernian Insurance Company. The street runs parallel to the River Shannon (to the west) and O'Connell Street (to the east).

The street was part of Edmund Sexton Pery's plans for Newtown Pery. However, much of the street remained undeveloped in comparison to other areas of Limerick at that time. The Bishop of Limerick’s residence is also found along this street, and opposite the former Bishop’s Palace was the General Post Office. The Franciscan Church, though currently closed, is located on the street and is a fine imposing structure near the junction with Bedford Row. A Presbyterian Church was also previously located on the street near the junction with Mallow Street, now it has been converted into offices.

The old illustrious 1000 seater Savoy Theatre that occupied the block between Bedford Row and Shannon Street was demolished and replaced by the modern 5-star Savoy Hotel in 2008. Dunnes Stores opened a flagship store alongside a multi-storey car park on the site of Spaights (the building it replaced) in 2001.

Since 2000, the street has changed significantly, with the streets aesthetics changed to mirror the development of other streets in the city centre. As of 2024, the street is home to many different mixed developments, such as retail, offices (Gardens International development. 1 Bishops Quay was occupied by Verizon, Holmes, O'Malley & Sexton Solicitors, HAP National Head Office operated by Limerick City and County Council etc.) and apartment blocks on Henry Street and adjacent streets.

There is a plaque dedicated to Seán South outside his birthplace on Henry Street.
