= Catherine Hayes (soprano) =

Irish operatic soprano

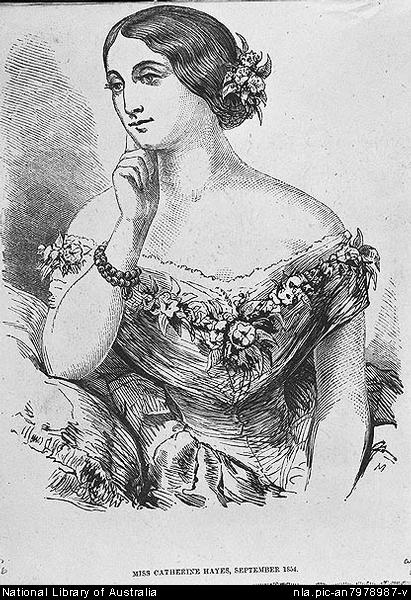
- Miss Catherine Hayes, September 1854, by George W. Mason
- Born: Limerick City, Ireland
- Baptised: 8 November 1818
- Died: 11 August 1861
- Occupation: Operatic soprano

Catherine Hayes, married name Catherine Bushnell, (1818? – 11 August 1861) (Note: Boase, writing in 1891, gives Hayes' date of birth as 29 October 1825; however, the 1885–1900 Dictionary of National Biography is well-known for inaccuracies. Shoesmith, writing in 1972, notes in the Australian Dictionary of Biography that Hayes was baptized on 8 November 1818; this confirms Hayes was alive 7 years before 1825, and strongly suggests she was born in 1818.) was a world-famous Irish soprano of the Victorian era. According to London's Daily Express, "Hayes was the 'Madonna' of her day; she was the 19th-century operatic equivalent of the world's most famous pop star." (Note: Quoted in Noy.)

== Biography ==
=== Youth in Limerick and education in Dublin and Paris (1818–1845) ===
Hayes was baptised on 8 November 1818, in St Mary's Cathedral, Limerick. She was born of humble Anglo-Irish parentage at 4 Patrick Street, Limerick. Her father was the musician Arthur Williamson Hayes; abandoned the family in 1823, and Catherine Hayes, aged 5, grew up very poor with her mother, Mary Carroll, and sister. Mary Carroll and Arthur Williamson Hayes were married on 18 January 1815, in St Michael's Church, Limerick. They had four children, Henrietta, Charles, Catherine, and William, who were all baptised in St Mary's Cathedral, Limerick.

In 1838, her vocal talents attracted the notice of Edmund Knox, the Church of Ireland bishop of Limerick. Edmund Knox resided next door to the Earl of Limerick, and heard Hayes singing casually in the back garden, and he was greatly impressed by the tone of her voice. He organized funding for Hayes to have vocal training in Limerick. She then gave private performances for the local Protestant Ascendancy.

Bishop Knox sought advice from the Pigott Family in Dublin, who recommended Hayes to study under Antonio Sapio in Dublin. Funds were procured to enable Hayes to study in Dublin under Sapio, from 1 April 1839 until August 1842. Hayes, at 20 years of age, set-out with her mother for Dublin on 1 April 1839 to commence her training. They stayed with her tutor in his residence at No.1 Percy Place.

Her first appearance took place on 1 May 1839 at Sapio's annual concert in the charitable fund-raising theatre at the Rotunda Hospital in Dublin (now the Gate Theatre), in a duet with Antonio Sapio singing "O'er shepard pipe" from Michael Balfe's opera, "Joan of arc".

On 15 January 1840, she sang in her native Limerick at Swinburn's great rooms under the patronage of Bishop Knox. On 5 February she had a second performance at Swinburns, assisted by George Frederick Handel Rogers. She performed frequently in Dublin, and soon raised her terms to ten guineas a concert.

One of the most important events in Hayes' young career occurred early in 1841 when she was invited to sing at another concert in Dublin, sponsored by J.P. Knight at the Long Rooms in Rotunda. The star of the evening was the celebrated Hungarian virtuoso pianist, Franz Liszt, then only 29 years of age, on his first tour of the British Isles.

Luigi Lablache, a bass singer in the 19th century, was visiting Dublin in August 1841. Hayes' tutor, Sapio, spoke to him about Hayes' talent and Lablache, not only agreed to hear her sing, but was highly impressed as well. Lablache recommended to Sapio that Hayes should study under the foremost singing teacher in Europe, Manuel Garcia, in Paris.

After hearing Grisi and Mario in Norma on 13 September 1841, she decided to come out on the lyric stage. A concert took place in Limerick to help raise the extra funds required for her to study abroad. Hayes stitched the money she had earned into her petticoat before heading off to Paris with her mother on 12 October 1842.

On arrival in Paris to Osborne's apartment on Rue St. George in the 9th District where many artists, musicians and writers lived. Their stay here was organised by Bishop Knox who knew the Osborne family, and Osborne was a choir master in St. Mary's cathedral. Osborne welcomed Hayes to Paris and became a lifelong friend who would later participate in some of her concerts.

Manuel Garcia had his studio at No.6 square D'Orleans just a short distance from Osborne's apartment. She studied with Garcia from October 1842 until March 1844. She did extensive studies on vocal exercises and learned to speak French during this time.

=== Further education and early performances in Milan, Marseilles, Vienna, and Venice (1845–1848) ===
At Milan she became the pupil of Felice Ronconi, (Note: Son of the tenor Domenico Ronconi) and through the intervention of Giuseppina Grassini was engaged for the Italian Opera House, Marseilles, where on 10 May 1846 she made her first appearance on the stage as Elvira in I puritani and was enthusiastically applauded.

After her return to Milan she continued her studies under Ronconi, until Morelli, the director of La Scala at Milan, offered her an engagement. Here her first character was Linda, and she was recalled twelve times by the audience. Her voice had now become a soprano of the sweetest quality, and of good compass, ascending with ease to D in alt. The upper notes were limpid, and like a well-tuned silver bell up to A. Her lower tones were the most beautiful ever heard in a real soprano, and her trill was remarkably good. She was a touching actress in all her standard parts. She was tall, with a fine figure, and graceful in her movements. Shortly after Hayes' performance at La Scala, Giuseppe Verdi became interested in her for one of his new operas.

She remained at Milan during the autumn of 1845 and the carnival of 1846, and took the characters of Lucia di Lammermoor (in which part she became the most sought-after performer of the age), Zora in Mosè in Egitto, Desdemona, and Amina. Later on in 1846 she sang in Vienna, and on the first night of the carnival of 1847 appeared in Venice in a poor opera composed for her by Malespino, a nobleman, entitled Albergo di Romano. Returning to Vienna, she took part in Estella di Murcia, expressly written for her in 1846 by Federico Ricci.

=== Mature performing career ===
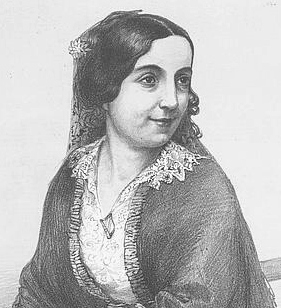
Catherine Hayes during her Australian tour

==== Performances in London, Dublin, and Rome (1849–1851) ====
After a tour of the Italian cities, Hayes returned to England in 1849, when Delafield engaged her for the season at a salary of £1,300. On 10 April she made her début at Covent Garden in Linda di Chamounix, and was received with much warmth.

At the close of the season, in June 1849, she sang before Queen Victoria at Buckingham Palace. "After an evening of Italian music, the Queen requested an encore. Catherine, with a mischievous grin it is reported, sang the beautiful Irish rebellion song, Kathleen Mavourneen."

On 5 November 1849 she appeared at a concert given by the Dublin Philharmonic Society, and afterwards at the Theatre Royal, Dublin, in Lucia, when the Edgardo was so badly played that an uproar ensued, and Sims Reeves, one of the audience, took his place on the stage.

Under Lumley's management Miss Hayes played Lucia at Her Majesty's Theatre, London, on 2 April 1850, but owing to ill health and other causes she was seldom seen during the remainder of the season.

At the carnival in Rome in 1851 she was engaged at the Teatro d'Apollone, and performed in Maria de Rohan for twelve nights, and received the diploma of the Academia di Santa Cecilia. From Rome she returned to London, where during the season of 1851 she was the star of the concert-room and of the performances of the Sacred Harmonic Society, singing in the oratorios of Handel, Haydn, and Mendelssohn.

==== Performances in the Americas (1851–1853) ====
Leaving England in September 1851, and first singing in New York on the 23rd of that month, she there, by the advice of William Avery Bushnell of Connecticut, an electioneering agent and former manager for the "Swedish Nightingale," Jenny Lind, forfeited £3,000, and gave Bushnell the management of her tour. Hayes also performed in Boston, Toronto, Philadelphia, Washington D.C., Charleston, Savannah, New Orleans, and forty-five other locations including the river towns along the Mississippi. Hayes "met presidents, statesmen and business leaders along the way."

P.T. Barnum sponsored Hayes' tour of California, where she was billed as "The Swan of Erin", and "The Hibernian Prima Donna". She sang "at San Francisco from November 1852 to May 1853, where her fees averaged £650 a month; the 'semi-civilised' gold miners bidding up to £1150 to hear her sing."

The newspaper Far West News wrote of her debut at San Francisco's American Theater in 1852 that "[l]ong and loud were the cheers and applause, which greeted her entrée … She acknowledged again and again the enthusiastic testimonial, and again and again the audience cheered and applauded … It was while standing at the foot-lights, amid the storm of applause, that our citizens had the first view of Miss Catherine Hayes … Miss Hayes is about thirty years of age. She is a graceful, queen-like person, of medium stature, with a fair oval face. Her features are regular, hair bright auburn, eyes blue, and her face wears an intellectual expression without much animation. She dresses with taste, and her manner is perfectly easy and self-possessed; her gesticulation appropriate and graceful."

During the spring of 1853, Hayes toured the California Gold Country. She "was a visitor to many mining camps, and even tried her hand at gold panning." The Nevada Journal newspaper of Nevada County, California wrote of her performance at the Alta Theater in Grass Valley, California on 18 April 1853 that Hayes' voice "broke forth in notes of most bewitching sweetness and harmony. The excitement of the audience increased to a furious extent, no doubt with proud ratification that they had heard for once in their lives, the voice that had awakened the admiration of the western world." Kate Hayes Street in Grass Valley is named for Hayes.

Hayes departed California for South America, and after visiting the principal cities (including Lima, Valparaíso, and Santiago) embarked for Australia.

==== Performances in Oceania and Asia (1854–1856) ====
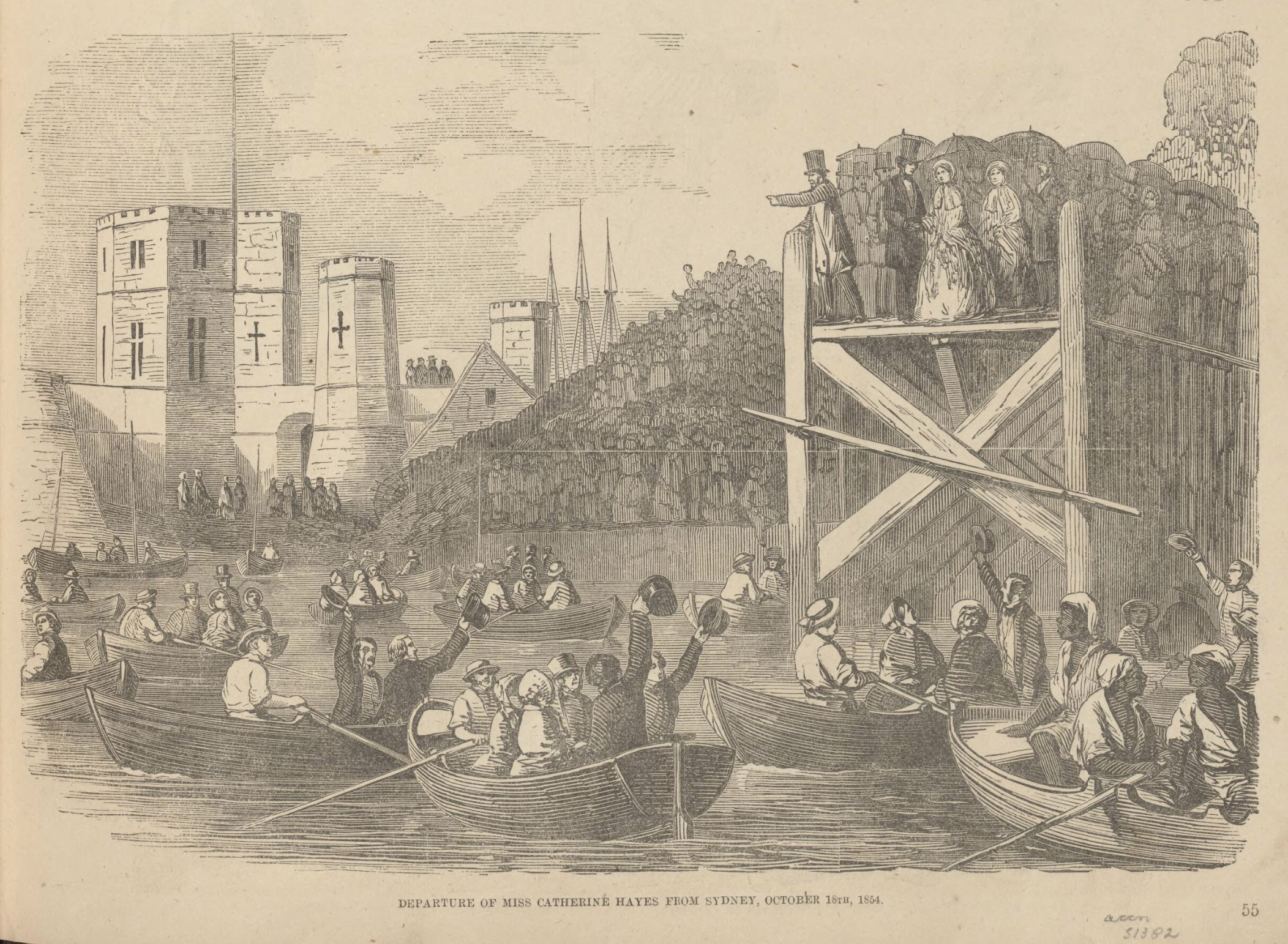
Catherine Hayes leaving Sydney on 18 October 1854

She gave concerts in the Sandwich Islands (present-day Hawaiian Islands), and arrived at Sydney in January 1854. Her arrival in Sydney caused "an excitement wholly unparalleled in the theatrical annals of this colony." Her performance at the Victoria Theatre (Note: Not to be confused with the many other halls called the Royal Victoria Theatre, the Royal Victoria in Sydney was founded in 1838, and burnt down in 1880.) on 3 October 1854 was enthusiastically received; in addition to her operatic performance, Sydney audiences very much appreciated her performances of ballads like "Home, Sweet Home" and "Oh, Steer My Bark to Erin's Isle." At a thronged 18 October 1854 sendoff for Hayes at Sydney's Circular Quay, Judge Sir Roger Therry declared that Hayes would be recalled by Sydneysiders with "admiration, respect, and esteem.". Hayes donated the proceeds of her final concert in Sydney to the Asylum for Destitute Children at Randwick, which opened in 1858.

The Age newspaper called Hayes' first concert in the Queen's Theatre, (Note: Opened in 1845, the Queen's Theatre, Melbourne, was demolished in 1922.) Melbourne, "a great event in our local history." After a tour through Geelong and Adelaide, she departed for Calcutta, where she disembarked in January 1855 and performed for the British colonial military there. Due to the poor economic situation in Calcutta, she left for Batavia (present-day Jakarta) and Singapore before returning to Australia, where she performed again in Sydney and Melbourne.

=== Later life (1856–1861) ===
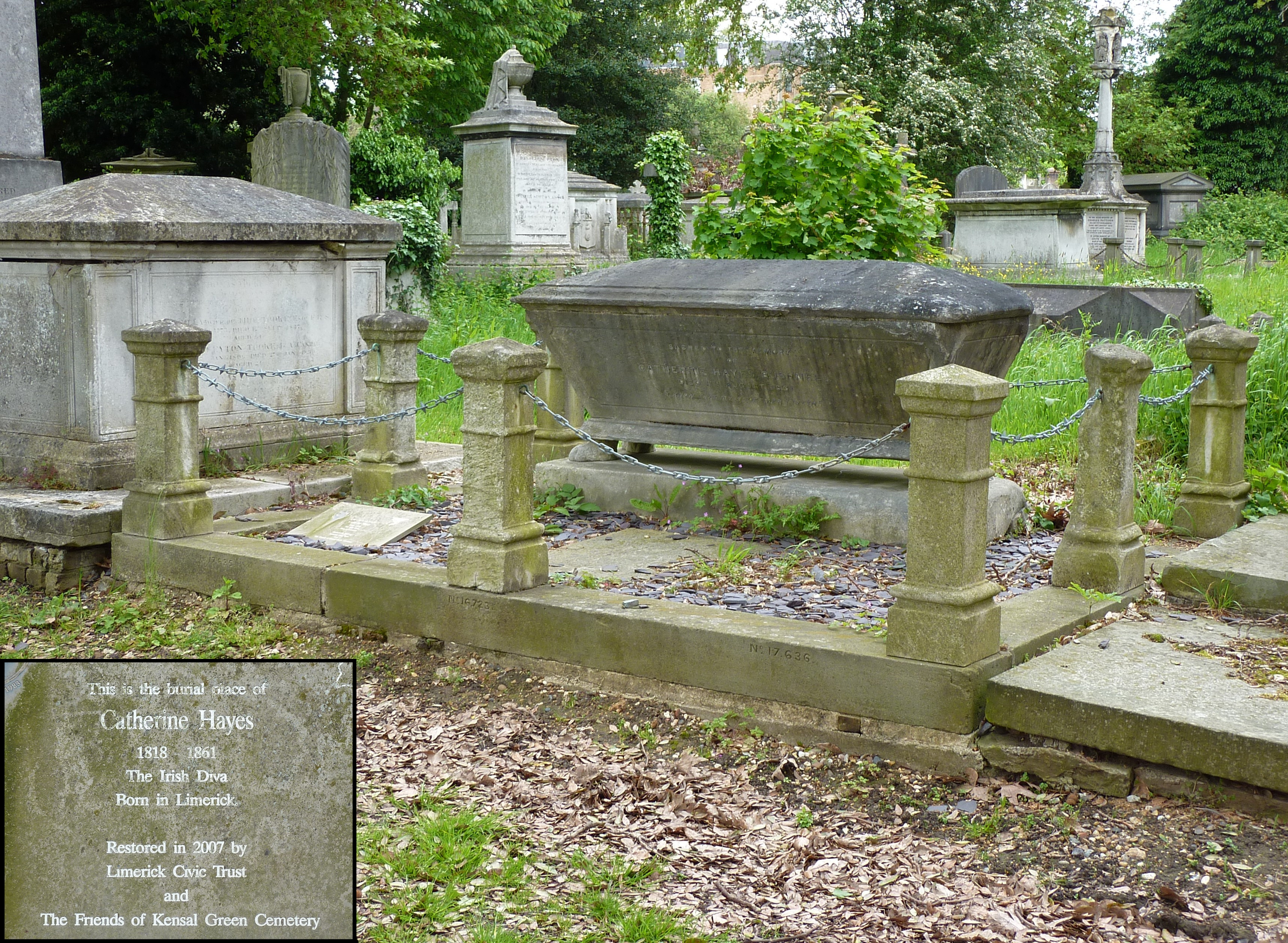
Catherine Hayes's grave at Kensal Green Cemetery, London, pictured in 2014

She returned to England in August 1856, after an absence of five years. That year, she lost $27,000 by the failure of Saunders & Brennon of San Francisco.

On 8 October 1857, at St. George's, Hanover Square, she married William Avery Bushnell. He soon fell into ill-health, and died at Biarritz, France, on 2 July 1858, aged 35. She appeared at Jullien's promenade concerts at Her Majesty's Theatre in 1857, when her ballad singing, the branch of art in which lay her greatest power, was much applauded. After her husband's death she took part in concerts in London and the country towns.

She died in the house of a friend, Henry Lee, at Roccles, Upper Sydenham, Kent, on 11 August 1861, and was buried in Kensal Green Cemetery on 17 August. Her will was proved on 26 August, the personalty being sworn under £16,000.

== Missing portrait ==
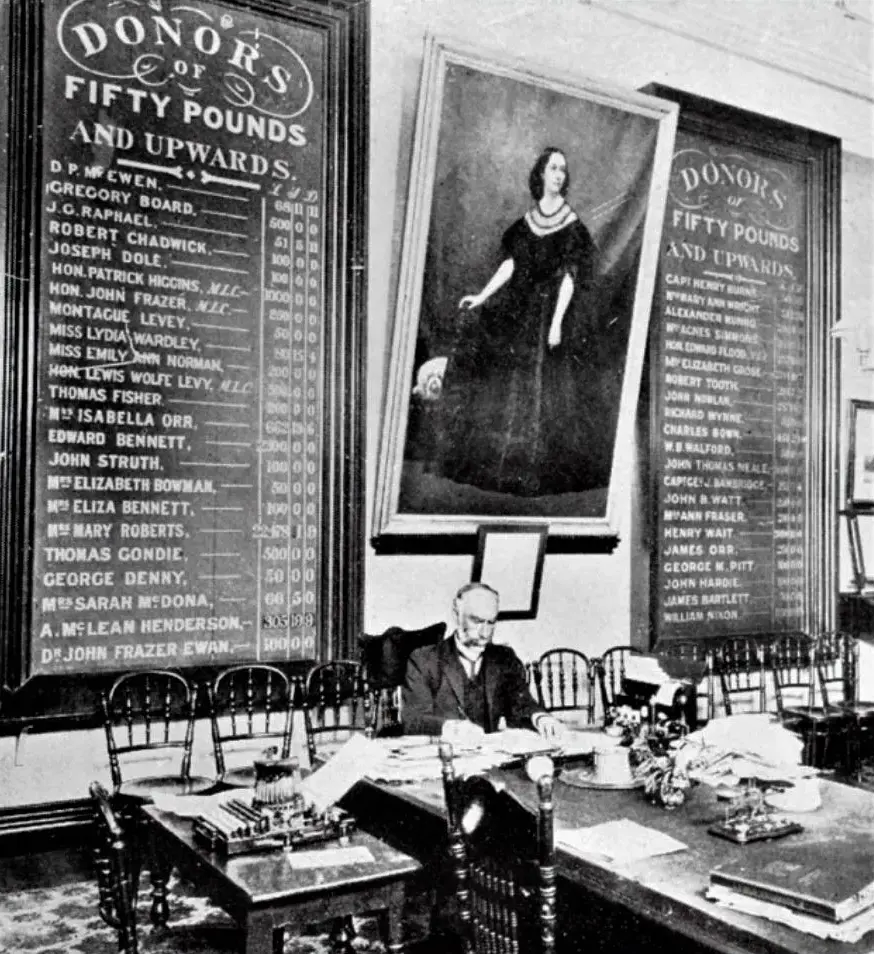
Newspaper photo showing Hayes' portrait (now lost) in the boardroom of the Randwick Asylum (The Protestant Standard, 7 November 1874)

As a key benefactress of the Asylum for Destitute Children at Randwick, Hayes commissioned a portrait of herself for display there, from the Italian painter Attilio Baccani. It measured 7 feet 11 inches (2.41 m) by 5 feet 2 inches (1.57 m). She died before it could be sent there, and for a time it was missing. It finally arrived in or around 1870, and was hung in the asylum's boardroom.

1915 the asylum was requisitioned for use as rehabilitation centre for soldiers wounded in the Gallipoli campaign. The painting was transferred to the Art Gallery of New South Wales, and in 1925 was relocated to Sydney Conservatorium of Music. Its present whereabouts is unknown.

== Grave restoration ==
Controversy arose in 2025 after Hayes' grave was painted by volunteers from the Limerick Association in London. The central stone monument was painted grey with black lettering, and the surrounding balustrade green and white. Cemetery authorities said the work had not been authorised, was not in keeping with the cemetery, and my have damaged the stonework.
