= Limerick Chamber =

Business representative organisation

Limerick Chamber of Commerce, also known as Limerick Chamber, was founded in 1805 in Limerick, Ireland. It is a business representative and lobbying organisation which supports approximately 450 members. As of 2026, the president was Maria Gleeson, Chief Operating Officer of Soul Tribe.

Initially established in 1805, the Limerick Chamber was formally constituted by charter on 2 June 1815. The organisation was incorporated by a Royal Charter by King George III, under the title of 'the Chamber of Commerce of Limerick'. In 1833, the chamber moved to its present premises at 96 O'Connell Street. It is one of the five oldest chambers of commerce in Ireland and the UK at the time of its foundation. During the first half of the nineteenth century, the chamber played a role in the development of Limerick Harbour and also assumed control over pilotage in the River Shannon and made payments to individuals who salvaged vessels and marked hazards in the estuary.

To mark its 200th centenary in 2015, Limerick Chamber published a book entitled Limerick's Merchants, Traders & Shakers – Celebrating two centuries of enterprise. It was edited by Matthew Potter and Sharon Slater.

== Notable former presidents ==
- Francis Spaight (1847–60)
- James Spaight (1871–92)
- Alexander William Shaw (1899-1905)
- Thomas Cleeve (1908)
- Ted Russell (1948–50)
- Patrick Kennedy (1979–80)

== See also ==
- Chambers Ireland
