= Myles Breen =

Irish actor and writer

- Born: September 2, 1964 (age 61); Limerick, Ireland
- Occupations: Actor, Director, Playwright
- Years active: 1987-Present
- Organization: Bottom Dog Theatre
- Known for: Language: Unbecoming A Lady

Myles Breen is an Irish actor, performer, writer and storyteller.

== Biography ==
Myles Breen was born and raised in Limerick City, Ireland, on September 2, 1964. As a child, he attended speech and drama classes and competed in Féile Luimnigh. He attended University College Cork in the early 1980s and was a member of the UCC Dramatic Society. He was a founding member of the Bottom Dog Theatre Company in 2008.

He was the playwright one-man show Language Unbecoming a Lady was originally produced in 2009 for Limerick Pride. It was later performed nationally and at the Origins Irish Festival in New York (2015), for which he won the best actor award at the festival. He also wrote The Bachelor of Kilkish (2014) which was originally performed in Lime Tree Theatre. He wrote and performed in A Wilde Fan (2021), an homage to Oscar Wilde. All three of these productions were directed by Liam O'Brien (Irish actor). Breen has made several television and film performances, including Killinaskully, The Clash of the Ash (1987 film), Northanger Abbey (2007 film), Corp & Anam (2011), and Harvey: The Monster Catcher (2012).

In 2014, he was honoured with a Limerick Person of the Month award. Two years later, he was selected as the Grand Marshall of the Limerick Pride Parade. He has played various roles with Island Theatre Co. such as Manus in ‘Translations’, Eugene in ‘Biloxi Blues’, Danny Mann in ‘The Colleen Bawn’, Claudius in ‘Hamlet’ and various roles in ‘Pig Town’ and ‘Under Milk Wood’. In 2016, Myles was awarded the honour of leading the Saint Patrick's Day Parade. In 2015, he led the Pride parade.

Myles’ other acting roles include Joxer in ‘Juno & the Paycock’, Antonio in ‘The Merchant of Venice’ (Steeple), Andrew Aguecheek in ‘Twelfth Night’ (Natural Shocks), Philly Cullen in ‘The Play boy of the Western World’ (Yew Tree ) and Heskie in ‘Love, Peace and Robbery’ (Magic Roundabout). He has also appeared with Daghdha, Animated State, Gallowglass, Quare Hawks, Graffiti, Aisling Ghear, Impact, and Teaspach.

In Modern times, Myles performs in the Irish Pantos, having performed in 15, including ‘Beauty and the Beast’, ‘Aladdin’, ‘Snow White’ (performed at CentreStage), ‘Cinderella’ (performed in the Olympia) and ‘Pinocchio’ (performed in the Everyman). Myles also writes and directs the annual ‘Creative Show’ event, put on by the Limerick Youth Theatre in collaboration with the Daughters of Charity. The Creative Show has run for 12 years being performed in University Concert Hall with Breen running all of them. In 2026, Myles Breen celebrated 30 consecutive years of performing in the Limerick Panto, revealing he has played the ‘Ugly Sister’ a total of 8 times.

== Films ==
Year	Title	Character	Type
1987	The Clash of the Ash	Willy	Feature
2006	Why The Irish Dance That Way	Businessman	Feature
2007	Northanger Abbey	Mr. King	Feature
2009	The Euthanizer	Leader	Short
2012	Harvey: The Monster Catcher	Harvey	Short
2014	Play It Again Son!	Film Director	Short
2015	Myles Breen: Unbecoming A Lady	Bobby	Short
2016	Day Off	Ronnie	Short
2016	Fow Jaw-Hit it Off	Drag Queen	Music Video
2016	Date: Time	Ronnie	Short
2016	Relax The Cacks: A Full Shim Film	Diarmuid	Short
2021	Shannon Banks	Litterbug	Short
2022	The 5 Flannery’s	Bartender	Short
2025	Through The Grapevine	Wesley	Short
2026	Insatiable	Henry	Short
2026	King Kong Company-Corfu	The Trio Leader	Music Video

== Television series ==
Year	Title	Character	Episodes
2004	Fair City	Roy Kingston	1 episode
2007-2008	Killinaskully	Magic Contestant/Re-enactor No.2	2 episodes
2010	Mattie	Chicken 1	1 episode
2011	Corp & Anam	J.D	2 episodes
2023	Hidden Assets	Ger Townsend	1 episode

== Director/Playwright ==
Year	Title	Role	Type	Company
2004	In Rear View	Director/Playwright	Theatre Production	Limerick Youth Theatre
2006	Jack and the Beanstalk	Director	Theatre Production	An Grianán Theatre
2009	Language Unbecoming A Lady	Director/Playwright	Theatre Production	Bottom Dog Theatre
2009	Off The Wall	Director/Playwright	Theatre Production	Bottom Dog Theatre & Belltable Arts Centre
2009	The Revenger's Tragedy	Director	Theatre Production	Bottom Dog Theatre
2010	Elegies for Angels, Punks and Raging Queens	Director	Theatre Production	Bottom Dog Theatre
2010	Dorian	Director/Playwright	Theatre Production	Limerick Youth Theatre
2010	Porkville	Director/Playwright	Theatre Production	Bottom Dog Theatre
2011	The Lola Montez Experience	Writer	Music Production	Music Generation Limerick
2011	Killer Kabaret	Director	Theatre Production	Indie Theatre Production
2011	The Creative Show: Channel Surfing	Director/Playwright	Musical Theatre	Limerick Youth Theatre
2012	A Christmas Carol	Director	Theatre Production	Bottom Dog Theatre
2012	The Creative Show: Storyland	Director/Playwright	Musical Theatre	Limerick Youth Theatre
2013	The Creative Show: Take Away Time	Director/Playwright	Musical Theatre	Limerick Youth Theatre
2014	The Creative Show: A Night at the Library	Director/Playwright	Musical Theatre	Limerick Youth Theatre
2014	The Bachelor of Kilkish	Director/Playwright	Theatre Production	Bottom Dog Theatre
2014	Seven Deadly Sins	Director	Theatre Production	Indie Theatre Production
2015	The Creative Show: Around The World in 80 Minutes	Director/Playwright	Musical Theatre	Limerick Youth Theatre
2016	The Creative Show: Gulliver’s Travels 2016	Director/Playwright	Musical Theatre	Limerick Youth Theatre
2017	The Creative Show: #Gogglebox	Director/Playwright	Musical Theatre	Limerick Youth Theatre
2018	The Creative Show: Return to Storyland	Director/Playwright	Musical Theatre	Limerick Youth Theatre
2020	The Creative Show: Shamstory	Director/Playwright	Musical Theatre	Limerick Youth Theatre
2021	A Wilde Fan	Director/Playwright	Theatre Production	Bottom Dog Theatre
2021	Shannon Banks	Director	Video	I Love Limerick
2022	The 5 Flannery’s	Director	Short Film	Limerick Youth Theatre & Redpaw Media
2023	The Creative Show: Shamstory: Da Real Story of Limerick	Director/Playwright	Musical Theatre	Limerick Youth Theatre
2024	The Creative Show: A Night at the Cinema	Director/Playwright	Musical Theatre	Limerick Youth Theatre
2025	The Creative Show: A Night on the Town	Director/Playwright	Musical Theatre	Limerick Youth Theatre
2026	The Creative Show: A Night at the Theatre	Director/Playwright	Musical Theatre	Limerick Youth Theatre

== Theatre performances ==
Year	Title	Role	Production	Company
1988	Sive	Actor	Theatre	Island Theatre
1989	The Colleen Bawn	Danny Mann	Theatre	Island Theatre
1995	Pinocchio	Pinocchio	Theatre	Everyman Theatre, Cork
1997	Hamlet	Claudius	Theatre	Island Theatre
1998	Translations	Manus	Theatre	Island Theatre
1999	Pig Town	(Various Roles)	Theatre	Island Theatre
2001	The Taming of the Shrew	Actor	Theatre	Island Theatre
2004	Biloxi Blues	Eugene	Theatre	Island Theatre
2006	Under Milk Wood	(Various Roles)	Theatre	Cork Opera House
2008	The Merchant of Venice	Shylock & Antonio	Theatre	Steeple
2009	Language Unbecoming A Lady	Bobby	Theatre	Bottom Dog Theatre
2011	Love, Peace and Robbery	Heskie	Theatre	Magic Roundabout & Belltable
2012	Cinderella	Ugly Sister	Panto	University Concert Hall
2013	A Chip in the Sugar	Graham Rodwell	Theatre	Bottom Dog Theatre
2013	What Happened to Bridgie Clearly	Mikey	Theatre	Bottom Dog Theatre
2014	Jack and the Beanstalk	Dame Lola	Panto	University Concert Hall
2014	Juno & the Paycock	Joxer Daly	Theatre	Bottom Dog Theatre
2014	Twelfth Night	Andrew Aguecheek	Theatre	Natural Shocks
2015	The Playboy of the Western World	Philly Cullen	Theatre	Yew Tree Theatre
2015	Sleeping Beauty	Dame	Panto	University Concert Hall
2016	Beauty and the Beast	Dame	Panto	University Concert Hall
2017	Cinderella	Ugly Sister	Panto	University Concert Hall
2018	Snow White and the tale of the Lost Boys	Dame	Panto	University Concert Hall
2019	Aladdin	Widow Twankey	Panto	University Concert Hall
2020-2021	Jack and the Beanstalk	The Dame	Panto	University Concert Hall-Online Production
2021	Waiting For Poirot	Suit	Theatre	Honest Arts, Lime Tree Theatre & Belltable
2022-2023	Peter Pan	The Dame	Panto	University Concert Hall
2023-2024	Cinderella	Kim	Panto	University Concert Hall
2024-2025	Mother Goose	Mother Goose	Panto	University Concert Hall

== Awards and nominations ==
Year	Award	Production	Status
2014	Limerick Person of the Month		Won
2014	Limerick Person of the Year		Nominated
2015	Origin 1st Irish Theatre Festival	Language: Unbecoming a Lady	Won
2015	Civic Honour- Cultural Ambassador for Limerick		Won
2015	Origin 1st Irish Theatre Festival	Language: Unbecoming a Lady	Nominated
