= James Spaight =

James Spaight may refer to:

- James Spaight (sport shooter), British sport shooter
- Sir James Spaight (MP), Irish politician
