= Alison Turnbull =

Colombian-born British painter and sculptor (born 1956)

Alison Turnbull (born 16 March 1956, Bogotá) is a Colombian-born British artist who works in painting and drawing.

Early in her career, Turnbull worked as an invigilator at the Serpentine Gallery.

== Exhibitions ==
=== Solo exhibitions ===
- 2001 "Houses into Flats," Museum of Modern Art, Oxford
- 2003 "Hospital," Matt's Gallery, London
- 2010 Matt's Gallery, London
- 2012 Talbot Rice Gallery, Edinburgh
- 2013 De La Warr Pavilion, East Sussex
- 2014 Shandy Hall, North Yorkshire
- 2015 Royal Botanic Garden Edinburgh
- 2016 Art Seen, Nicosia

=== Group exhibitions ===
- 2010 Parallel Remix, Leonard Hutton Galleries, New York
- 2010 On the Edge of the World, Royal Botanic Garden, Edinburgh
- 2011 The Russian Club Gallery, London
- 2012 The Bluecoat, Liverpool
- 2012 The Fruitmarket Gallery, Edinburgh
- 2013 "Galápagos," Centro de Arte Moderna (CAM), Lisbon
- 2013 "Universal Fragments: Conversations with Trevor Shearer," Large Glass, London (2013)
- 2014 "Summer Exhibition," Royal Academy of Art, London
- 2014 "Colour on Paper," Galeria Leme, São Paulo
- 2015 "Multiplicities," Art Seen, Nicosia
- 2016 "Seeing Round Corners: the Art of the Circle," Turner Contemporary, Margate
- 2016 "Blackrock," Lydney Park Estate, Gloucestershire
- 2016 "Compression," Ormston House Gallery, Limerick
