= 1927 (theatre company) =

British theatre and animation company

1927 is a British theatre and animation company, based in Margate, Kent, England. It produces and performs mixed-media live animation theatre.

== History ==
1927 was established in 2005 by animator and illustrator Paul Barritt and writer and performer Suzanne Andrade, together with performer Esme Appleton; Lillian Henley and Jo Crowley were also involved as composer and pianist, and as producer respectively. Its productions combine performance, live music, animation, and film.

1927's first production was Between the Devil and the Deep Blue Sea at the Battersea Arts Centre in London and the Edinburgh Fringe in 2007. At the Edinburgh Fringe it won a Scotsman Fringe First Award, the Herald Angel Award, the Total Theatre Award for Best Emerging Company, and the Carol Tambor Best of Edinburgh Award.

They contributed theatre segments to Interview with the Vampire's second season.

== Productions ==
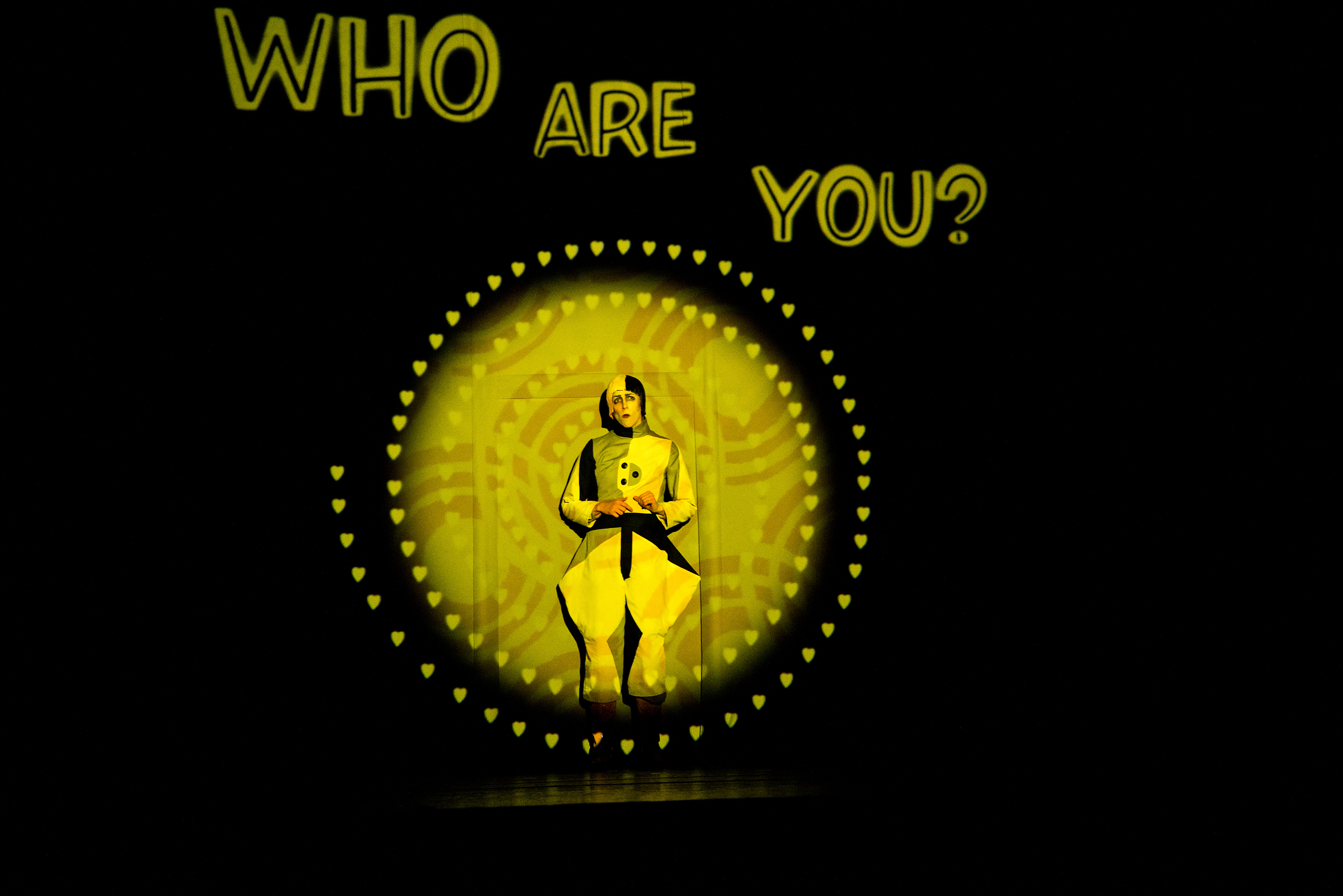
Golem at the Salzburg Festival, 2014

- Between the Devil and the Deep Blue Sea (2007).
- The Animals & Children Took to the Streets (2010), first performed at the Sydney Opera House.
- The Magic Flute (2012), first performed at the Komische Oper, Berlin. The Magic Flute was a re-imagining of Mozart's comedy, written in collaboration with Barrie Kosky, Artistic Director of the Komische Oper Berlin.
- Golem (2014), first performed at the Harrogate Theatre.
- Petrushka & L'enfant et les sortilèges (2017) first performed at the Komische Oper, Berlin. Petrushka & L'enfant et les sortilèges is a large-scale double bill of Stravinsky’s ballet Petruskha and Ravel's opera L'enfant et les sortilèges.
- Roots (2019) first performed at the Spoleto Festival USA, Charleston, South Carolina.
- Tales of Hoffmann (2023) first performed at the Graz Opera, Austria. It is a new staging of Jacques Offenbach's opéra fantastique The Tales of Hoffmann.
- Mehr Als Alles Auf Der Welt / Please Right Back (2023) first performed in German at the Burgtheater Vienna, Austria and to be first performed in English at the Gulbenkian Theatre, University of Kent, Canterbury.

== Audio ==
- Decameron Nights, an audio performance based on the stage show Roots, broadcast on BBC Radio 3 (2020). The name Decameron Nights refers to Giovanni Boccaccio's The Decameron, written in response to the Black Death of 1348.
