= Rutland Street, Limerick =

Street in central Limerick, Ireland

Rutland Street
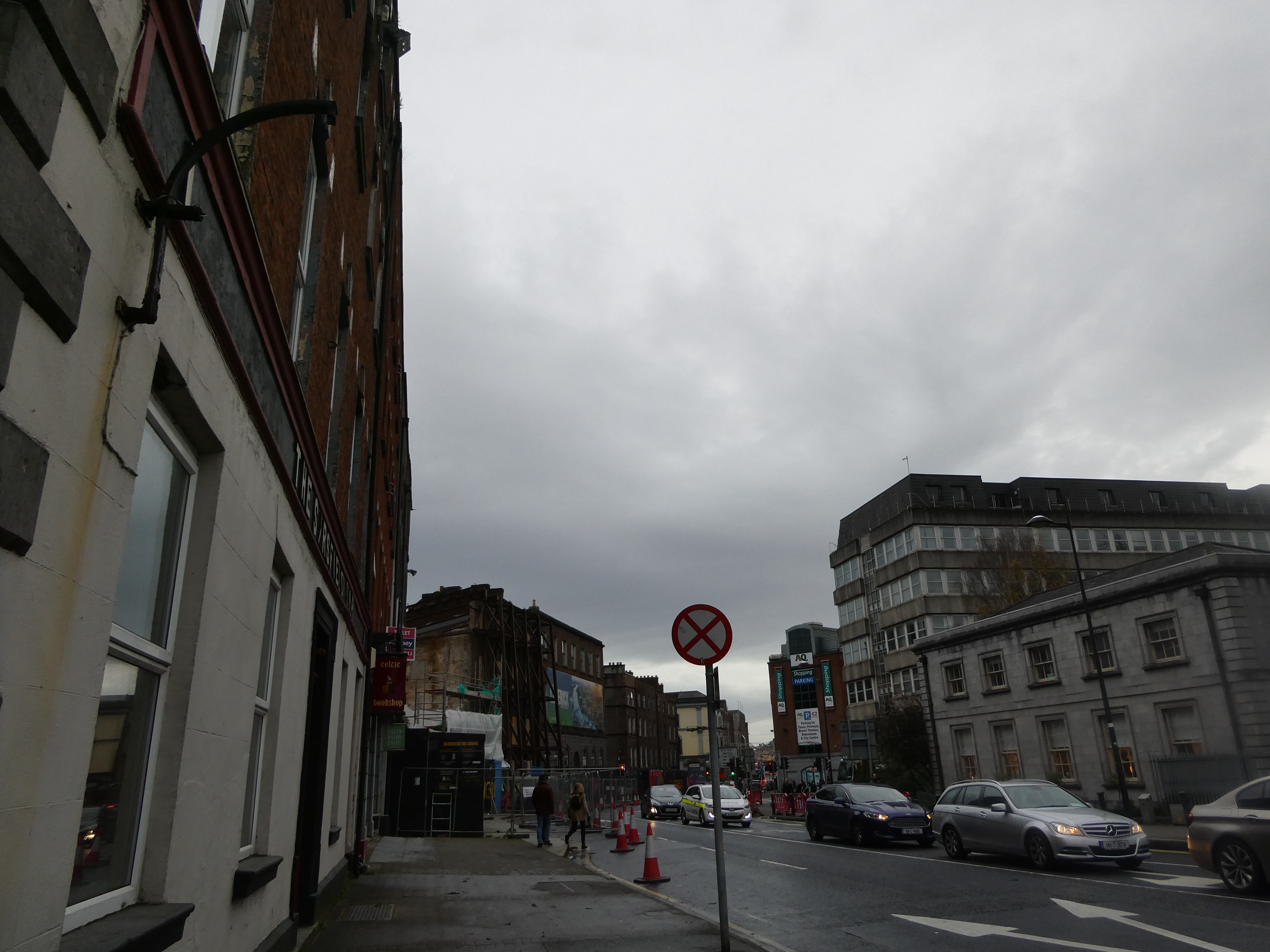
- Streetscape
- Interactive map of Rutland Street
- Native name: Sráid Rutland (Irish)
- Namesake: Charles Manners, 4th Duke of Rutland
- Length: 85 m (279 ft)
- Location: Limerick, Ireland
- Postal code: V94
- Coordinates: 52°39′58″N 8°37′26″W
- north end: Bridge Street, Mathew Bridge
- south end: Patrick Street, Francis Street

Other
- Known for: Hunt Museum, Fab Lab Limerick, former town hall

Rutland Street (Irish: Sráid Rutland) is a street in central Limerick, Ireland that forms part of the main central thoroughfare of the city which incorporates Rutland Street, Patrick Street and O'Connell Street. Named after the 4th Duke of Rutland, Charles Manners, who was appointed Lord Lieutenant of Ireland in 1784 and visited Limerick in 1785. Rutland Street along with nearby Bank Place features some of Limerick's earliest (and oldest) examples of Georgian Architecture. It was the first street developed as part of Edmund Sexton Pery's plans for Newtown Pery, and was the first part of the great Georgian expansion of Limerick south from the medieval city. In 1901, Irish nationalists suggested renaming the street to Hugh O'Neill Street.

The Hunt Museum is located on Rutland Street. It is located in the former Customs House, designed by architect Davis Ducart. The building dates from 1769.

The headquarters of Limerick Corporation were located in the old Town Hall on the street. Limerick Corporation moved to Limerick's City Hall at Merchant's Quay near the City Courthouse in 1990. The old Town Hall then became the Mid West Business Institute, before it moved to Upper William Street.

As of 2024, the Opera Centre development was under construction in the city centre, which incorporates Rutland Street and the adjoining Michael Street, Ellen Street and Patrick Street.

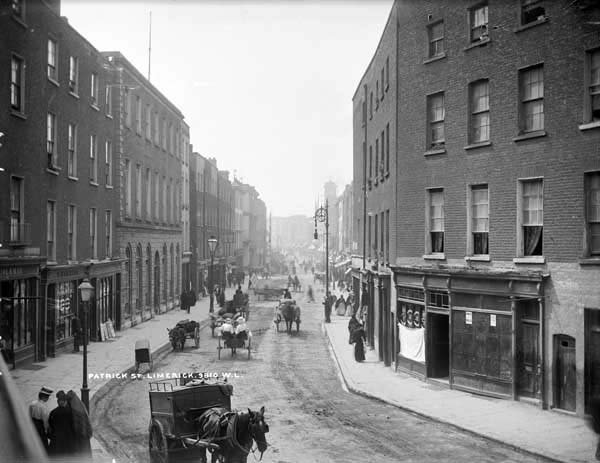
View of Rutland Street (mislabelled Patrick Street), c. 1880–1914
