= Little Gem =

Little Gem is a play written by Dublin playwright Elaine Murphy and was first produced by Guna Nua at Dublin’s 2008 Fringe Festival, September 9–13 in Project Cube, before transferring to The Loose End Studio at the Civic Theatre, Tallaght. It has been in continuous production since its debut. A three-hander tragic-comedy, Little Gem consists of three female monologists telling in successive scenes their personal histories of love and loss in an alienating contemporary world.

== Plot synopsis ==
Three generations of Dublin women, Kay (grandmother), Loraine (mother) and Amber (granddaughter) narrate several months of emotional turmoil that they have experienced. Each woman is experiencing some sort of emotional crisis and communication between the three is fraught at best. Amber, who abuses alcohol and cocaine, has recently started dating the wayward Paul and it is suggested he will not be loyal. Lorraine has been separated from her partner Ray for many years. Ray is a homeless drug addict that occasionally drops into her life wreaking havoc as he does so. As the play opens Lorraine has experienced something of an emotional break-down in work and has been encouraged by her employers to seek therapy. Kay’s husband, Gem, has suffered a recent stroke and so is emotionally and physically distant from her, requiring homecare and is unable to feed or dress himself.

In each of the women’s experience an absent male partner contributes to the disconnection that they feel. But as a token of hope and redemption the baby boy Amber gives birth to and names Gem brings the women together as they close the play by sharing a bed with the child each contributing to the care of the child.

== Original cast ==
- Anita Reeves as Kay
- Hilda Fay as Loraine
- Aoife Duffin as Amber

== Translations ==
It was translated to Galician by Avelino González and Olga F. Nogueira, as Meu ben, for Em2.

== Controversy in Slovakia ==
Little Gem has a part of repertoire of the National Theatre Košice in Slovakia since 2016. While performing the play at a festival in the Malá Franková village in 2024, the state secretary of environment Štefan Kuffa, who was present in the audience, interrupted the play by loudly demanding that children are not allowed to continue watching the "perverted" play. His behavior was met with loud condemnation of the theatre members and other spectators. The theatre itself describes the production as suitable for ages 18 and up. The festival organizer admits his mistake, including that he had not seen the performance before and that, in his opinion, the Secretary of State had the right to intervene. The organiser says in an interview that the situation was escalated by someone who called the Secretary of State a fascist and later by the media, which reported the whole thing in a one-sided and highly emotive manner.
