= Limerick lace =

Type of embroidered net lace

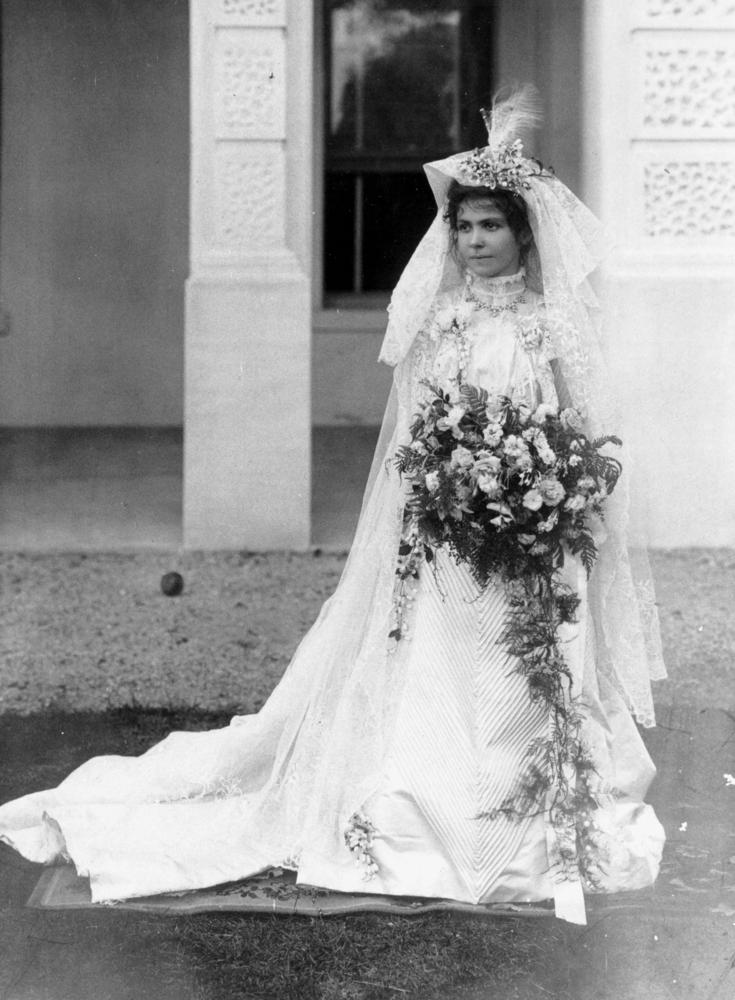
Mary Thomas Ipswich on her wedding day, April 1901, Ipswich wearing a Limerick lace veil

Limerick lace is a specific class of lace originating in Limerick, Ireland, which was later produced throughout the country. It evolved from the invention of a machine which made net in 1808. Until John Heathcoat invented a net-making machine in Devon in 1815, handmade net was a very expensive fabric. This meant cheap net became available to Irish lacemakers, particularly after 1823 when Heathcoat's patent expired.

Limerick lace is a hybrid lace of embroidered needle lace or crocheted lace on a machine made net base. It is a 'mixed lace' rather than a ‘true lace’, which would be entirely hand made. Limerick lace comes in two forms: tambour lace, which is made by stretching a net over a frame like a tambourine and drawing threads through it with a hook, and needlerun lace, which is made by using a needle to embroider on a net background.

The lace was noted for its variety of delicate fillings, as many as 47 different ones being found in one collar.

== History ==
The Limerick lace industry was founded in 1829 by Charles Walker, a native of Oxfordshire.

The history of Limerick lace can be divided into two broad periods: the age of factory production 1829-c.1870 and the age of home and workshop production c.1870-1914.

In 1829, Walker brought over 24 girls to teach lace-making in Limerick, drawn to the area by the availability of cheap, skilled female labour, and his business thrived. Charles Walker chose Limerick after touring various sites for the business. Limerick previously had a thriving Limerick glove industry, but at this time had a large population of unemployed women with a tradition of factory work. Limerick lace was produced mainly in factories for the first forty years of its existence. Between the 1830s and 1860s, several lace factories operated in Limerick. The city’s second lace factory was established in 1835 by William Lloyd, initially at Clare Street and later in Abbey Court off Nicholas Street. In 1841, there were 400 women and girls working for him. In 1836, Leycester Greaves (1809-47), a Cork man opened a factory in Limerick. These lace factories employed almost 2,000 women and girls.

In the 1840s, Limerick lace making was introduced to a number of convents and convent-run institutions, both in Limerick and elsewhere. In 1850, lace making was introduced to the Good Shepherd Convent on Clare Street Limerick, but it was also made in other religious houses based in the city, including the Presentation Convent in Sexton Street and the Mercy Convent at Mount Saint Vincent, on O’Connell Avenue. Limerick lace was disseminated widely throughout Ireland by Catholic religious sisters, anxious to provide employment at the time of the Famine. They introduced it to several other convents, including religious houses in Youghal, Kinsale, Dunmore East, Cahirciveen, and Kenmare. At the Good Shepherd Convent, the last lace making centre in Limerick, production ceased in 1990.

In the 1860s and 1870s, the Limerick lace industry declined rapidly, due to the market being flooded by entirely machine made lace from chiefly from Nottingham. One reason for this period of decline was the realisation that design was necessary for beautiful lace. Following the Cork Industrial Exhibition of 1883, the President of Queen's College, Cork, wrote, "... only well-designed and finely executed lace [that] can hold its ground against machine lace."

It was revived in the 1880s due to the work of Florence Vere O'Brien (1858-1936) who established a Lace School in Limerick, which opened with eight pupils in May 1889. This ran until 1922. Another important promoter of Limerick lace during this period was Ishbel Hamilton-Gordon, Countess of Aberdeen (1847-1939) who established the Irish Industries Association in 1886 to encourage the 'Buy Irish' movement. This was integral to reviving Limerick lace as a traditional craft.

In 1904, Mrs Maude Kearney (1873-1963), a daughter of James Hodkinson, founder of the famous firm of specialists in church decoration in Henry Street, Limerick, established a lace making business which she called the Thomond Lace Industry. Based in Thomondgate, Thomond Lace employed between fifty and eighty workers at the height of its success. After the Second World War, Limerick lace declined rapidly.

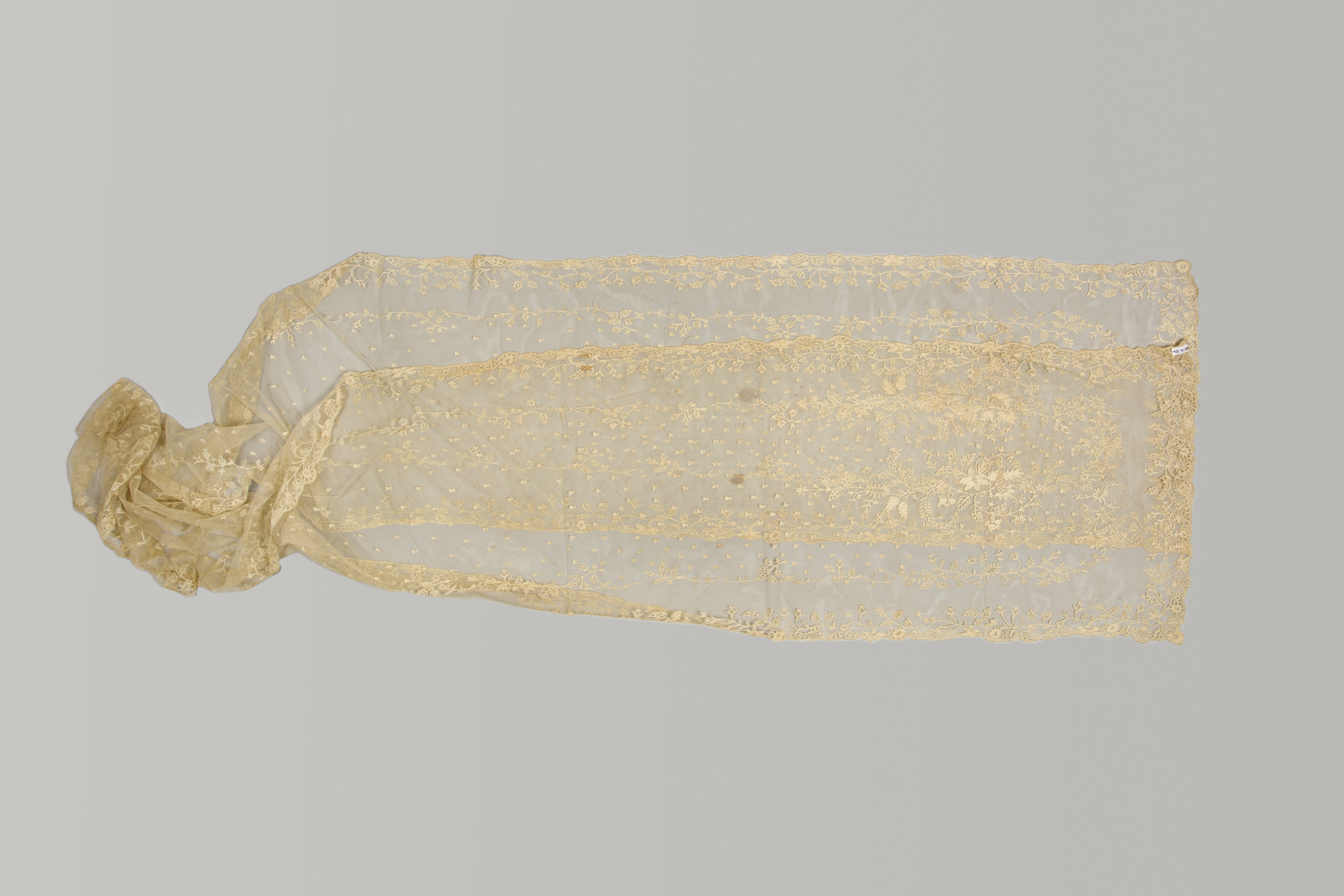
Limerick Lace Fichu Given to Charles Lindbergh

Those who are known to have worn Limerick lace were Queen Victoria, Edith Roosevelt and Countess Markievicz. When John F. Kennedy visited Limerick in 1963 he was presented with a lace christening robe. This christening robe was created in the Good Shepherd Convent, Clare Street, Limerick. Generations of churchmen also wore Limerick lace and used lace to decorate their churches.

Limerick Museum holds the largest collection of Limerick lace in the country. A collection is also held in the Sisters of Mercy in Charleville, Co. Cork.

The Missouri Historical Society holds a gift of Limerick Lace given to Charles Lindbergh.

== Features ==
Limerick lace is formed on a mesh using one or both of two techniques:

- Tambour – where chain stitch is created using a hook.
- Needlerun – where stitches are darned onto the ground using a needle.

Sometimes applique was used, including net appliqued onto net, which made a gossamer fabric. The types of lace made in the first factory at this time were fichus, blond lace trimming and grey lace (spotted), traced by tambour workers and filled by runners. Later in the 1840s the types of lace in production were floss work, satin stitch, Valencienne, two-stitch and moss work, however the introduction of machine-made lace was impacting the quality of the running work.

== Modern revival ==
Limerick lace is still produced on a very small commercial basis by individual lace makers such as Eileen Browne. A number of classes are held both within Limerick and throughout the country in an attempt to revive the practice.

In 2014, Limerick City Council published a comprehensive history on Limerick lace called Amazing Lace, written by Dr Matthew Potter, Curator of Limerick Museum.

In 2019, Limerick lace was added to the Irish National Inventory of Intangible Cultural Heritage.

In 2019, Veronica Rowe, the granddaughter of Florence Vere O'Brien, handed over her lace collection on longterm loan to the Limerick Museum.

In 2023, Grania McElligott donated the Maude Kearney lace collection to the Limerick Museum, adding to the existing Limerick lace collection.

Since 2017, a series of exhibitions and conferences, both virtual and actual dedicated to Limerick lace have been held by Limerick Museum. In the same year, a group of lacemakers and lace enthusiasts came together under the name "Friends of Lace Limerick" to work with Limerick Museum on the preservation and cataloguing of lace artefacts in the museum collection and on the revival of Limerick lace traditions. Friends of Lace Limerick organised the Amazing Lace Symposium in collaboration with Limerick Museum in 2018, 2019 and again in 2024.

For August 2025, Limerick Museum is planning a lace exhibition that will include the highlights of all its collections.
