= William Street, Limerick =

Street in Limerick, Ireland

William Street
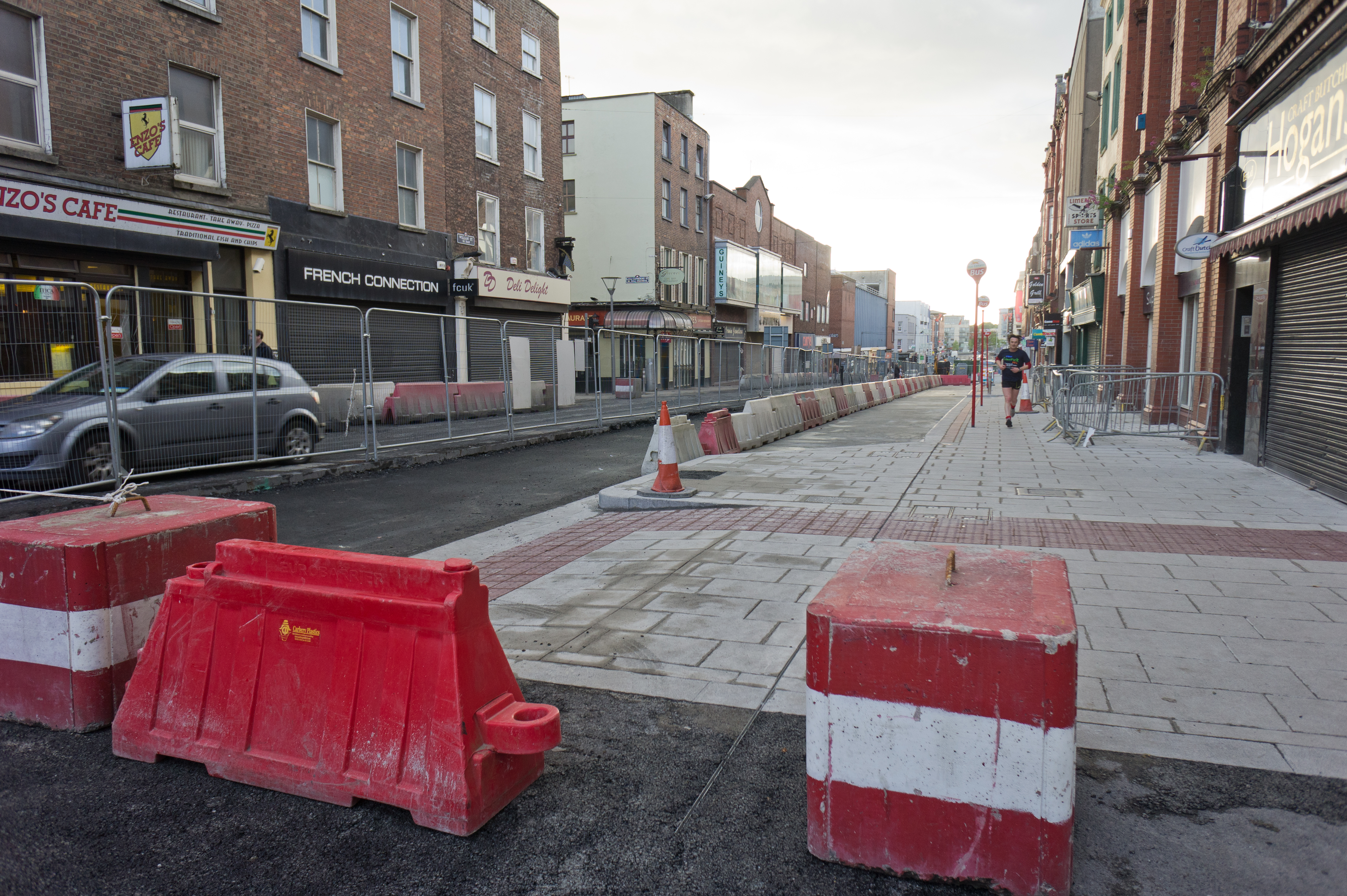
- William Street in 2011
- Interactive map of William Street
- Native name: Sráid Liam (Irish)
- Namesake: William Pery, 1st Baron Glentworth
- Length: 500 m (1,600 ft)
- Width: 18 metres (59 ft)
- Location: Limerick, Ireland
- Postal code: V94
- Coordinates: 52.662625°N 8.623554°W
- northwest end: O'Connell Street, Sarsfield Street
- southeast end: Mulgrave Street, Old Windmill Road, Roxboro Road

Other
- Known for: shops, pubs, restaurants, financial institutions

William Street (Irish: Sráid Liam) is one of the main thoroughfares of central Limerick City, Ireland. The street starts at a junction with O'Connell Street (Limerick's main thoroughfare) and continues in a south-east direction, where it is called Upper William Street. The street is named after William Pery, 1st Baron Glentworth, the brother of Edmund Sexton Pery, who is credited with the development of the present day Limerick City Centre area known as Newtown Pery.

== Architectural makeup ==
The street is architecturally Georgian in style like much of the Limerick City Centre area. There was a major fire on William Street in May 1860. Prior to the construction of the Limerick Southern Ring Road the street formed part of the N24 route between Limerick & Waterford. It is now part of the R527 road.
