= Elaine Murphy (playwright) =

Irish playwright

- Occupation: Playwright
- Writing career
- Notable awards: Carol Tambor Best of Edinburgh Award (2009)

Elaine Murphy is an Irish playwright. Her play Little Gem, about three Irish women, won the Fishamble New Writing Award in 2008 and the Carol Tambor Best of Edinburgh Award in 2009. In 2008 Murphy won the Stewart Parker BBC Northern Ireland Drama Award. Her second play Shush premiered in June 2013 at the Abbey Theatre.
