= Ormston House =

Art gallery in Limerick, Ireland

Ormston House, Cultural Resource Centre

- Location within Ireland
- Established: 2011
- Location: 9-10 Patrick Street, Limerick, Ireland
- Coordinates: 52.665°N 8.6251°W
- Type: Art Gallery
- Founder: Mary Conlon
- Website: ormstonhouse.com

Ormston House is a contemporary art gallery and cultural resource centre, in Limerick, Ireland.

== Background ==
It was opened in 2011 at 9-10 Patrick Street, Limerick. It was founded after art students occupied the ground floor of the 19th-century building on Patrick Street, and turned it into a gallery and cultural resource space with the support of the Creative Limerick scheme. They have worked with over 300 artists from over 25 countries to deliver over 360 events.

The name Ormston House comes from the first self-service supermarket opened in Limerick city. It was opened by Jack Ormston in 1961 in a Venetian-palazzi style building on the corner of Patrick Street and Ellen Street. The building was later purchased by NAMA and, in 2018, the centre was under threat of closure after New York firm Cerberus Capital Management purchased the Ormston House loan book from the NAMA, and the site was put on the open market in July 2017. In response, over three thousand people signed an online petition to prevent the sale of the building on the open market. In 2021, the ground floor and basement of 9-10 Patrick Street were officially purchased by Limerick Council. Following the purchase, Ormston House was granted a 30 year lease from Limerick Council.

Ormston House is a member of three international networks: Artists' Initiatives Meetings, River Cities Platform, and Trans Europe Halles. In 2018, the group collaborated with EVA International with featured artists and projects include Kevin Gaffney, The Museum of Mythological Water Beasts, Stanzas, THEATREclub, and World Recipe Exchange.

In 2021, their "Women of Limerick" mobile phone app, which placed women of historical importance on a map of Limerick, won the National Heritage Week award for Limerick.

In 2023 Pádraic E. Moore was appointed as Artistic Director.

== Notable events and artists ==
Their Artist-in-Residence programme have included creatives such as theatre practitioner Ann Blake, artist Ciara Barker, artist Mary Conroy, artist Ceara Conway, artist Isolde Donohoe, musician Mícheál Keating, writer William Keohane, artist Niamh Porter, theatre practitioner Joanne Ryan, and historian Sharon Slater.

Ormston House sponsored the Limerick Lady Podcast (2020-2025) hosted by Emma Langford and Ann Blake.

=== Artists and exhibitions ===
- Tania Candiani - River Residence (2021-2023)
- Richard Malone (designer) - Figures (2022)
- Ceara Conway - SINOU (2019)
- Alison Turnbull - Compression (2016)
- Mark Dion - Against the Current (2015)
- Richard Mosse - The Enclave (2014)
- Kodwo Eshun (The Otolith Group) (2014-2016)
- Isabel Nolan - Dogs (2012)
