= Matthew Potter =

Irish academic

Doctor Matthew Potter
- Born: Donegal, Ulster, Ireland
- Education: University of London (BA); NUI Galway (PhD); Ulster University (MA)
- Occupations: Curator; academic; historian
- Years active: 2003–present
- Notable work: The Curious Story of the Limerick
- Title: Curator of the Limerick Museum
- Term: February 2017–present
- Predecessor: Brian Hodkinson
- Spouse: Colette Potter
- Children: 2

Matthew Potter FRHistS is an Irish academic who serves as the current curator of Limerick Museum. He is a published historian with a primary focus on governmental history and is an Honorary Fellow of the Department of History of the University of Limerick.

Potter has also focused on discovering links between Limerick the place and limerick the poem. He was educated in the Abbey Vocational School, Donegal Town and the Crescent College, Limerick City. He holds a Bachelor of Arts in history from the University of London and a Doctor of Philosophy in history from the National University of Ireland, Galway. Potter also graduated with a Master of Arts in museum practice and management from the University of Ulster in 2018.

He was elected a Fellow of the Royal Historical Society in 2024.

== Selected publications ==
- Limerick's Military Tradition (1691-1922): A Brief Introduction (Limerick: Limerick City and County Council, 2018).
- Roscommon – History and Society Interdisciplinary Essays on the History of an Irish County (Joint Editor with Richie Farrell and Kieran O'Conor) (Dublin: Geography Publications, 2018).
- They Dreamed and are Dead: Limerick 1916 (Joint Author with Brian Hodkinson and William O’Neill) (Limerick: Limerick City and County Council, 2016).
- Limerick's Merchants, Traders and Shakers: Celebrating Two Centuries of Enterprise (Joint Author with Sharon Slater) (Limerick: Limerick Chamber of Commerce, 2015).
- City and Cemetery: A History of Mount Saint Lawrence, Limerick (Limerick: Limerick City and County Council, 2015).
- Amazing Lace: A History of the Limerick Lace Industry (Limerick: Limerick City and County Council, 2014).
- Skibbereen Town Council: A History (Skibbereen: Skibbereen Town Council, 2014).
- The Curious Story of the Limerick (Limerick: Limerick Writers Centre, 2013)
- Boyle, Roscommon and Tulsk 1613–2013, 400 Years of Municipal Government in County Roscommon (Roscommon: Roscommon County Council, 2013)
- A Century of Service, A History of the Association of Municipal Authorities of Ireland 1912-2012 (Nenagh: Association of Municipal Authorities of Ireland, 2012).
- The Municipal Revolution in Ireland. A Handbook of Urban Government in Ireland since 1800. (Dublin: Irish Academic Press, 2010).
- Limerick – History and Society Interdisciplinary Essays on the History of an Irish County (Joint Editor with Liam Irwin and Gearóid O Tuathaigh) (Dublin: Geography Publications, 2009).
- William Monsell of Tervoe 1812-94: Catholic Unionist, Anglo-Irishman. (Dublin: Irish Academic Press, 2009).
- First Citizens of the Treaty City. The Mayors and the Mayoralty of Limerick, (Limerick: Limerick City Council, 2007).
- The Government and the People of Limerick. The History of Limerick Corporation/City Council 1197–2006, (Limerick: Limerick City Council, 2006).
- A Catholic Unionist. The Life and Times of William Monsell, first Baron Emly of Tervoe (1812-1894). A Centenary Essay, (Limerick: Treaty Press, 1994).
