= St. Joseph's Hospital, Limerick =

St. Joseph's Hospital
- Health Service Executive
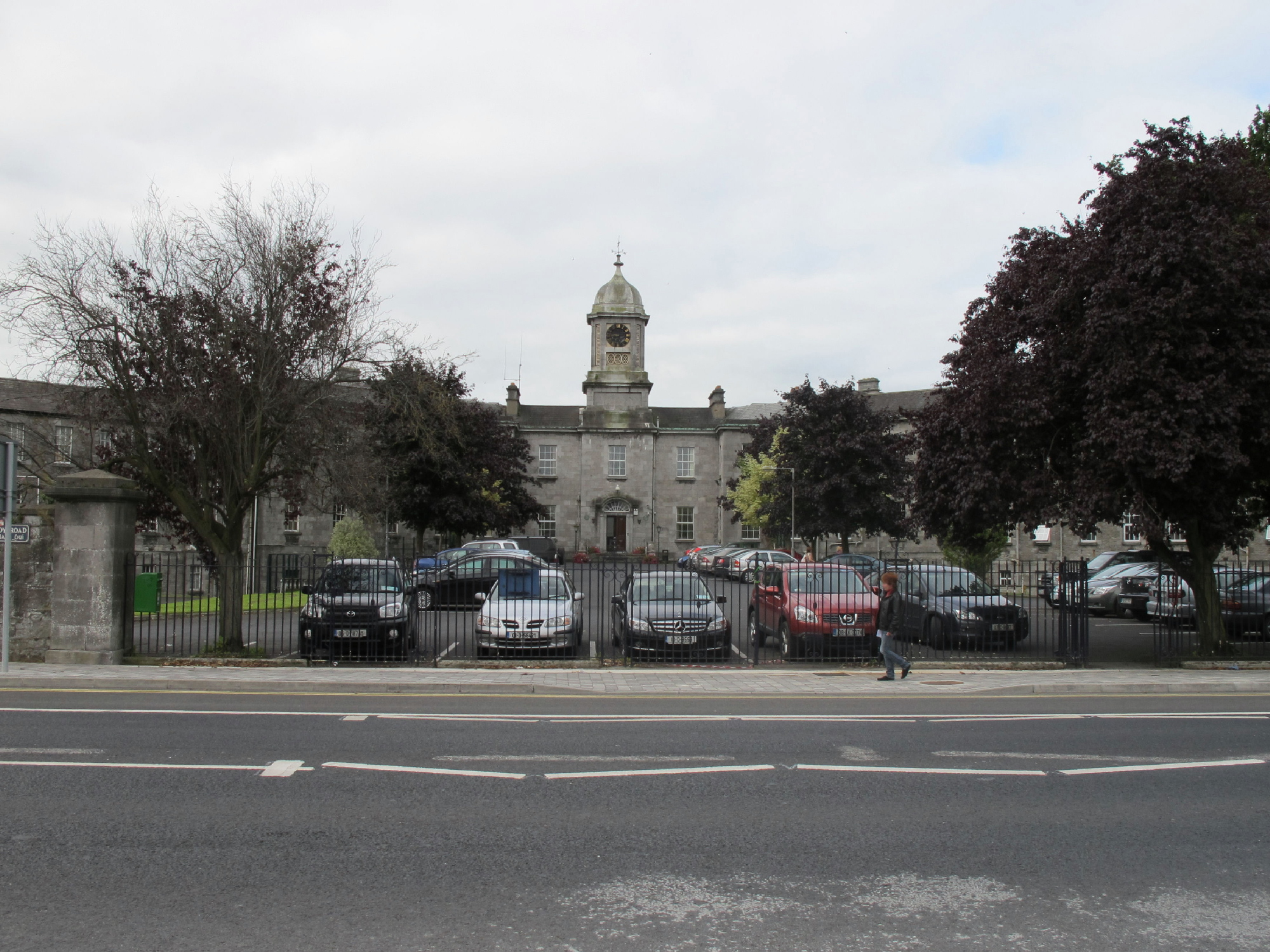
- St. Joseph's Hospital

- Shown in Ireland

Geography
- Location: Limerick, County Limerick, Ireland
- Coordinates: 52.65758°N 8.61619°W

Organisation
- Care system: HSE
- Type: Specialist

Services
- Speciality: Psychiatric hospital

History
- Founded: 1827

St. Joseph's Hospital (Irish: Ospidéal Naomh Seosamh) is a psychiatric hospital in Limerick, County Limerick, Ireland.

== History ==
The hospital, which was designed by Francis Johnston and William Murphy, opened as the Limerick Asylum in January 1827. It became Limerick Mental Hospital in the 1920s and went on to become St. Joseph's Hospital in the 1950s. After the introduction of deinstitutionalisation in the late 1980s the hospital went into a period of decline. However, despite calls for its closure, the hospital continues to offer rehabilitation services.

== Archives ==
In March 2013, the St. Joseph's Hospital Archive Collection was transferred from the Health Service Executive to Limerick City Archives on long-term loan, at a ceremony attended by the Minister for Arts, Heritage and the Gaeltacht, Jimmy Deenihan TD. The collection spans the institution's history from its foundation in 1827, and includes committal forms, minute books, inspection reports and staff records. It contains approximately 10,000 committal forms and documents the institution's successive renamings: from Limerick District Lunatic Asylum, to Limerick District Mental Hospital in 1923, and to St. Joseph's Hospital in 1959. The minute books survive from the first committee meeting in 1827 to the final meeting in 1960, when the institution was taken over by the Limerick Health Authority. As part of the project, oral history interviews were recorded with former staff members and made available through Limerick Archives.

== Campus redevelopment ==
In October 2023, HSE Mid-West Community Healthcare announced that a new Child and Adolescent Mental Health Services (CAMHS) centre and Hub Day Hospital would be developed on the St. Joseph's Hospital campus on Mulgrave Street, following a Mental Health Commission inspection of mid-west CAMHS services in June 2022.

In December 2025, Limerick City and County Council granted planning permission for a four-storey primary care centre on the front of the Mulgrave Street site. The development is planned to include a general practitioner surgery, a BreastCheck clinic, dental services, chronic disease management facilities, consulting rooms, a café, and 110 car parking spaces. The HSE has also indicated the wider campus will be redeveloped as an administrative hub for local health services, alongside the planned mental health day hospital and rehabilitation facility.
