= O'Connell Street, Limerick =

Main street of Limerick city, Ireland

O'Connell Street
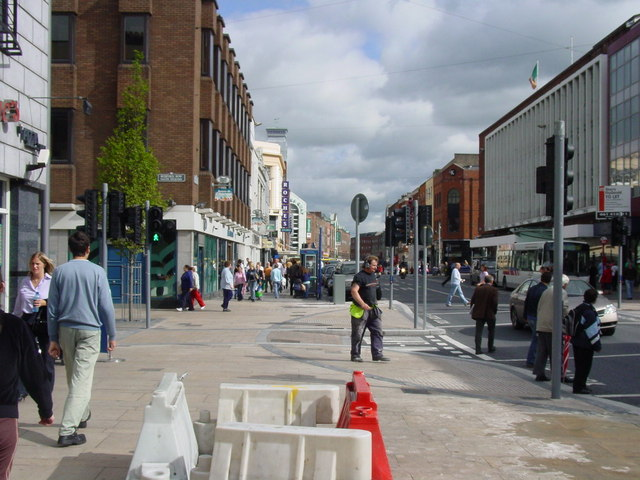
- Interactive map of O'Connell Street
- Native name: Sráid Uí Chonaill (Irish)
- Former name: George's Street
- Namesake: Daniel O'Connell
- Length: 700 m (2,300 ft)
- Width: 20 metres (66 ft)
- Location: Limerick, Ireland
- Postal code: V94
- Coordinates: 52.661916°N 8.628741°W
- northeast end: Patrick Street, Denmark Street
- southwest end: The Crescent, Hartstonge Street

Other
- Known for: shops, restaurants, Limerick Rugby Museum, St Augustine's Church, Belltable Arts Centre

O'Connell Street is also the main street in Dublin, Ennis, Sligo and in various other towns around Ireland, and also the main street of North Adelaide

O'Connell Street (Irish: Sráid Uí Chonaill) is the main thoroughfare of the city of Limerick. It was previously known as George's Street (after George III) until it was renamed after Daniel O'Connell. The street runs in parallel to the River Shannon and forms part of an overall thoroughfare, along with Rutland Street and Patrick Street, that bisects Limerick City Centre in a northeast to southwest direction. The street is about a mile in length, starting at the Arthurs Quay / Denmark Street junction and ending at The Crescent. A monument to Daniel O'Connell stands at the centre of The Crescent overlooking O'Connell Street. The street is noted for its Georgian architectural heritage.

== Retail & Services ==
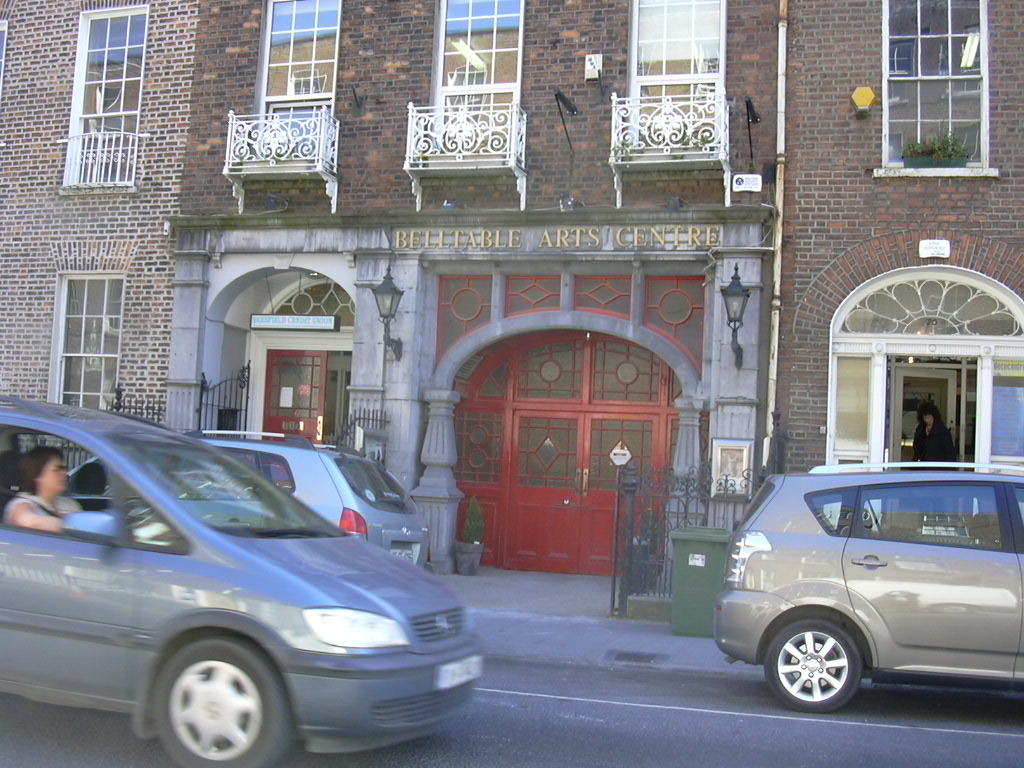
The Belltable Arts Centre, 69 O'Connell Street

Retail outlets on O'Connell Street include Brown Thomas, Debenhams and Penneys, while O'Mahony's have a large bookstore there founded in 1902. The George Hotel is also located on the street, which also acts as a regional financial services centre with a number of large retail banking operations, including Bank of Ireland, AIB, Permanent TSB, Ulster Bank and KBC Bank.

A study carried out by the CBRE Ireland Research Team in 2012 found that 16% of retail units on O'Connell Street were vacant, making it the worst performing main city thoroughfare in Ireland in retail terms. The results also reflected poorly on the quality of retail offered on O'Connell Street with Limerick having the greatest proportion of fast food restaurants on its main street, at 21%, followed by footwear at 13%, and jewellery stores at 5%; this was in stark contrast to other Irish cities and towns where women's fashion occupies the core retail slots on the main streets and also offer a more mixed fashion offering.

The Belltable Arts Centre, located at 69 O'Connell Street, is a multi-disciplinary venue which houses a 250-seat theatre/cinema, a 50-seat balcony studio (for occasional poetry and smaller performances), a visual arts gallery (hosting up to 12 exhibitions a year) and a basement restaurant. It hosts the Unfringed Festival, which is Limerick's only performance festival in spring.

== History ==
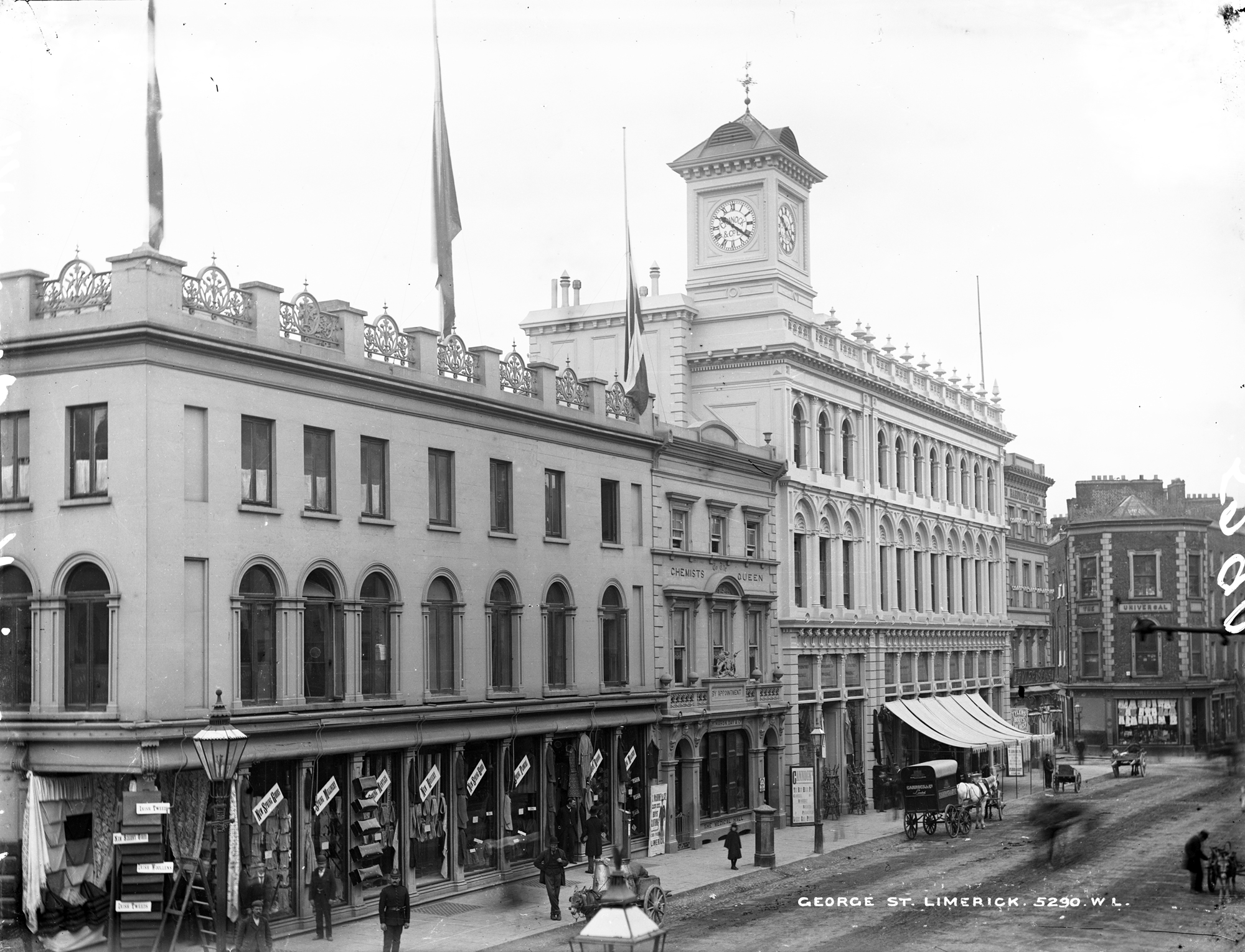
View of Cannock's Department Store (now Penney's) and its Landmark Clock Tower on O'Connell Street in the early 20th century

O'Connell Street dates from the late 18th to early 19th century as part of Edmund Sexton Pery's plan for the development of a new city on lands he owned to the south of the existing medieval city. In 1765, he commissioned the engineer Davis Ducart to design a town plan on those lands which have since become known as Newtown Pery. The centrepiece of this development was O'Connell Street. The street along with the rest of Newtown Pery was built to Georgian design and is part of Limerick's Georgian Quarter.

The street prospered from the time of its construction and quickly attracted the city's wealthier residents, who then resided in the Englishtown area of medieval Limerick. The cramped and lofty Dutch styled dwellings of Englishtown and Irishtown were no match for the new, grand and spacious housing & thoroughfares of Newtown Pery. Although the street functioned as the main retail & commercial district of the city, this was (and remains today) primarily focused on the northern end of the street. The southern end of the street, in contrast, was more residential, with the barrier being located about midway on the street (from the Cecil Street junction). Today, most of the residential town houses on the street are now occupied by offices.

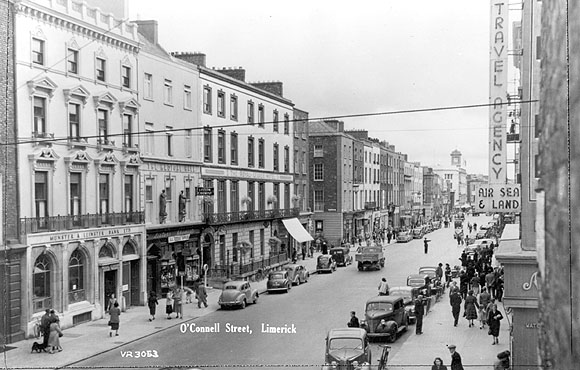
View of the old AIB bank & Royal George Hotel on O'Connell Street, in the 1950s

From the 1950s onwards due to accidental damage from fire, neglect and poor planning by the city authorities a lot of the Georgian heritage has been lost on the northern end of the street around the retail core. Notable architectural losses include the façades of Cannock's Department store and its landmark clock tower (now Penneys), Todd's Department Store (now Brown Thomas) and Cruises Hotel (now Cruises Street) amongst many more. Nevertheless, some of the finest examples Georgian townhouse architecture in Ireland still survives on the southern end and along the Crescent area of the street.

For a time the O'Connell Street and William Street/Sarsfield Street junction was historically an important crossroads junction in the west of Ireland with four national primary routes converging at the one place. The N7 from Dublin and the east, the N18 from Galway and the north, the N20 from counties Cork, Kerry and the southwest and the N24 from Waterford and the southeast all converged at the one place. Most of O'Connell Street was part of the N20 prior to the opening of the Limerick Southern Ring Road in 2004. It now forms part of the R527 regional road.

=== Irish Civil War ===
O'Connell Street was the location of the main incidents of the Irish Civil War in Limerick. The anti - treaty forces largely held four military barracks and most of the city while the Free state forces in the city held Cruises Hotel on O'Connell Street (along with Customs House, the Jail, the Courthouse, William Street RIC Barracks which were all located nearby). During this time Limerick saw much street fighting between the opposing forces which lasted three days. The fighting resulted in 15 deaths, seven of whom were civilians and eight Free State soldiers. Another 87 were wounded. (See: Irish Free State offensive)

=== Todd's Fire ===
On 25 August 1959, Limerick's best known department store was the scene of the city's largest and most destructive fire. Todd's which occupied a large city block fronting onto O'Connell Street (now occupied by Brown Thomas) and William Street went on fire following an electrical fault. At 11 a.m. smoke was noticed coming from the William Street side of the store and by 12.30 the whole block became a blazing inferno. The fire spread and destroyed the stores adjoining Todd's including at the time Burtons, Liptons, Goodwins and Cesars which were completely gutted.

=== Cruises Street development ===
In the early 1990s one of Limerick's main landmarks - Cruises Hotel was demolished to make way for a new pedestrian street 'Cruises Street' at the northern end of O'Connell Street. The street was constructed to bring high end retailers to the city centre.

=== Events ===
Crowds on O'Connell Street watching rugby on a large screen

- On 20 May 2006, O'Connell Street was closed to automobile traffic so that 50,000 could crowd the street to watch the Heineken Cup Final, Munster vs. Biarritz on a massive screen.
- On 24 May 2008, the street was closed again for automobiles so that crowds could watch the Heineken Cup Final between Munster and Toulouse on a massive screen.
- The Munster Rugby homecoming ceremony was also held on O'Connell Street on both occasions.
- In September 1998 thousands gathered in O'Connell Street for a speech given by the then president of the United States, Bill Clinton.
- In May 1964, thousands lined O'Connell Street as senator Ted Kennedy gave a speech from Cruises Hotel. The visit came just 5 months after the assassination of his brother John F. Kennedy who had also visited Limerick in 1963.
- The annual St. Patrick's Day parade takes place on O'Connell Street every year on the 17 March as well as the annual Limerick International Marching Band Competition which takes place on the weekend nearest to St. Patrick's Day.
- Penny’s Clock; The Clock Tower was erected by John O Carroll, Clarina, Limerick. A skilled crane driver and employee of William O Brien Crane Hire In the 1970’s. John’s son, Maurice, went on to found O Carroll Haulage and Crane Hire in Limerick.

== Present ==
O'Connell Street, remains the main street of the city. Extensive recent investment has altered the street aesthetically. The international Rugby Experience building designed by Niall McLaughlin has transformed the Georgian skyline. Businesses such as Copper Rooms have reimagined the traditional coal bunkers, turning them into a wine bar. Similarly the 101, a speakeasy type establishment has renovated and repurposed a Georgian building. The street is also home to a traditional pubs and restaurants such as the White House. O'Connell Street is home to numerous business. Culturally, Narrative 4, a storytelling youth project, is based at 58 O'Connell Street.

In November 2021, works commenced on the revitalisation of O'Connell Street. These entailed:

- Wider footpaths
- New street furniture and aesthetics
- Cycle lanes and a bus priority lane
- Relocation of on-street parking to adjacent streets

The project was due to be completed by September 2022, however an announcement by Limerick City and County Council and contractors pushed the end-date out to November 2022, followed by extra extensions in January, March, and late-May. Work was completed in June 2023.

== See also ==
- Henry Street
