= Belltable =

Arts centre in Limerick, Ireland

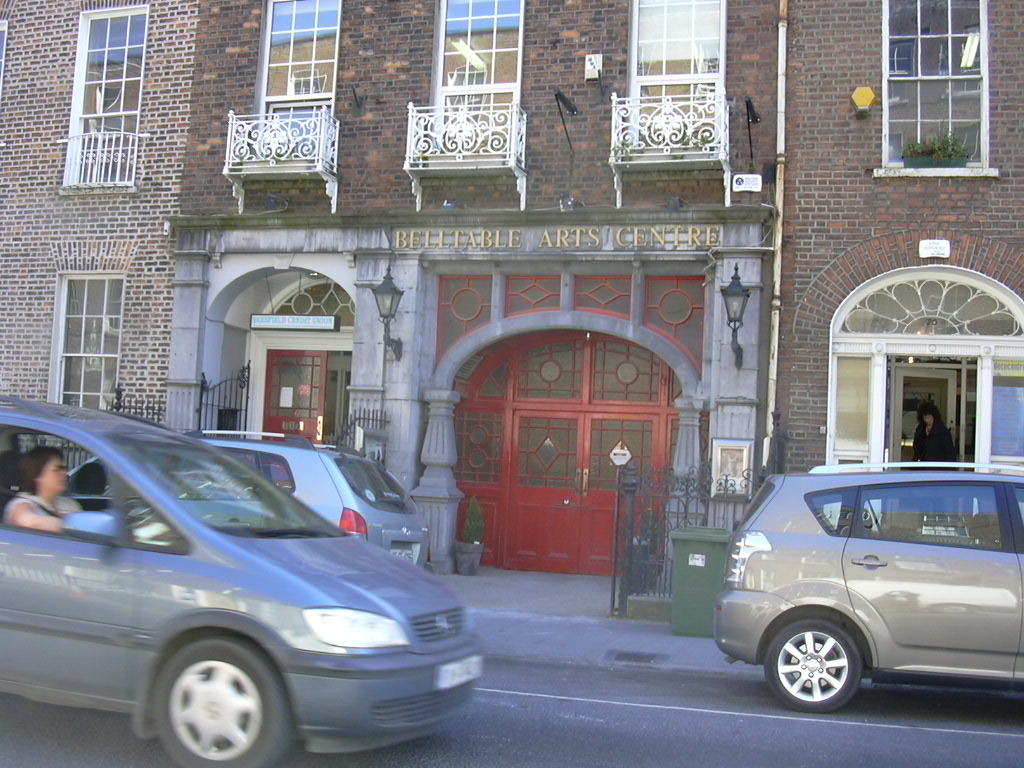
- Belletable
- Interactive map of Belltable
- Address: 69 O'Connell Street; Limerick; Ireland
- Coordinates: 52°39′35″N 8°37′51″W
- Capacity: 220
- Type: Theatre, cinema, visual arts gallery, meeting rooms, rehearsal studios
- Current use: Open Monday to Saturday 12.00 - 5.30pm

Construction
- Opened: 1981
- Architect: Michael Gough

Website
- https://www.limetreebelltable.ie/

Belltable (formerly the Belltable Arts Centre) is a multi-disciplinary arts venue located at 69 O'Connell Street, Limerick, Ireland. The facility houses a 220-seat theatre/cinema, art gallery, box office, stage, meeting rooms, rehearsal studios and offices. Through "Belltable:Connect" it aims to support the professional development of theatre artists. This includes the hire of rehearsal spaces, hotdesking facilities, office and meeting room spaces, workshops and mentorship programmes.

== History ==
The facility opened in 1981 in what was previously known as The Coliseum and the Redemptorist Confraternity Hall. It was named after Henry Hubert Belltable, a Belgian army officer who founded the Holy Confraternity in Limerick.

In February 2013 it was announced that the company behind the Belltable had gone into liquidation. The liquidation followed a major €1 million refurbishment of the centre. A budget overrun of €300,000 is believed to have been the cause of the company going into liquidation. The centre closed in January 2013.

Since 2013 it has been a regular screening venue for the Richard Harris International Film Festival.

The Belltable theatre reopened in 2016 under management of the Lime Tree Theatre due to a grant from the Arts Council.

There is a café in the basement.
