= Limerick Boat Club =

Irish rowing club

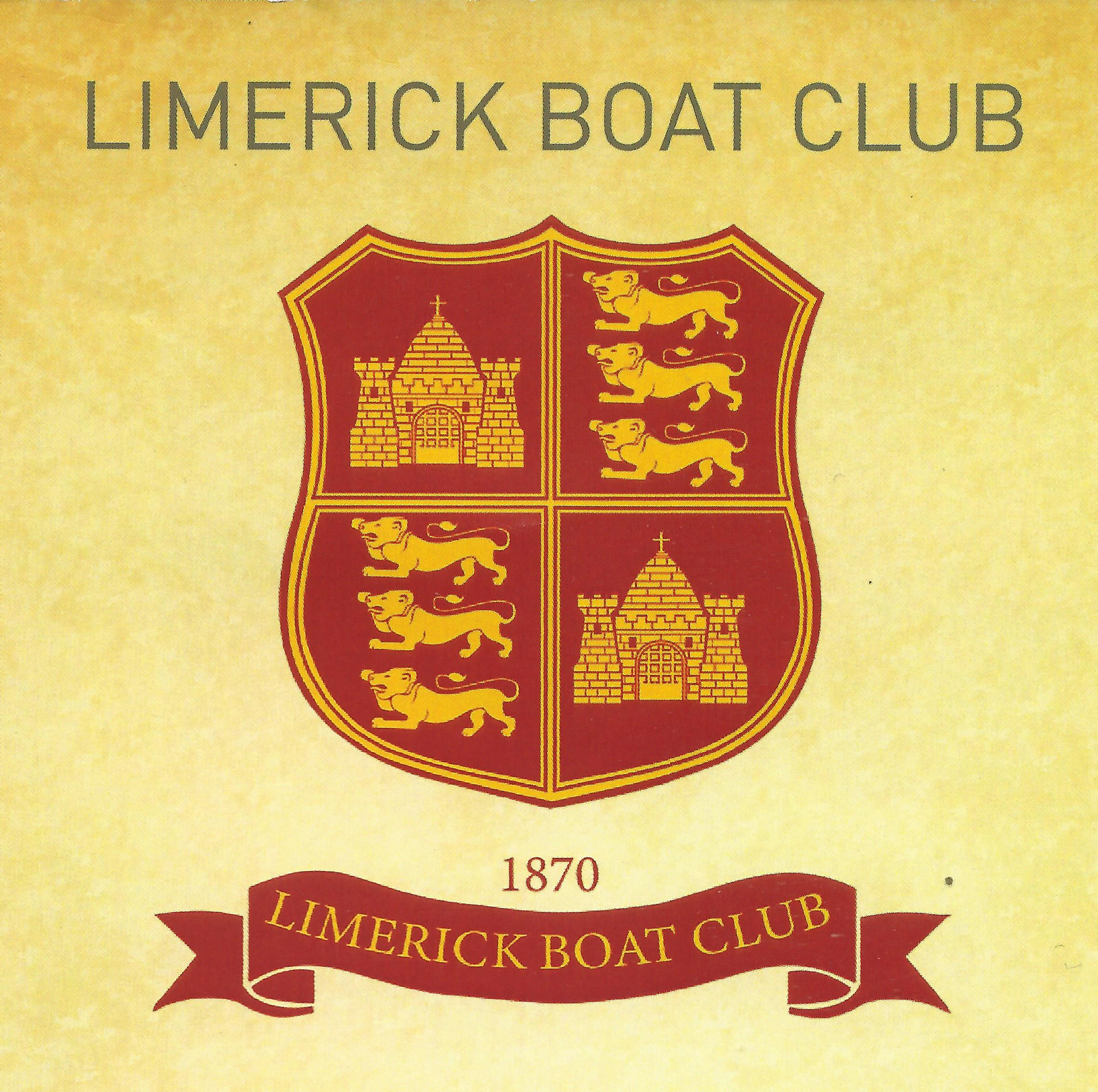
- Location: Wellesley Pier, Sarsfield Bridge, Limerick, Ireland
- Coordinates: 52.395336°N 8.374854°W
- Home water: River Shannon
- Founded: 1870; 155 years ago
- Colours: Black & White
- Affiliations: Rowing Ireland

Limerick Boat Club is a rowing club located in Limerick, Ireland. It is one of the oldest sporting clubs in Limerick and is affiliated to Rowing Ireland. The club colours are black & white

== History ==
At a meeting in the Limerick Athenaeum, on 3 February 1870, it was resolved to establish "The Limerick Boat Club". The club was swiftly established and the first annual report stated that the club had a handsome boat-house and a fleet of 10 boats. The club also established Limerick Regatta in the same year. Over the next twenty years "Boat Club" were one of the dominant crews in Irish rowing.

== National achievements ==
In 1927 the club annexed the Senior Eight Championship of Ireland at Cork regatta when they defeated neighbours Athlunkard by 1/2 length. The crew was: J.F.Ewart (bow), J.F.Stearn, W.W.Stokes, J.M.Harkness, K.T.Rea, M.W.McGuire, W.F.Treacy, T.E.O'Donnell, W.L.O'Donnell (cox).

== Notable Persons ==
Sir Alexander William Shaw, founding member and also founder of Limerick Golf Club & Lahinch Golf Club

Sir Thomas Myles, Sportsman, Surgeon & Gun runner

Sir Charles Barrington OBE, founding member of Trinity Football Club, Limerick Football Club & the IRFU

Squadron Leader David Tidmarsh, Flying Ace and founder member of Limerick Boat Club

Tommy O'Donnell served as President of the Irish Amateur Rowing Union (Rowing Ireland) from 1932–33

Burl Ives, American singer & actor

Ted Russell (Irish politician), Mayor, TD & Chairman of Limerick Harbour Commissioners

Bill Whelan, composer of Riverdance

Brendan Bowyer, Showband singer

== Recent Times ==
Activity in the club declined in the early part of the 21st century and the club eventually became dormant. On 12 February 2014 the Club achieved worldwide notoriety when the roof was peeled off the boat house in a violent storm. A clip of the disaster went viral. In 2016 the club re-affiliated to Rowing Ireland and the doors opened once again with an adult recreational rowing programme being offered. Following a successful fund-raising scheme, a new roof was installed on the boathouse in February 2020.
