= Thomas Street =

Thomas Street may refer to:

== People ==
- Thomas Street (astronomer) (1621–1689), English astronomer
- Thomas Street (judge) (1625–1696), English judge and politician
- Thomas Clark Street (1814–1872), lawyer, businessman and political figure in Ontario, Canada

== Locations ==
- Thomas Street, Dublin, Ireland
- Thomas Street, Limerick, Ireland
- Thomas Street, Perth, Australia
- Thomas Street (St. Louis), United States
- Thomas Street Middle School in Mississauga
