= Limerick Golf Club =

Golf club in Limerick, Ireland

Club information
- Location: County Limerick
- Established: 1891
- Tota holes: 18
- Tournaments: JP McManus Invitational Pro-Am, 1990, 1995, 2000
- Website: www.limerickgolfclub.ie
- Par: 72
- Length: 6500 yards
- Course record: 63, Stuart Appleby, 2000

Limerick Golf Club is located at Ballyclough, on the southern outskirts of Limerick city in Ireland. It is one of the oldest golf clubs in Ireland, founded by Alexander Shaw in the same year as the Golfing Union of Ireland, in 1891. The course and clubhouse are located on the original site of Roxboro Castle and grounds and boasts an 18-hole, mature, parkland layout. The design of the course evolved over a number of years with a major contribution in 1927 from Dr. Alister MacKenzie - who was the architect of Lahinch and Augusta National. The current layout measures 6500 yards in length and has a par of 72.

Limerick has one of the largest memberships in the country with over 1300 members, and a long tradition in competitive golf in Ireland - having won 20 national titles. The club's most recent such win was the Irish Junior Cup in 2023. It was the first Irish club to win a European title at senior level when capturing the European Club Championship in 1980. It has played host to many championships over the years - including an exhibition match in the 1930s which included eleven-time major winner Walter Hagen and John Burke. It is now home to the Munster Mid-Amateur Championship.

The J. P. McManus Pro-Am, the biggest pro-am event of its kind in Europe, had its home at Limerick Golf Club from 1990, with the last staging in July 2000. The field included some of the biggest players in the game, such as Tiger Woods and Mark O'Meara, and raised over €19,000,000 for local charities. Both of these players returned to Limerick Golf Club in 2001 and were conferred with Honorary Life Membership. Tiger Woods presented the flag from the 18th green of The 2000 Open Championship, held at St. Andrews, to the Club. This event grew too large for the Ballyclough course and moved to Adare Manor Hotel & Golf Resort in 2005.

A new clubhouse was constructed in 2007 and was officially opened by The Open Champion, Pádraig Harrington, in September of that year.

The club shares its name with a Limerick Golf Club located in Montgomery County, Pennsylvania, USA, which is a public facility.
