= Limerick =

City in Ireland

Limerick Luimneach (Irish)
- City
- King John's Castle and Thomond Bridge Riverpoint Daniel O'Connell monument St John's Cathedral St Mary's Cathedral

- Coat of arms
- Nicknames: The Treaty City, Shannonside
- Motto: Latin: Urbs Antiqua Fuit; Studiisque Asperrima Belli "There was an ancient city very fierce in the skills of war"
- Location within Ireland Location within Europe
- Coordinates: 52.6653°N 8.6238°W
- Country: Ireland
- Province: Munster
- Region: Southern (Mid-West)
- County: Limerick
- Founded: 812 AD
- City Rights: 1197 AD

Government
  - Local Authority: Limerick City and County Council
  - Mayor: John Moran (Ind)
  - Local electoral areas: Limerick City East; Limerick City North; Limerick City West
  - Dáil constituency: Limerick City
  - European Parliament: South

Area
  - Total: 61.3 km^{2} (23.7 sq mi)
- Elevation: 10 m (33 ft)

Population (2022)
  - Total: 102,287
  - Rank: 3rd
  - Density: 1,669/km^{2} (4,320/sq mi)
  - Metro: 162,413
- Demonyms: Limerickman, Shannonsider, Treatyman
- Time zone: UTC0 (WET)
  - Summer (DST): UTC+1 (IST)
- Eircode Routing Key: V94
- Telephone Area Code: 061(+353 61)
- Vehicle Index Mark Code: L
- Website: Official website

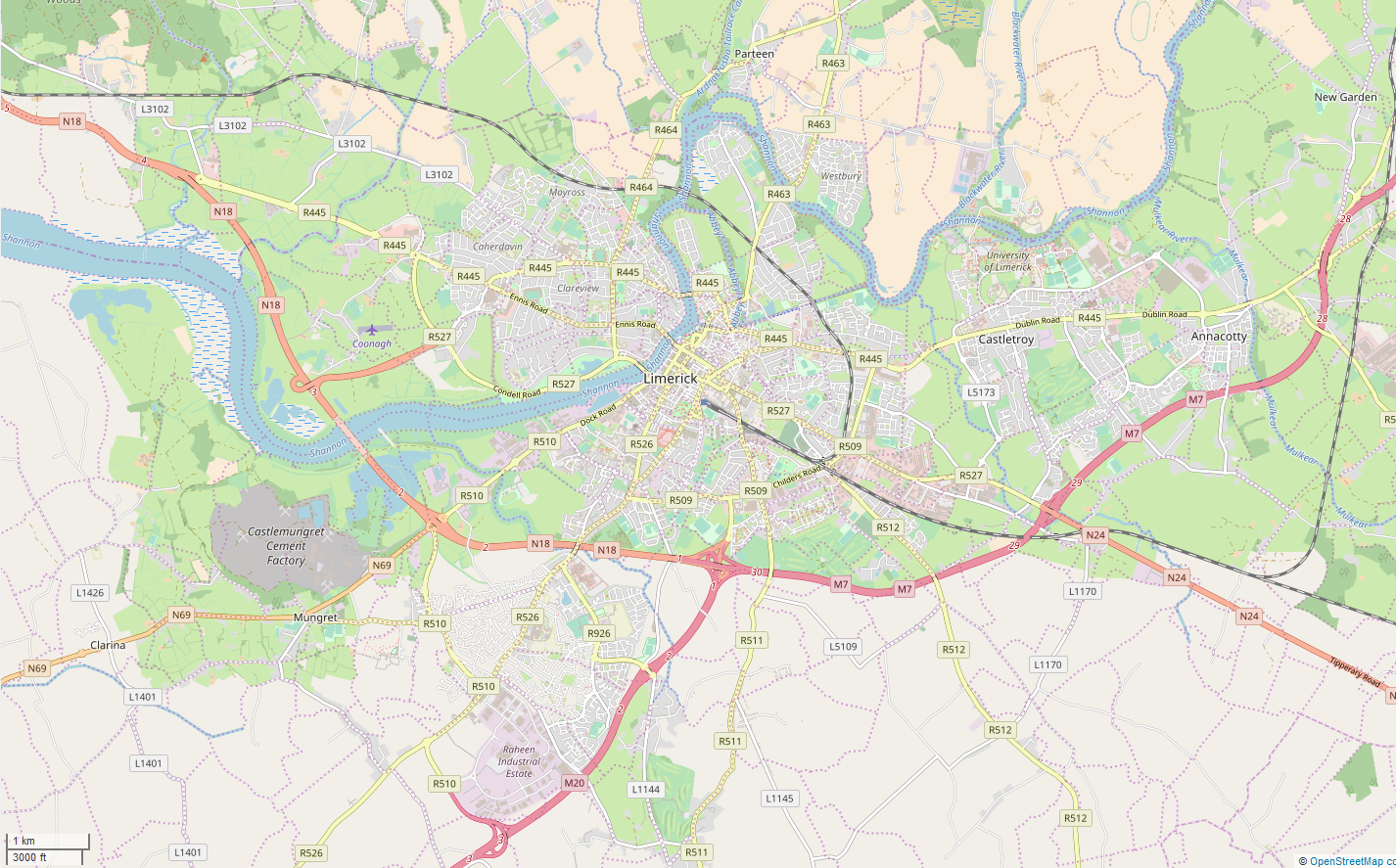
Map of Limerick

Limerick (/ˈlɪmərɪk/ LIM-ər-ik; Irish: Luimneach [ˈl̪ˠɪmʲ(ə)nʲəx]) is a city in western Ireland, in County Limerick. It is in the province of Munster and is in the Mid-West which comprises part of the Southern Region. With a population of 102,287 at the 2022 census, Limerick is the third-most populous urban area in Ireland, and the fourth-most populous city on the island of Ireland. It was founded by Scandinavian settlers in 812, during the Viking Age.

The city straddles the River Shannon, with the historic core of the city located on King's Island, which is bounded by the Shannon and Abbey Rivers. Limerick is at the head of the Shannon Estuary, where the river widens before it flows into the Atlantic Ocean. Limerick City and County Council is the local authority for the city.

== Geography and metropolitan area ==
Limerick is located on the River Shannon with four main river-crossing points near the city centre. To the south of the city is the Golden Vale, an area of rich pastureland. Historically, much of the city's industry was based on this agricultural hinterland.

On 1 June 2014, following the amalgamation of the separate local government areas of the county of Limerick and the local government area of the city of Limerick to form Limerick City and County, a new Metropolitan District of Limerick was formed within the united council, which extended the city area. The Metropolitan District includes the city urban area and extends outwards towards Patrickswell in the west and Castleconnell in the east. The City Metropolitan Area however excludes city suburbs located within County Clare. At the 2016 census, the Metropolitan District of Limerick had a population of 104,952.

== History ==
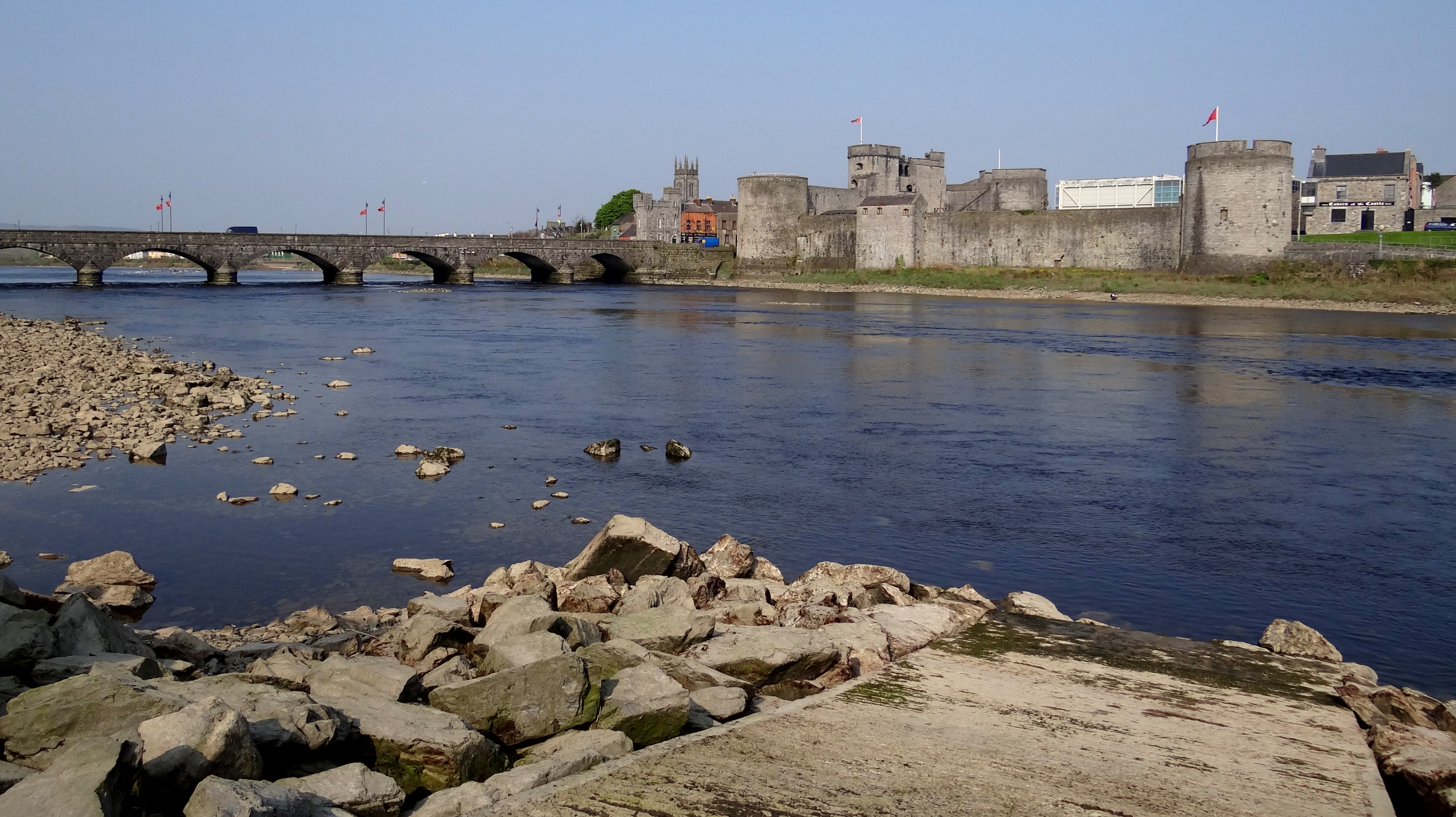
King John's Castle on the River Shannon

=== Ancient and medieval history ===
Luimneach originally referred to the general area along the banks of the Shannon Estuary known as Loch Luimnigh. The earliest settlement, Inis Sibhtonn, was the original name for King's Island during the pre-Viking and Viking eras. This island was also called Inis an Ghaill Duibh, 'The Dark Foreigner's Island'. The name is recorded in Viking sources as Hlymrekr.

The settlement dates from 812; however, history suggests the presence of earlier settlements in the area surrounding King's Island, the island at the historical city centre. Antiquity's map-maker, Ptolemy, produced in 150 AD the earliest map of Ireland, showing a place called Regia at the same site as King's Island. History also records an important battle involving Cormac mac Airt in 221 and a visit by Saint Patrick in 434 to baptise a Dál gCais king, Carthann Finn. Saint Munchin, the first bishop of Limerick died in 652, indicating the settlement was a place of some note then. In 812 the Vikings sailed up the Shannon and pillaged the settlement, burned Mungret Abbey but were forced to flee when the Irish attacked and killed many of their number. The Normans redesigned the city in the 12th century and added much of the most notable architecture, such as King John's Castle and St Mary's Cathedral.

In early medieval times Limerick was at the centre of the Kingdom of Thomond which corresponds to the present day County Clare, the Kingdom also included North Kerry and parts of South Offaly. One of the kingdom's most notable kings was Brian Boru, ancestor of the O'Brien Clan of Dalcassians. The word Thomond is synonymous with the region and is retained in place names such as Thomondgate, Thomond Bridge and Thomond Park.

=== Late Renaissance/Early modern history ===
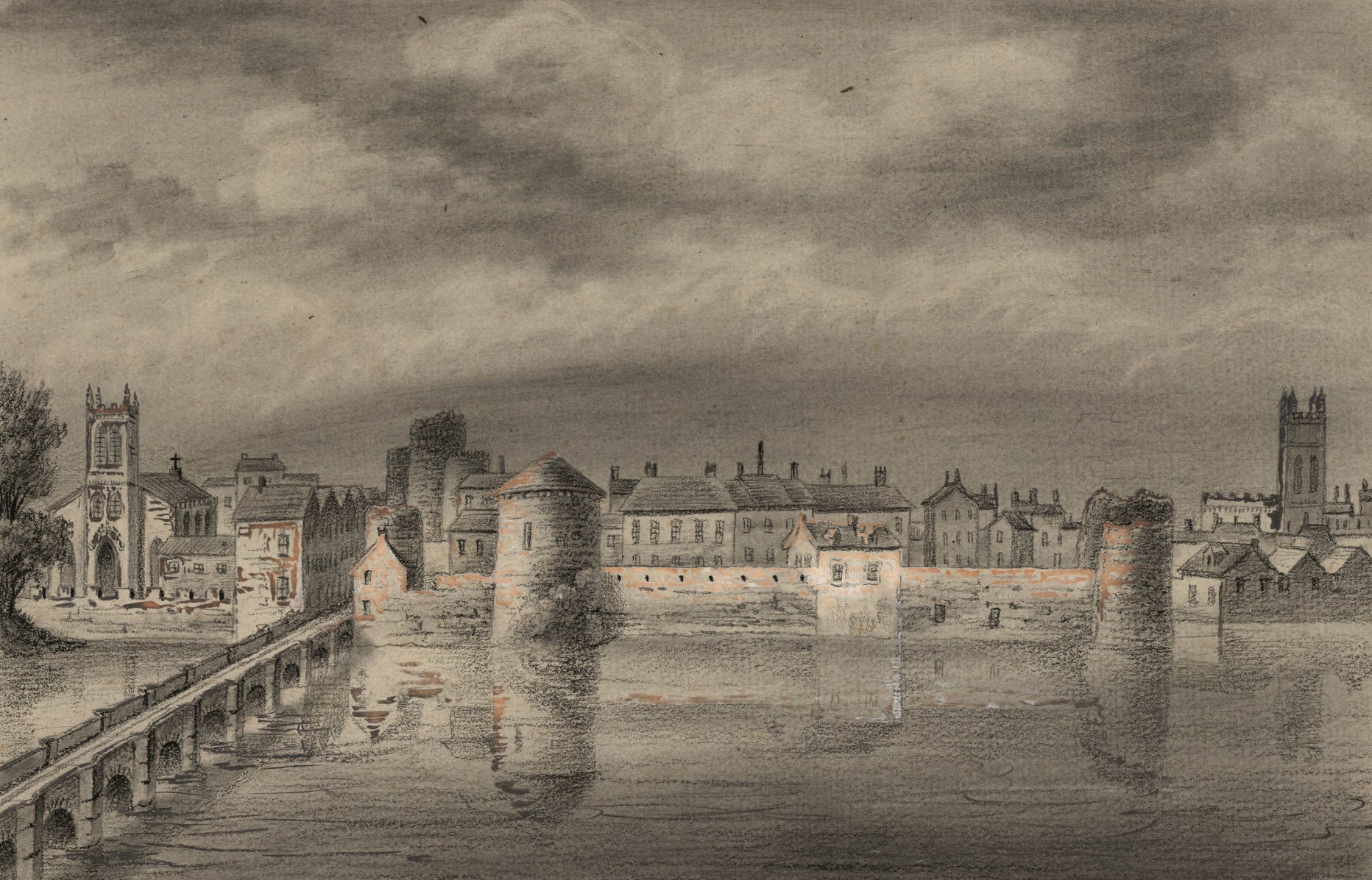
Limerick, painted in 1830

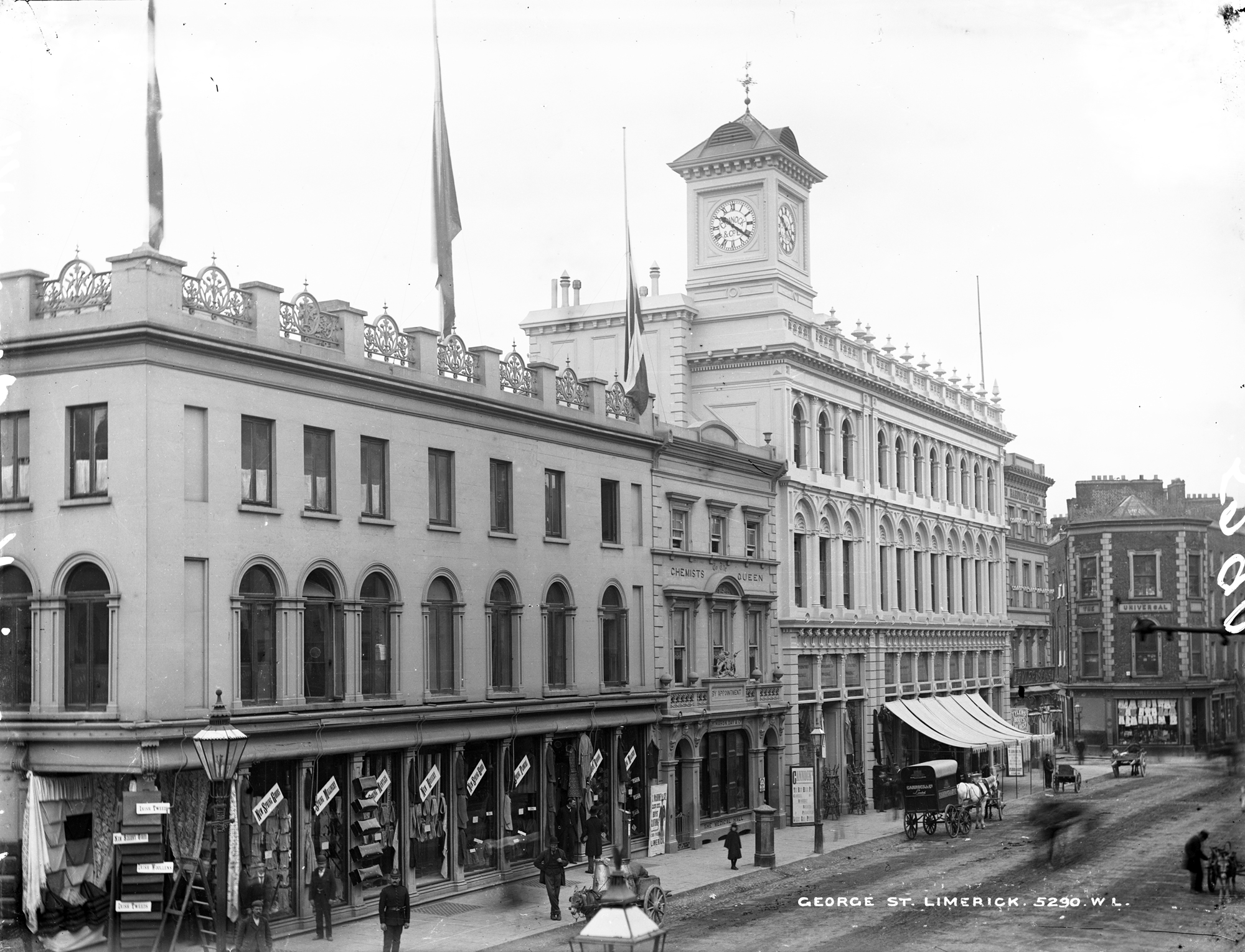
Cannock's Department Store on O'Connell Street in the early 20th Century

The English-born judge Luke Gernon, a resident of Limerick, wrote in 1620 that at his first sight of the city, he had been taken by its "lofty buildings of marble, like the Colleges in Oxford".

During the civil wars of the 17th century, the city played a pivotal role, besieged by Oliver Cromwell in 1651 and twice by the Williamites in the 1690s. The Treaty of Limerick ended the Williamite war in Ireland which was fought between supporters of the Catholic King James II (Jacobites) and the Protestant King William of Orange (Williamites). The treaty offered toleration to Catholicism and full legal rights to Catholics that swore an oath of loyalty to William III and Mary II. The Treaty was of national significance as it ensured closer British and Protestant dominance over Ireland. The articles of the Treaty protecting Catholic rights were not passed by the Protestant Irish Parliament which rather updated the Penal Laws against Catholics which had major implications for Irish history. Reputedly the Treaty was signed on the Treaty Stone, an irregular block of limestone which once served as a mounting block for horses. This stone is now displayed on a pedestal at Clancy Strand. Because of the treaty, Limerick is sometimes known as the Treaty City. This turbulent period earned the city its motto: urbs antiqua fuit studiisque asperrima belli (an ancient city well studied in the arts of war).

The peaceful times that followed the turmoil of the late 17th century allowed the city to prosper through trade in the late 18th century. During this time Limerick Port established itself as one of Ireland's major commercial ports exporting agricultural produce from one of Ireland's most fertile areas, the Golden Vale, to Britain and America. This increase in trade and wealth, particularly amongst the city's merchant classes saw a rapid expansion of the city as Georgian Limerick began to take shape. This gave the city its present-day look, including the extensive terraced streets of Georgian townhouses which remain in the city centre today. The Waterford and Limerick Railway linked the city to the Dublin–Cork railway line in 1848 and to Waterford in 1853. The opening of a number of secondary railways in the subsequent decades developed Limerick as a regional centre of communications. However, the economic downturn in the European conflicts of the French Revolution and Napoleonic eras, and following the Act of Union 1800, and the impact of the Great Irish Famine of 1848 caused much of the 19th century to be a more troubled period.

=== 20th-century history ===
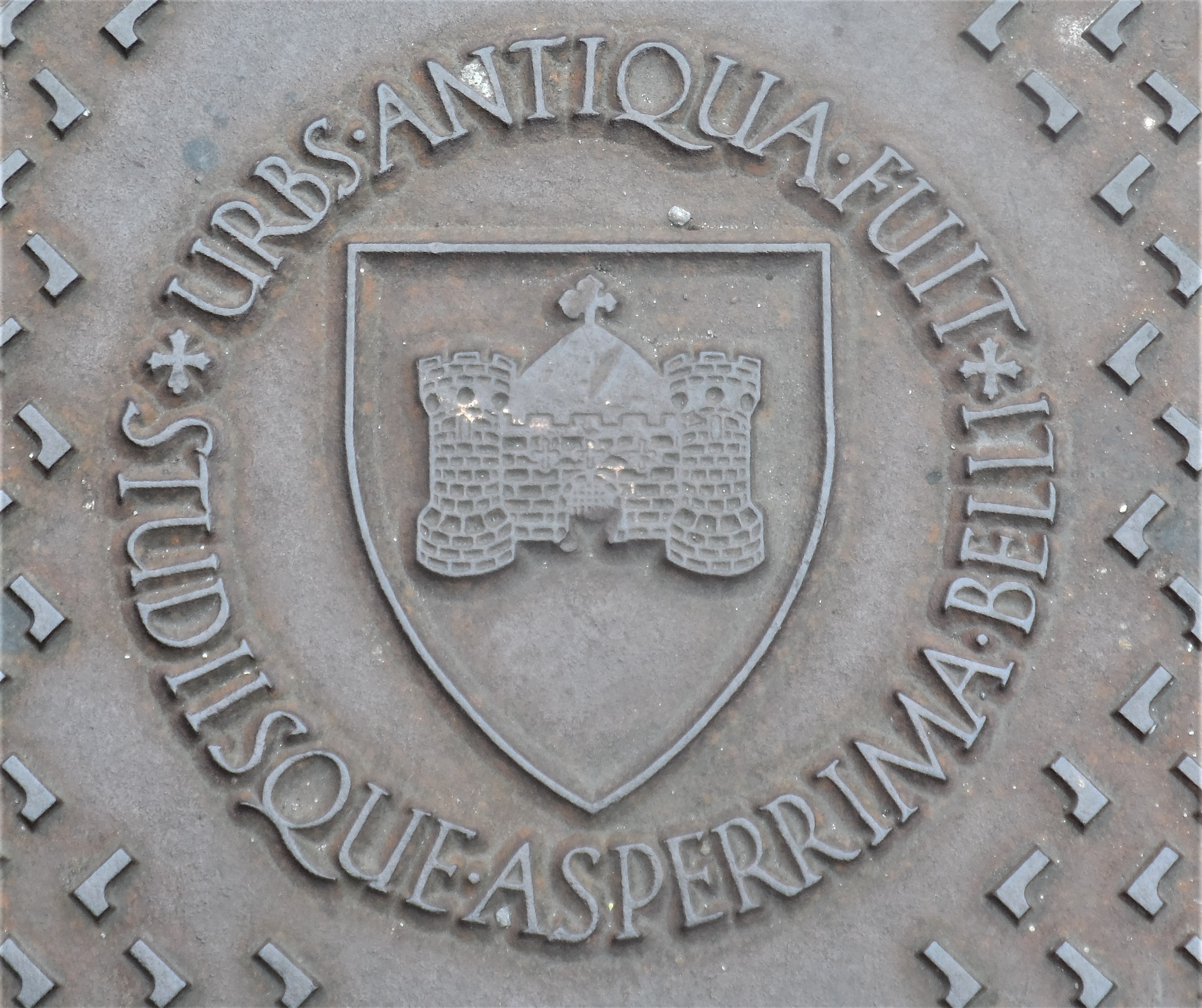
City arms on a manhole cover

The Limerick boycott was an economic boycott waged against the small Jewish community for over two years in the first decade of the 20th century. It was accompanied by a number of assaults, stone-throwing and intimidation, which caused many Jews to leave the city. It was instigated in 1904 by a Redemptorist priest, Father John Creagh.

During the Irish War of Independence, the Limerick Soviet was a self-declared soviet that existed from 15 to 27 April 1919. A general strike was organised by the Limerick Trades and Labour Council, as a protest against the British Army's declaration of a "Special Military Area" under the Defence of the Realm Act, which covered most of Limerick city and a part of the county. During the strike a special strike committee was set up to print their own money, control food prices and publish newspapers.

By the mid-20th century, Limerick was characterised by economic stagnation and decline as many traditional industries closed or left the city. However, there were some success stories. In 1942 Shannon Airport (located in County Clare, 20 km west of the city) opened for the first time offering transatlantic flights. In 1959, Shannon Airport enabled the opening of the Shannon Free Zone which attracted a large number of multinational companies to the region. A long campaign for a third-level educational institute to be located in the city finally bore fruit with the establishment of NIHE Limerick in 1969 which eventually became the University of Limerick in 1989.

== Demographics ==
Historical population
Year	Pop.	±%
1659	3,105	—
1821	59,045	+1801.6%
1831	66,554	+12.7%
1841	48,391	−27.3%
1851	48,785	+0.8%
1861	43,924	−10.0%
1871	39,353	−10.4%
1881	38,562	−2.0%
1891	37,155	−3.6%
1901	38,151	+2.7%
1911	38,518	+1.0%
1926	39,448	+2.4%
1936	41,061	+4.1%
1946	42,970	+4.6%
1951	50,820	+18.3%
1956	51,666	+1.7%
1961	51,732	+0.1%
1966	58,082	+12.3%
1971	57,161	−1.6%
1979	60,665	+6.1%
1981	60,736	+0.1%
1986	56,279	−7.3%
1991	52,083	−7.5%
1996	52,039	−0.1%
2002	54,023	+3.8%
2006	59,790	+10.7%
2011	56,779	−5.0%
2016	94,192	+65.9%
2022	102,287	+8.6%

Limerick is the third-largest city in the Republic of Ireland (after Dublin and Cork), with a population of 102,287 in the urban area and 104,952 in the metropolitan district, according to the 2016 CSO census. the 2011 census had reported a large population decline in central city areas due in part to the Limerick regeneration process where in these areas the largest reduction was reported nationally and also to outward migration following the collapse of the local and national economy from 2008 onwards. The population of the Limerick Larger Urban Zone as defined by the EU is 162,413. The ethnic diversity in Limerick's population, which includes a large immigrant community, saw rapid growth during the Celtic Tiger and the following decade. As of the 2016 census the Polish community was one of the largest demographic groups in the Municipal District, with approximately 4,000 living and working in the area. In late 2006, it was proposed that Ireland's first Polish bank could open in the area during 2007.

Limerick has a large stock of local authority housing. Before the amalgamation of Limerick City and County Council, 41% of all housing within the old Limerick City Council boundary was local authority, which was the highest in Ireland. This figure is however no longer accurate given the larger metropolitan district of the city.

As of the 2022 census, the ethnic makeup of the city was 76.53% white total, including 67.47% white Irish and 8.53% other white people, 13.52% not stated, 5.48% Asian, 2.31% other and 2.14% black. The city's religious makeup in 2022 was 61.31% Catholic, 14.11% no religion, 13.91% not stated, and 10.66% other religions.

== Government and politics ==
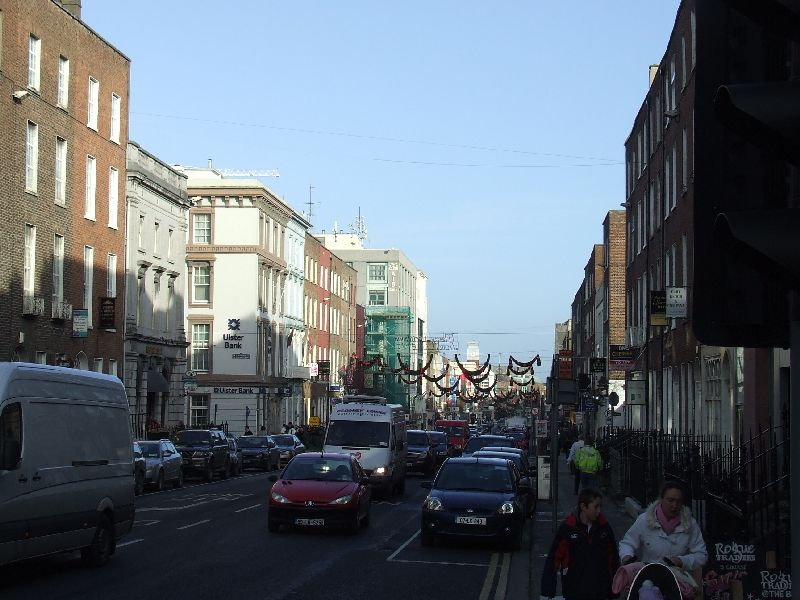
O'Connell Street, Limerick

=== Local government ===
Limerick city is under the jurisdiction of Limerick City and County Council, which is based at City Hall, Limerick. The council has responsibility for local services such as sanitation, planning and development, libraries, collection of motor taxation, local roads and social housing in the city. The council comprises elected councillors with an appointed full-time CEO as the city (and county) manager. Local elections are held every five years and the councillors annually elect a Cathaoirleach or chairperson to chair the council. Limerick City and County council was the first local authority in Ireland to have a directly elected mayor. In May 2019, residents voted in favour of a proposal for a directly elected mayor. Elections were held in conjunction with local government and European elections on 7 June 2024. John Moran was subsequently announced as the first directly elected mayor. Former well-known mayors include TDs Donogh O'Malley, Stephen Coughlan, Michael Lipper, Jim Kemmy and Jan O'Sullivan.

Throughout most of the city's history, from 1197 when it gained its first charter, Limerick City had its own local government authority, Limerick Corporation later known as Limerick City Council. The council was one of the oldest in Ireland and was only exceeded in age by Dublin City Council. In October 2012 the Government of Ireland published Putting People First- Action Programme for Effective Local Government which set out government policy for reforms across all the main areas of local government in Ireland. Among the recommendations was the merging of Limerick City Council with Limerick County Council. The changes came into effect on 1 June 2014 following the implementation of the Local Government Reform Act 2014.

By the 1960s onwards the city had outgrown its boundary considerably; the city boundary was only altered slightly and never reflected the overall urban area of the city. A limited boundary extension on the city's north side in 2008 enlarged the city boundary by 1,020 hectares increasing the city's area by almost 50% and raising the population by an estimated 7,000. The previous boundary, encompassing 2,086 hectares, was delineated in 1950. Newer suburban districts such as Dooradoyle, Castletroy – including the University, Gouldavoher, and Raheen were continually administered to by Limerick County Council until the merger of the two authorities in June 2014. This local government structure in Limerick caused a number of inefficiencies, most notably in the area of planning. A number of suburbs such as Westbury and Parteen to the north of the city are governed by Clare County Council.

Following the merger of the two authorities in 2014, a new Metropolitan District of Limerick City was set up that included the city urban area and also settlements close to the city such as Patrickswell and Castleconnell. The Metropolitan district returns 21 councillors to Limerick City and County Council which in total has 40 councillors returned from across Limerick City and County. The Limerick City Metropolitan District is divided into 3 local electoral areas: Limerick City East, Limerick City North and Limerick City South which elect eight, six and seven councillors respectively.

Following the 2024 local elections, Fine Gael is the largest party on the authority with 13 seats followed by Fianna Fáil with 10, Labour and Sinn Féin with 3 each, and Independent Ireland and the Social Democrats with 2 each, and Aontú and the Green Party with 1 seat each, and independents and other parties the remaining 5 seats.

=== National politics ===
For elections to the Dáil, Limerick City is in the Limerick City constituency. From 2011, the constituency boundaries changed in accordance with the proposals of the Constituency Commission and the subsequent Electoral (Amendment) Act 2009. This changed the electoral boundaries from Limerick East and Limerick West to Limerick City and Limerick. Limerick city encompasses the city, the suburban areas of Castletroy and as far east as Murroe. It also includes part of North County Tipperary. The Limerick county constituency takes in most of the rest of the county. For European Parliament elections, Limerick is in the South constituency.

== Climate ==
Limerick's climate is classified as temperate oceanic (Köppen Cfb). Met Éireann maintains a climatological weather observation station at Shannon Airport, 21 kilometres west-northwest of the city in County Clare. Shannon Airport records an average of 977 millimetres of precipitation annually, most of which is rain. Limerick has a mild climate, with an average daily maximum in July of 20 °C (68 °F) and an average daily minimum in January of 3 °C (37 °F). The highest temperature recorded was 32.0 °C (89.6 °F) in June 2018, and the lowest −11.4 °C (11.5 °F) in 2010. Limerick is the cloudiest city in the country, averaging only 1,295 sunshine hours annually, 3.5 hours of sunshine every day. There are on average 62 days of no recordable sunshine, 6 days of thunder, 22 days of hail, 32 days of fog and 11 days of snow per year. Shannon Airport is situated on the Shannon Estuary at an elevation of 14 metres.

Climate data for Shannon Airport (SNN) (1991-2020 normals, extremes 1938-present)
Month	Jan	Feb	Mar	Apr	May	Jun	Jul	Aug	Sep	Oct	Nov	Dec	Year
Record high °C (°F)	14.8 (58.6)	15.5 (59.9)	20.2 (68.4)	25.0 (77.0)	30.6 (87.1)	32.0 (89.6)	30.8 (87.4)	30.0 (86.0)	27.9 (82.2)	23.0 (73.4)	18.2 (64.8)	16.2 (61.2)	32.0 (89.6)
Mean daily maximum °C (°F)	8.9 (48.0)	9.4 (48.9)	10.9 (51.6)	13.4 (56.1)	16.0 (60.8)	18.3 (64.9)	19.5 (67.1)	19.1 (66.4)	17.5 (63.5)	14.2 (57.6)	11.1 (52.0)	9.2 (48.6)	14.0 (57.2)
Daily mean °C (°F)	6.1 (43.0)	6.3 (43.3)	7.5 (45.5)	9.6 (49.3)	12.0 (53.6)	14.5 (58.1)	16.0 (60.8)	15.8 (60.4)	14.1 (57.4)	11.2 (52.2)	8.3 (46.9)	6.4 (43.5)	10.7 (51.3)
Mean daily minimum °C (°F)	3.3 (37.9)	3.3 (37.9)	4.0 (39.2)	5.8 (42.4)	8.1 (46.6)	10.8 (51.4)	12.6 (54.7)	12.4 (54.3)	10.7 (51.3)	8.1 (46.6)	5.5 (41.9)	3.7 (38.7)	7.4 (45.3)
Record low °C (°F)	−11.9 (10.6)	−9.8 (14.4)	−7.8 (18.0)	−4.6 (23.7)	−1.7 (28.9)	0.9 (33.6)	4.4 (39.9)	2.8 (37.0)	−0.6 (30.9)	−3.3 (26.1)	−7.2 (19.0)	−11.4 (11.5)	−11.9 (10.6)
Average precipitation mm (inches)	103.8 (4.09)	86.7 (3.41)	75.8 (2.98)	62.3 (2.45)	63.1 (2.48)	69.6 (2.74)	75.8 (2.98)	87.6 (3.45)	77.4 (3.05)	95.5 (3.76)	106.6 (4.20)	115.4 (4.54)	1,019.7 (40.15)
Average precipitation days (≥ 0.2 mm)	21.3	18.3	18	16.2	16.2	15.5	18.3	19	17.7	19.9	21.6	21	223
Average snowy days	1.5	1.8	1.2	0.3	0.0	0.0	0.0	0.0	0.0	0.0	0.1	1.0	5.9
Average relative humidity (%)	85.8	83.7	80.5	77.2	76.1	76.7	79.8	80.7	82.1	84.2	86.8	86.9	81.7
Average dew point °C (°F)	4.1 (39.4)	3.9 (39.0)	4.3 (39.7)	5.5 (41.9)	7.8 (46.0)	10.2 (50.4)	12.3 (54.1)	12.3 (54.1)	10.9 (51.6)	8.6 (47.5)	6.4 (43.5)	4.6 (40.3)	7.6 (45.7)
Mean monthly sunshine hours	52.3	68.9	111.1	162.3	182.5	164.5	134.9	142.5	118.1	93.4	61.8	46.2	1,338.5
Source 1: Met Éireann
Source 2: NOAA Servizio Meteorologico (extremes)

== Culture ==
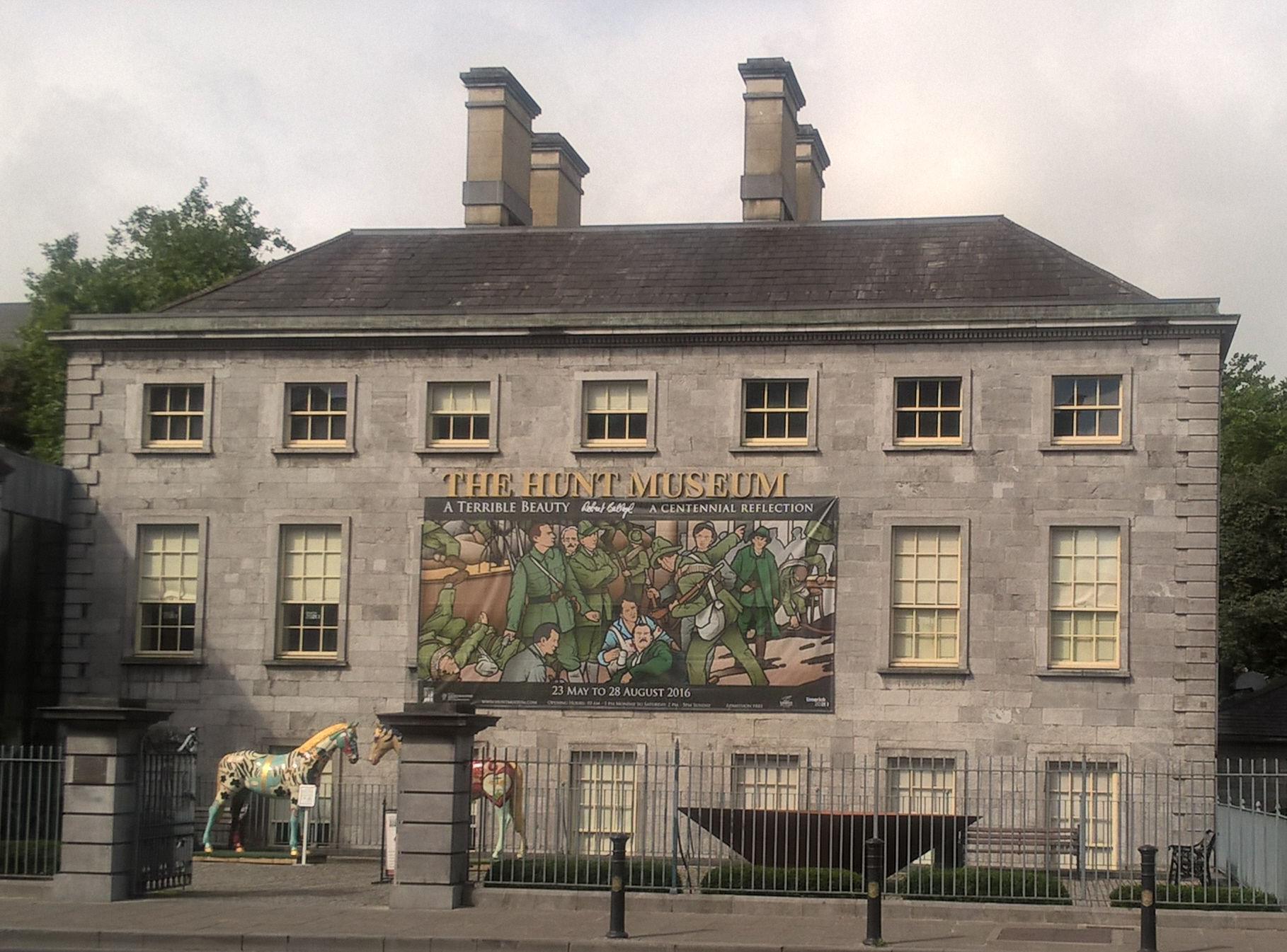
Hunt Museum

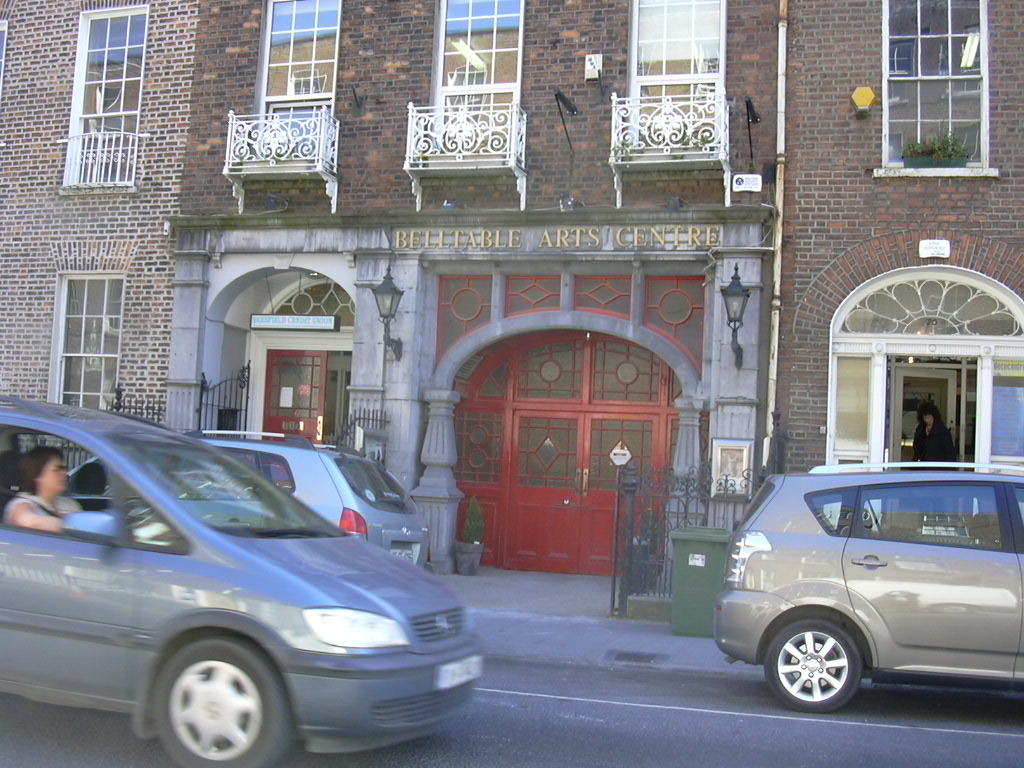
The Belltable Theatre

In 2014, Limerick became Ireland's inaugural National City of Culture, with a variety of artistic and cultural events occurring at locations around the city throughout the year.

=== Art ===
The Limerick City Gallery of Art on Pery Square is the city's chief venue for contemporary art exhibitions. It is home to a permanent collection of Irish art, which shows works from the early 18th to 20th century. The gallery houses the National Collection of Contemporary Drawing founded by the artist Samuel Walsh in 1987. Limerick's major contemporary art event is EVA International, Ireland's Biennial of Contemporary Art. EVA International, centred mainly in the Limerick City Gallery of Art, is curated by varying guest curators and includes contemporary artworks by both international and Irish artists.

Other Limerick arts groups include Contact Studios, which provides individual studio spaces for visual artists; Ormston House, a meeting place for the arts; and Limerick Printmakers Studio and Gallery, which provides printmaking facilities, a venue for exhibitions and events and an education programme.

=== Theatre ===
The Lime Tree Theatre officially opened at the Mary Immaculate College campus in October 2012. The venue hosts theatre, music, comedy, traditional arts, schools' performances, and conferences.

The Belltable on O'Connell Street hosts local playwrights and drama productions. The University Concert Hall located in the University of Limerick is a 1,000 seat venue and provides a large venue for national and international acts to visit the city. Limerick is also the home of street theatre companies, including Lumen Street Theatre, Impact Theatre Company, and Bottomdog Theatre Company.

=== Literature ===
Limerick's literature scene is supported by projects like the Limerick Writers' Centre, which was established in 2008 and runs a range of writing activities in the city. Limerick natives include Pulitzer Prize-winning author Frank McCourt, and novelists Kate O'Brien, Michael Curtin, Kevin Barry and Donal Ryan. Poets from Limerick include Michael Hogan, Desmond O'Grady, and John Liddy. The Limerick Literary Festival is held annually in honour of Kate O'Brien.

The city is the setting for Frank McCourt's memoir Angela's Ashes and its film adaptation. The Frank McCourt Museum situated in McCourt's former school on Hartsonge Street opened in 2011, and contains artefacts from the book. Limerick has also been the setting or location for the dramas The Real Thing (2002), Cowboys & Angels (2003) and Lost & Found (2015), among other films.

=== Music ===
The Irish Chamber Orchestra and the Irish World Music Centre are both based in the University of Limerick. The university has a thousand-seat state-of-the-art concert hall that hosts visiting performers. The city's music scene has produced bands such as The Cranberries, guitarist Noel Hogan's MonoBand, and The Hitchers. Electronic musician Richard D. James, more commonly known as Aphex Twin, was born in Limerick in 1971. The Limerick Art Gallery and the Art College cater for painting, sculpture, and performance art.

The Limerick International Band Championship is an annual competition featuring marching bands from Limerick, the rest of Ireland, and the rest of the world. It is typically held around just after Saint Patrick's Day, with the bands parading through the city centre, and attracts large crowds.

Dolan's Warehouse on the Dock Road is a venue specialising in live music, established in 1994. Between 1993 and the mid-2010s, Limerick's Trinity Rooms operated as one of the largest nightclubs in the west of Ireland. Baker Place was a nightclub that held mainly local underground nights until its closure in 2011. In 2020, it was announced that the Dromkeen-based Shiloh Trust was seeking planning permission to convert the former premises of Baker Place into a bible school.

=== Other ===
- Limerick is also home to comedians The Rubberbandits, D'Unbelievables and Karl Spain.
- The Crush 87 nightclub (formerly known as Trinity Rooms until its closure in 2010), was relaunched in 2013.
- Riverfest is a summer festival held annually in Limerick since 2004. The 2014 festival was held in May and had a record 80,000 visitors.
- As with several other towns and cities in Ireland, and some elsewhere, there is an annual Saint Patrick's Day parade.
- The Daghdha Dance Company is a contemporary dance company that has adopted a renovated church in John's Square, adjacent to St John's Cathedral, as a performance space).
- The Fresh Film Festival, which is held each spring, includes films made by young people (7–18 years).
- The Richard Harris International Film Festival is held every October.

== Humorous verse ==
A limerick is a type of humorous verse of five lines with an AABBA rhyme scheme: the poem's connection with the city is obscure, but the name is generally taken to be a reference to Limerick city or County Limerick, sometimes, particularly to the Maigue Poets, and may derive from an earlier form of nonsense verse parlour game that traditionally included a refrain that included "Will [or won't] you come (up) to Limerick?" The earliest known use of the name "Limerick" for this type of poem is an 1880 reference, in a Saint John, New Brunswick, newspaper, to a well-known tune.

== Media ==
=== Broadcasting ===
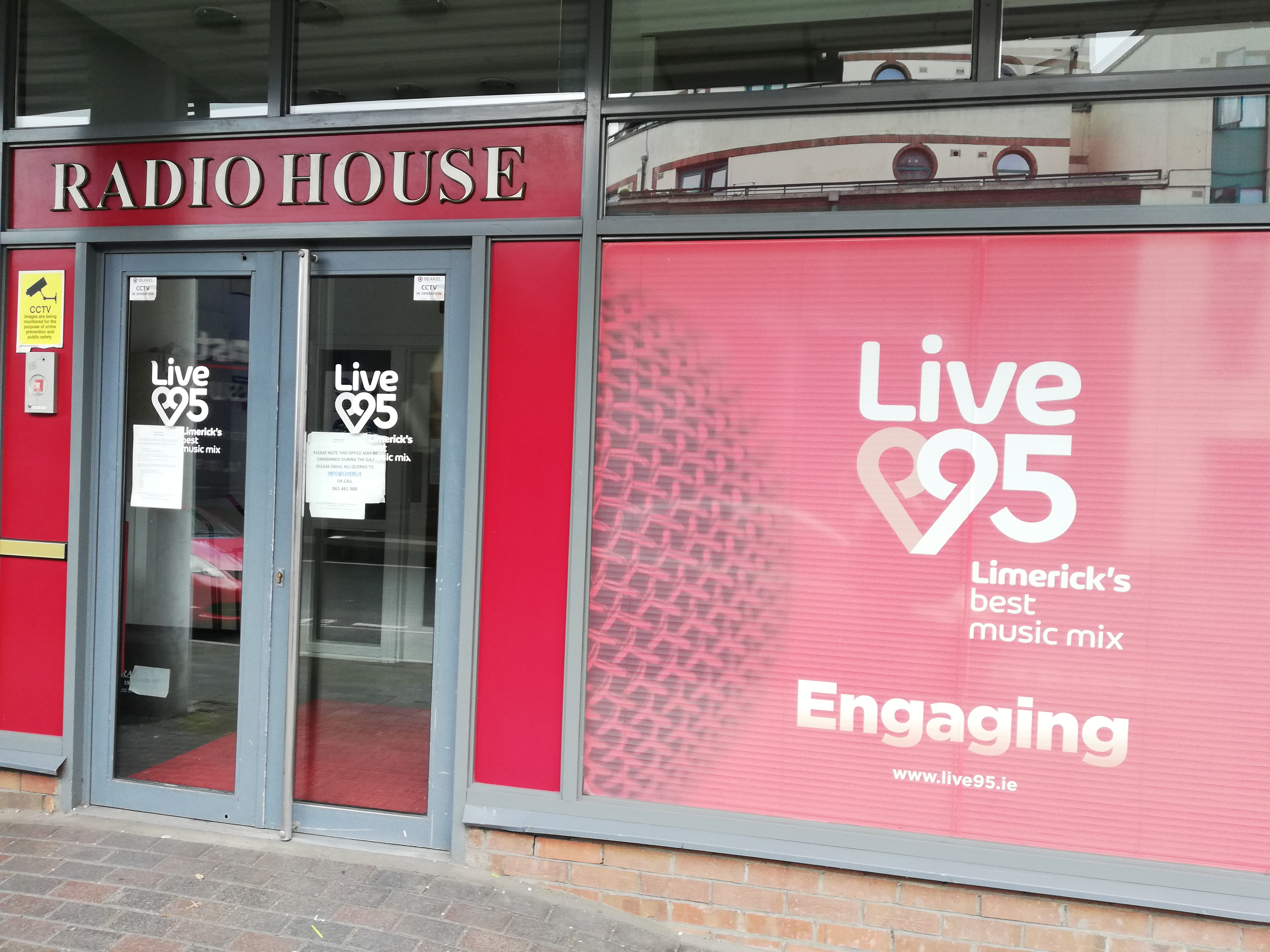
Live 95FM building in Limerick

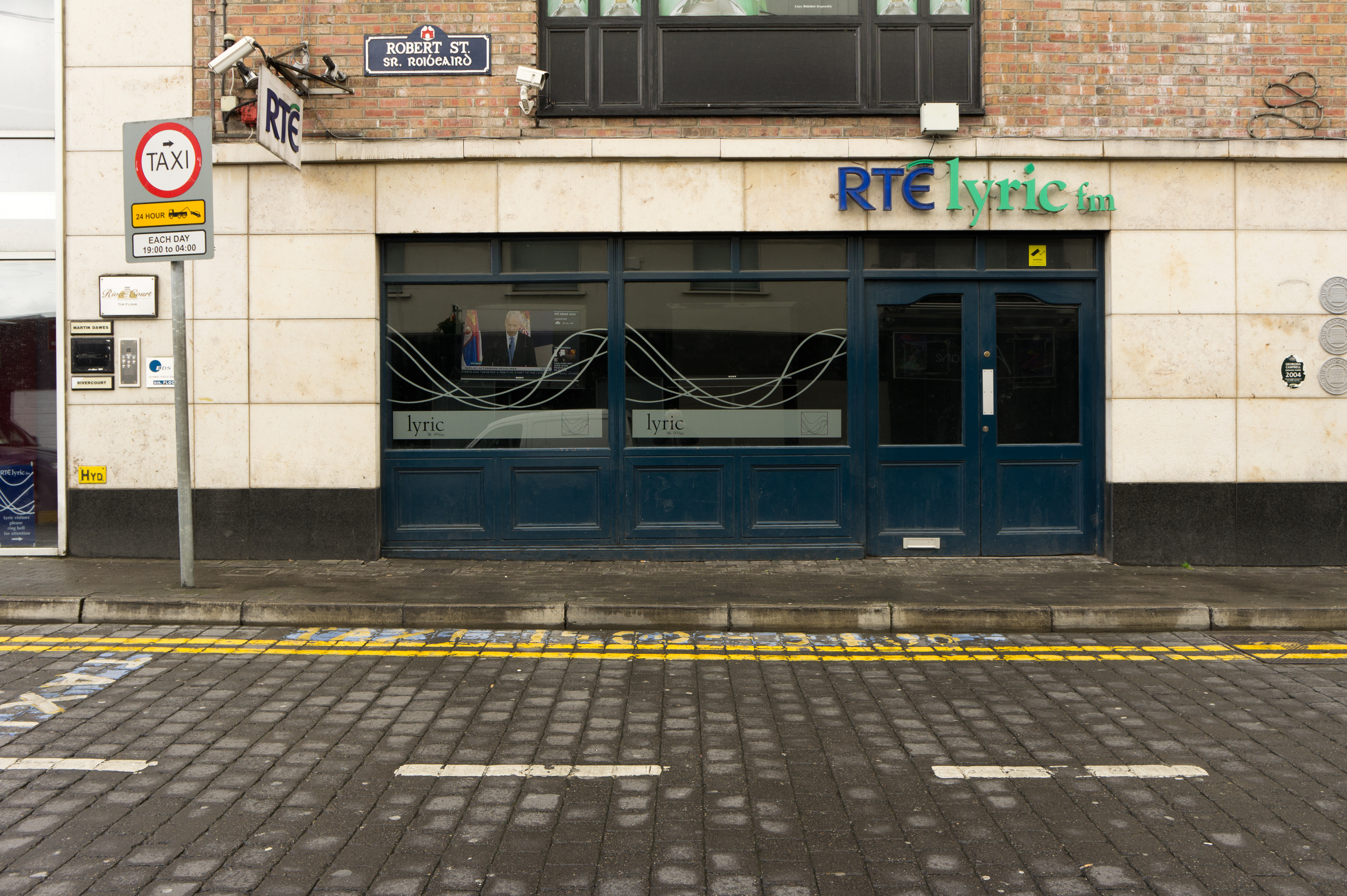
RTÉ lyric fm building

RTÉ lyric fm, a state-run classical music radio station and part of RTÉ, broadcasts nationally from studios in the city centre on Cornmarket Square which opened in 1994. Limerick's local radio station is Live 95FM, broadcasting from 'Radio House', near the waterfront at Steamboat Quay. Spin South West, owned by Communicorp, broadcasts to Counties Kerry, Clare, Limerick, Tipperary and southwest Laois from its studios at Landmark Buildings in the Raheen Industrial Estate. Student radio station, Wired FM, broadcasts on 99.9FM from Mary Immaculate College. Wired FM also has studios at Limerick Institute of Technology. Limerick City Community Radio broadcasts on 99.9FM every Saturday and Sunday. University Hospital Limerick has a radio station on 94.2FM, but this can be heard only in the hospital and surrounding area. West Limerick 102 is broadcast from Newcastle West. The national broadcaster, RTÉ, has radio and television studios in the city, which are periodically used to broadcast programming from Limerick.

=== Print ===
Several local newspapers are published in the city, including The Limerick Post and The Limerick Leader and magazines include the Limerick Event Guide, Business Limerick, and Limerick Now.

== Places of interest ==
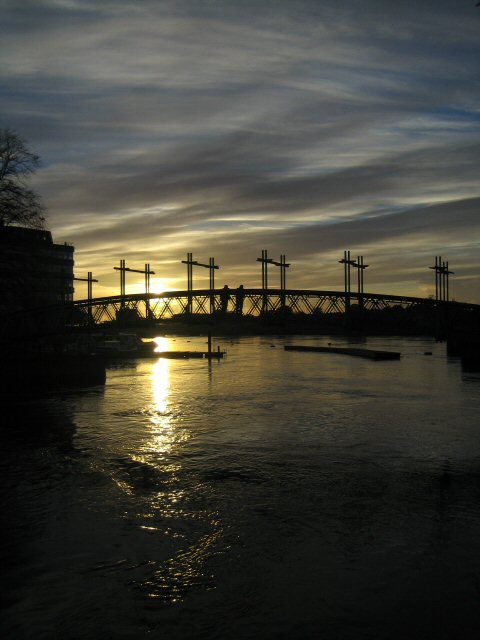
The Sylvester O'Halloran Bridge

Limerick city is approximately 25 km from Shannon Airport. Tourist attractions in the city centre include Limerick City Museum, King John's Castle (1210), St Mary's Cathedral (1168), the Hunt Museum, The People's Museum of Limerick, the University of Limerick, Georgian houses and gardens and the Treaty Stone. There are several seasonal tours, including Angela's Ashes walking tour of Limerick City, a historical walking tour, and kayaking tours along the River Shannon.

The city centre is divided between the traditional areas of "English Town" on the southern end of King's Island, which includes King John's Castle; "Irish Town", which includes the older streets on the south bank; and the current economic centre further south, called "Newtown Pery". Newtown Pery was built in the late 18th century before the Act of Union and, unusually for an Irish city and unique in Limerick, is laid out on a grid plan. The Limerick Museum (formerly aka the Jim Kemmy Municipal Museum), is located in the Old Franciscan Friary in Henry Street. It contains displays on Limerick's history and manufactures.

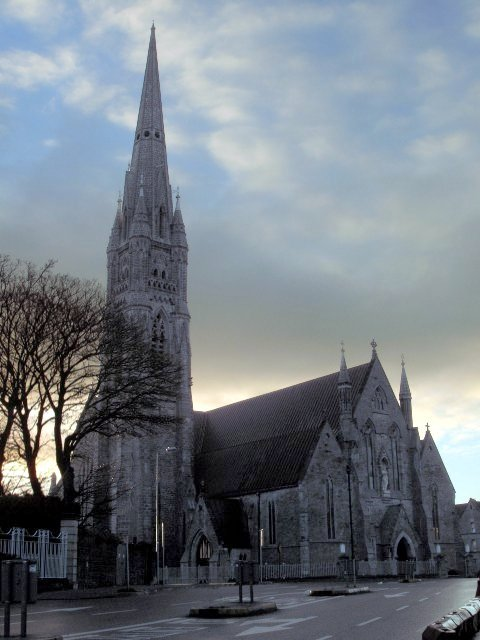
St John's Cathedral

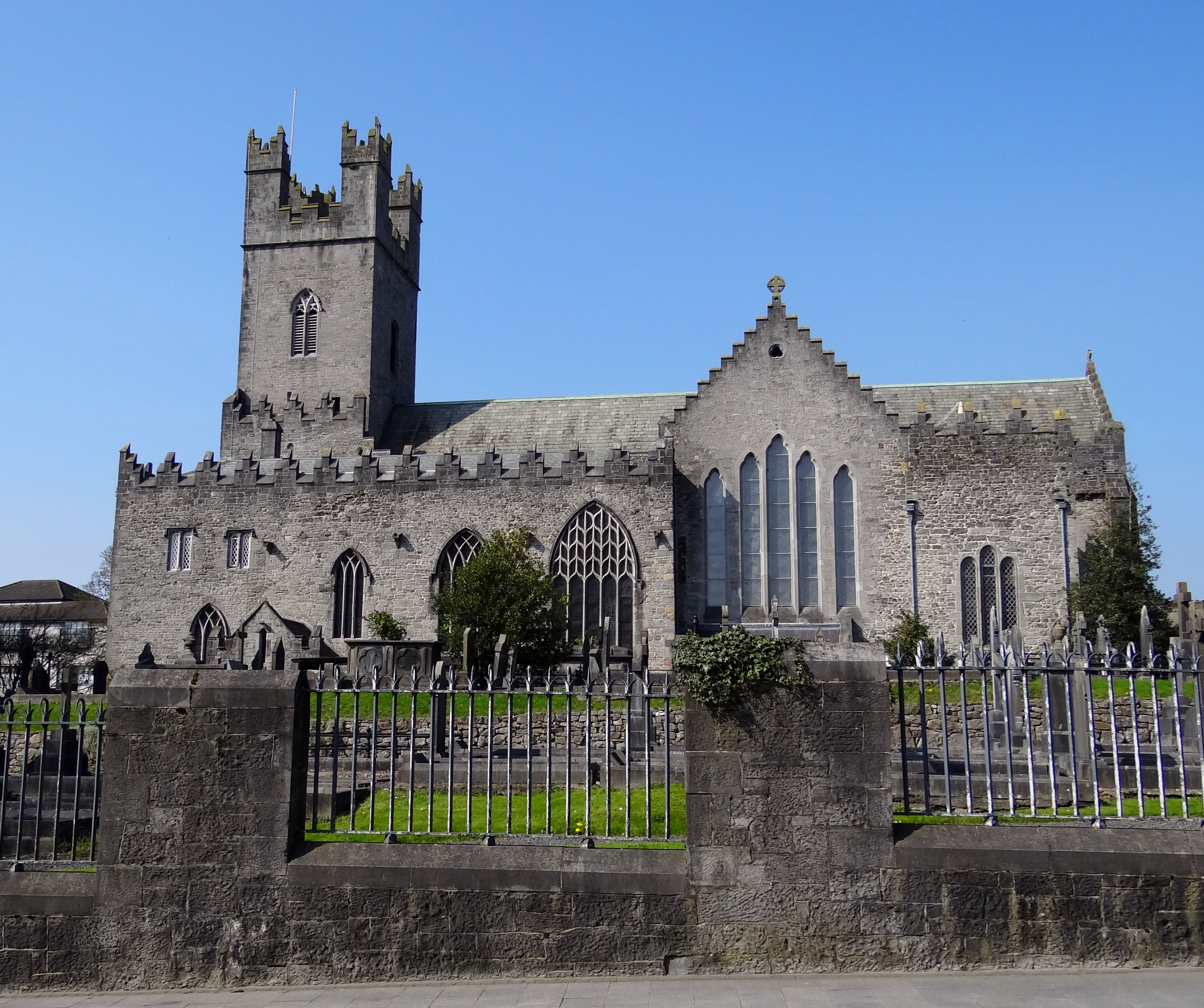
St Mary's Cathedral

The Georgian core of the city, with its Georgian architecture in the Newtown Pery, was developed from the mid-18th century. This core includes O'Connell Street (George Street before independence) from the Cecil Street intersection running to the southwest end of the Crescent, and southeast to Pery Street including Glentworth Street and Barrington Street. Other buildings of architectural note in the city are St John's Cathedral, designed by the notable Victorian architect, Philip Charles Hardwick. St Mary's Cathedral, at over 800 years old, is one of the oldest in Ireland. St John's Cathedral is more modern.

The Hunt Museum is based in the historic 18th-century former Custom House. The museum was established to house a collection of approximately 2000 works of art and antiquities formed by John and Gertrude Hunt during their lifetimes.

The main park in Limerick is the People's Park which was opened in 1877 in memory of Richard Russell, a prominent local businessman. The park is dominated by the Thomas Spring Rice memorial (MP for the city 1820–1832) and has a large collection of mature deciduous and evergreen trees.

Limerick city centre changed significantly with the construction of several modern high-rise buildings in the early 2000s, in particular as part of the regeneration of the former docks area along the Dock Road. The suburban areas, where the majority of the population now live, have grown out from the centre along the main roads to Ennis (North Circular and Ennis Road areas/Caherdavin), Dublin (Castletroy and the university) and Cork (Ballinacurra/Dooradoyle/Raheen). Suburban houses are generally two-floor semi-detached homes for single families. These were built from the 1950s onwards in large estates by government projects and commercial developments, although there are many examples of Edwardian and older 1930s suburban homes on the main suburban thoroughfares leading towards the city (North & South Circular, Ballinacurra Road, O'Connell Avenue).

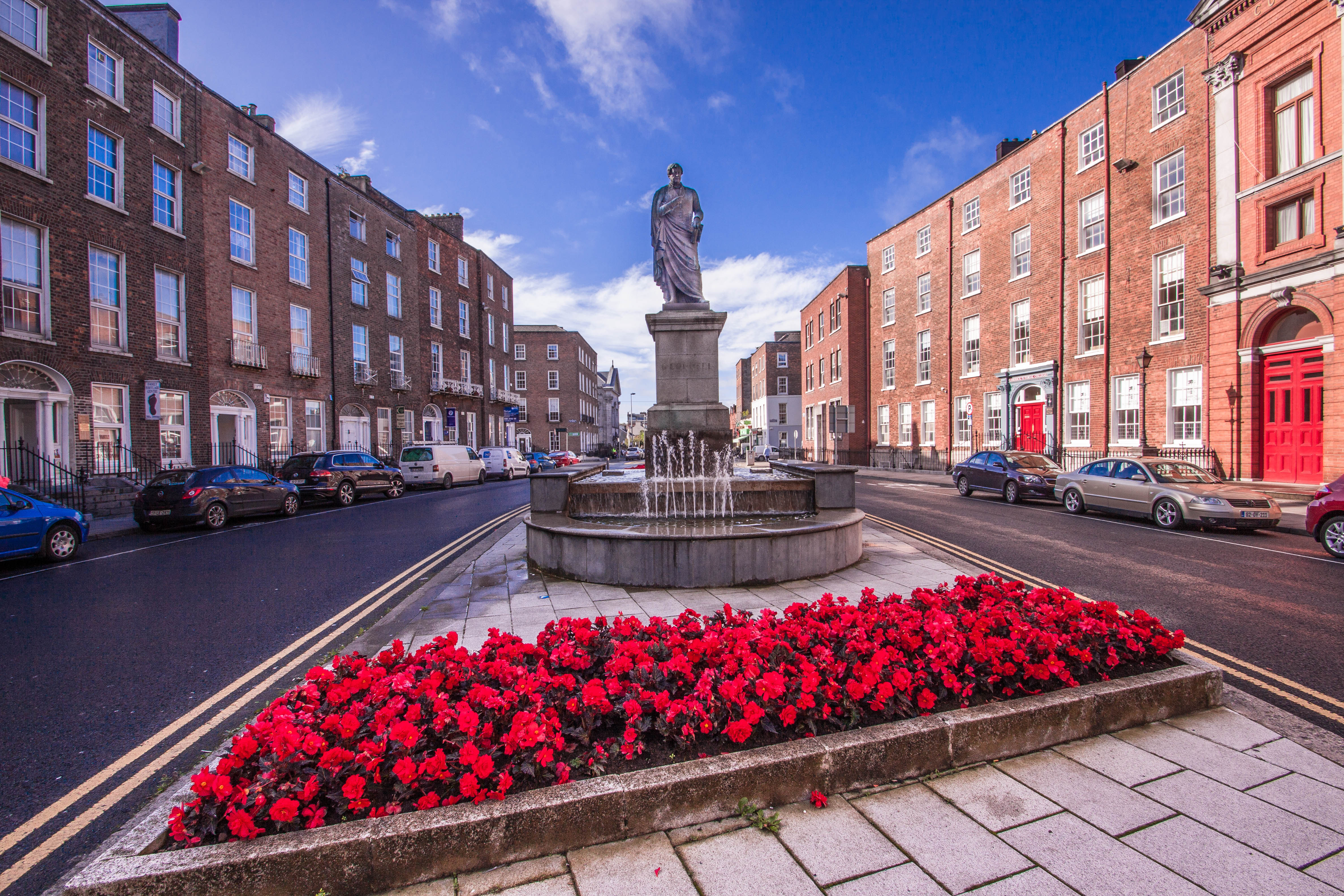
O'Connell Monument to Daniel O'Connell at The Crescent

Limerick city's nightlife is supported by a number of nightclubs and pubs which offer music. For example, Dolan's Warehouse is a small music venue that hosts local, national, and international folk, indie, jazz, rock, and traditional Irish music acts.

In County Limerick, Adare village and the Foynes Flying Boat Museum, approximately 35 km (22 miles/30 minutes) from Limerick City along the scenic coastal N69 route from Limerick to Tralee, are also attractions. Bunratty Castle in County Clare is another local attraction, and is situated 15.4 km north of the city.

== Economy ==
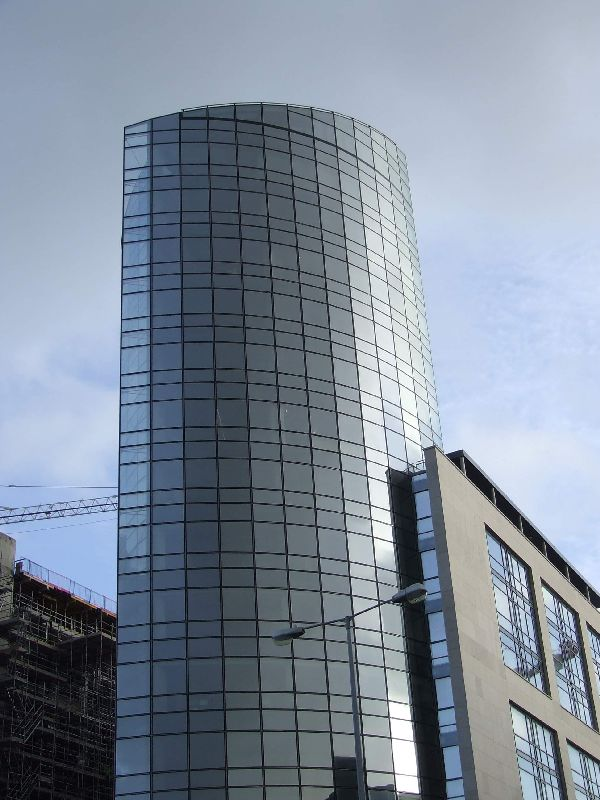
Riverpoint, Limerick's tallest building.

Limerick is in the region dubbed "the Midwest". Also known as the "Shannon Region", this is primarily an economic and social concept. The region encompasses County Limerick, County Clare , North County Tipperary, Northwest County Kerry and south County Offaly, with its focal point centred on Limerick and its environs within an 8-kilometre (5 mi) radius.

The city's economic development has been driven in part by the University of Limerick, Limerick Institute of Technology, Shannon Airport in County Clare and Shannon Development (an economic development agency), whose precursor was SFADCO (Shannon Free Airport Development Company), an economic agency that provided tax incentives to companies locating in the area surrounding Shannon Airport. Limerick Chamber of Commerce, a representative body for businesses in the region, celebrated its bicentennial/bicentenary in 2015. As of 2015, Limerick had the highest disposable income per person in Ireland outside Dublin.

Historically Limerick was an agricultural commodity-driven economy, due to its position as the first major port along the River Shannon. By the middle of the 18th century, Limerick Port grew to become one of Ireland's principal commercial ports, exporting agricultural produce from the most fertile tracts in Ireland known as the Golden Vale as well as produce from the surrounding counties. The city was one of the main meat processing areas in Ireland, and industries included confectionery and flour production. The city was known for its bacon industry, including the production of Limerick ham – however this went into decline in the mid-20th century. The fishing industry in Limerick, based on Clancy's Strand opposite King John's Castle and at Coonagh nearby, once employed hundreds of men. The boat most commonly used was the Gandelow which was also used as a small Lighter (barge) to ferry goods to and from larger ships in the port. In the 1920s the construction of a dam at Ardnacrusha severely impacted salmon breeding and that, and the introduction of quotas, had by the 1950s caused salmon fishing to diminish. By 2006, most fishermen had relinquished their drift net licences and the industry can now be said to be dormant.

As with other cities in Ireland, several multinational companies are based in Limerick, and the city is a growing recipient of foreign direct investment. Dell had its main European Manufacturing Facility at the Raheen Business Park however in January 2009 Dell announced that it would close its Limerick computer manufacturing plant and move the production lines to Poland. The facility was the largest Dell manufacturing plant outside the United States and produced 30,000–60,000 units per day for export to the EMEA. Dell remains one of the largest employers in the mid-west with over 1,000 people employed in service and support. Analog Devices has its European manufacturing base in Raheen, 3 km south-west of the city centre. The site employs more than 1,000 people. Johnson & Johnson subsidiary Vistakon (the world's largest manufacturer of contact lenses) has a large facility in Castletroy in the National Technology Park and also employs close to 1,000 people. It is Vistakon's only production facility outside the United States and one of the largest contact-lens manufacturing plants in the world. Cook Medical, the world's largest privately owned Medical Devices company, employs over 800 people in Limerick at the National Technology Park.

The Post-2008 Irish economic downturn had a profound effect on Limerick. The announcement in 2009 that Dell was to move its manufacturing facility from Limerick to Poland devastated the local economy. 1,900 jobs were lost at Dell and it is believed that for every job that was lost at Dell at least another 4 to 5 were at risk. The closure of the Dell manufacturing facility amounted to 2% of Ireland's national GDP. The downturn in the construction industry also cost many jobs as did the stalled Limerick regeneration programme which promised investment in Limerick's deprived city areas. As of 2012 unemployment had become a major problem across the city with the unemployment rate in the city at 28.6% which was almost twice the national average.

=== Retail ===
The Crescent Shopping Centre is the largest shopping centre in Ireland, outside of Dublin, and the largest in the province of Munster. It is located in Dooradoyle about 3 km south of the city centre, and has over 90 shopping outlets along with restaurants and a 12-screen Omniplex Cinema. The city centre also has a large retail district which includes a mix of more traditional type of shops as well as some modern high street stores. Cruises Street is one of the main shopping streets. O'Connell Street, William Street, Bedford Row and Thomas Street) are also retail streets within the city. The city centre saw some works on remodeling in the early 21st century, with pedestrianisation works on Bedford Row, Thomas Street and parts of Catherine Street, as well as widening footpaths on William Street. These works have sought to address a reduction of footfall in the city centre (in turn influencing the closure of many city centre retail businesses) which occurred from the recession of 2008 onwards.

==== Retail parks and shopping centres ====
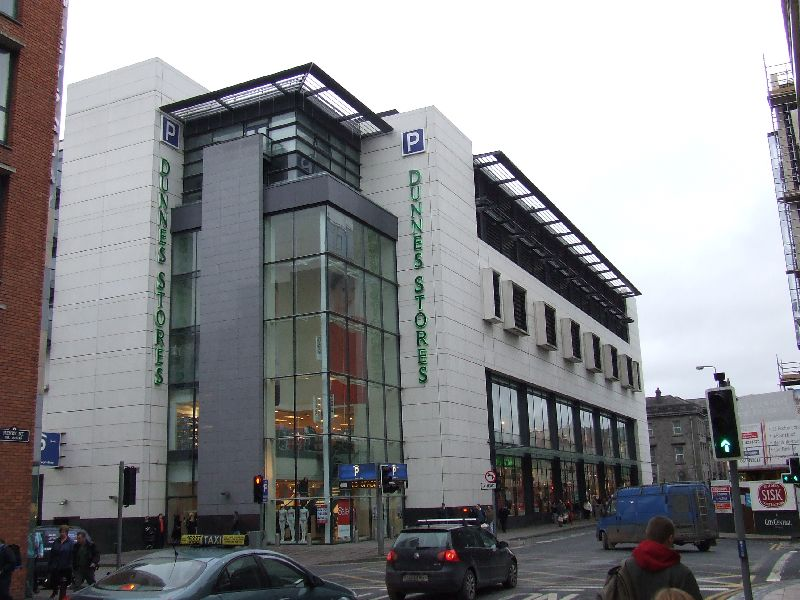
Dunnes Stores in Limerick City

During the Celtic Tiger years a number of shopping centres and retail parks opened in suburban areas of Limerick. In addition to the Crescent Shopping Centre, which expanded in the early 2000s, the Jetland Shopping Centre and Childers Road Retail Park opened in the mid-2000s. As of 2017, unfinished retail centres included the Coonagh Cross retail development and the Parkway Valley Shopping Centre on the Dublin Road.

The plans for the Opera Centre, a proposed retail development described as "one of the biggest commercial development sites in the city's history", make up part of the "Limerick 2030" scheme.

==== The Milk Market ====
The Milk Market, located at Cornmarket Row in the city centre, sells locally produced foods and products and is governed by Limerick Market Trustees. In 2010 work was undertaken to redevelop the existing premises to an all-weather, all year round facility as it operated in an outdoor environment. The work involved constructing a large canopy over the existing market premises and was officially re-opened in June 2010. The Milk Market Project won the 2011 Royal Institute of the Architects of Ireland (RIAI) 'Peoples Choice Award'.

=== Energy ===
In 2013, a renewable energy strategy was launched for the region, and proposed a 20% reduction in CO_{2}-emissions, while ensuring that short-term actions were beneficial to the long-term goal of 100% renewable energy. The strategy was completed by the Danish Aalborg University.

== Transport ==
=== Air ===
Shannon Airport is 20 km west of the city in County Clare. It is one of Ireland's main airports and is accessible from Limerick via the N18 dual carriageway and from other regions via the Limerick Tunnel. It has scheduled flights to European and North American destinations. There is no rail link to the airport. Coonagh airfield, a few kilometres west of Caherdavin, serves small private aircraft. Kerry and Cork Airports are around 1 hour 30 minutes and 2 hours drive away, respectively. Kerry Airport is connected via Farranfore railway station from Limerick railway station, and Irish Citylink provide a direct service to Cork Airport.

=== Bus ===
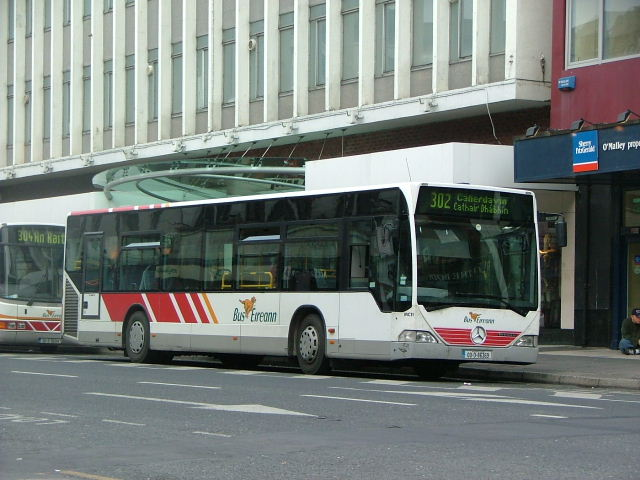
City Centre bus service

Local public transport is provided by several companies. Bus Éireann, Ireland's state-owned bus company, operates a number of services subsidised by the National Transport Authority, while a number of provide operators also run commercial bus services in and around Limerick. An updated city bus network was introduced in Limerick City in December 2016, which introduced new routes. In May 2019, Bus Éireann further changed and improved the Limerick City timetable, including increased frequency and later operating times.

Other rural buses run to towns and villages in the county and to Shannon Airport. There are also a number of Intercity and international buses from Bus Éireann's bus terminal adjoining Limerick Colbert railway station. These include hourly services to Dublin, Cork, Ennis and Galway. Expressway runs the 343 bus from Limerick Colbert Station to Shannon Airport. Bus Éireann also run a Limerick to Galway Express service travelling on the M18 in addition to the regular service. Other buses run every 2 hours to Tralee and Killarney. There are also regular daily services to Waterford and Athlone, and a daily service to London via the ferry from Rosslare Europort.

There are some private bus companies in operation providing city and intercity services. Dublin Coach provides the M7 express service which operates every hour from Arthur's Quay which goes to Dublin or Ennis. JJ Kavanagh also provide Dublin to Limerick services from Arthur's Quay. Citylink runs a number of services from Limerick to Galway, Cork and Cork Airport and operate from Henry Street.

The ongoing BusConnects public transport infrastructure programme aims to improve bus transport across Limerick city and county as part of the Limerick Shannon Metropolitan Area Transport Strategy (LSMATS). The improvements will include a redesigned network providing a more efficient, higher-capacity system, with high-frequency routes. As of September 2026, BusConnects state that the rollout will take place on a phased basis. The bus fleet in Limerick has already been fully electrified as part of the changes, with charging infrastructure currently in place at Roxboro bus depot.

=== Rail ===
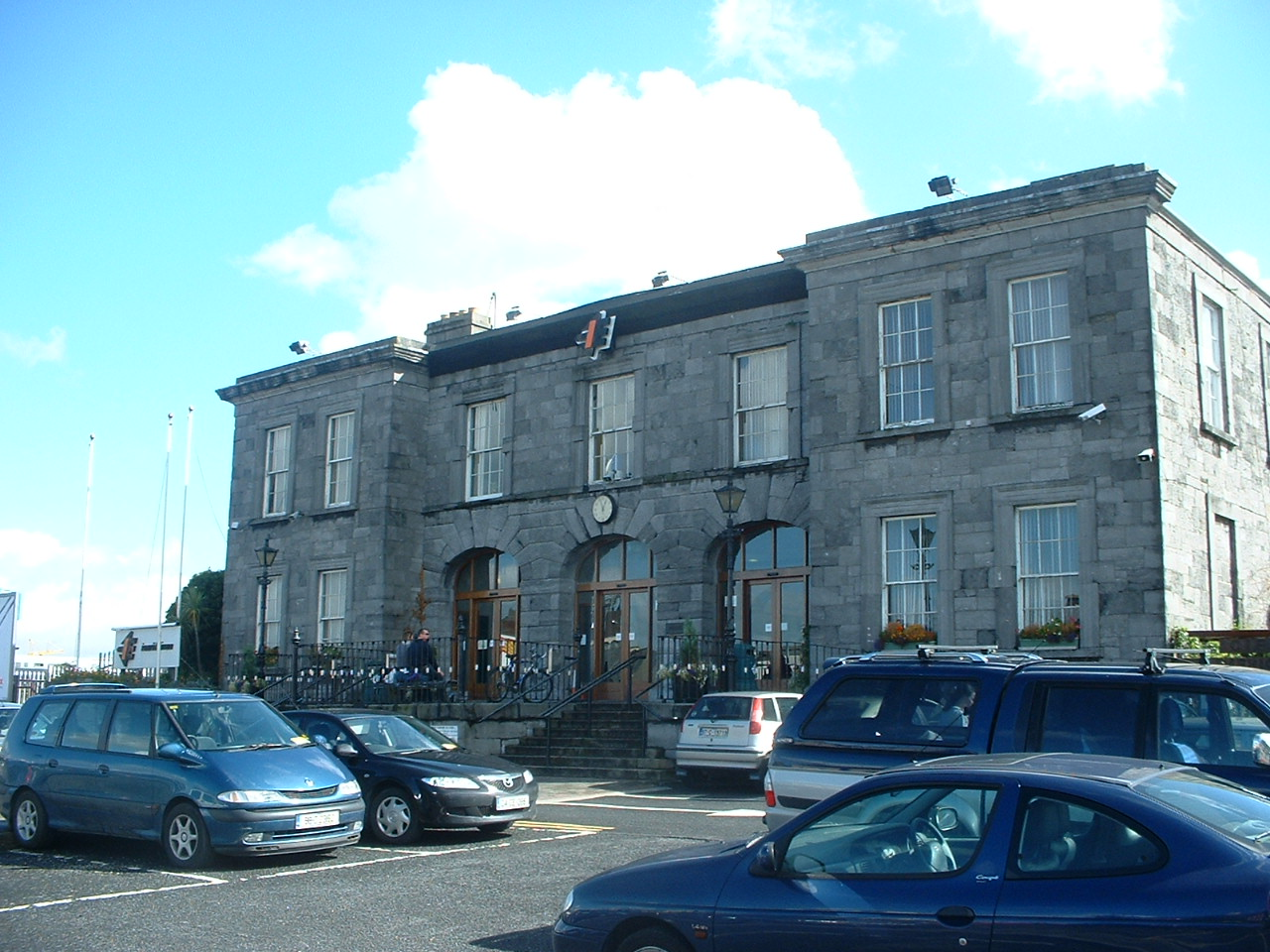
Colbert station, Parnell Street

Iarnród Éireann's Limerick Colbert station is the railway hub for the city and the Mid-West Region with a number of intercity and commuter rail services. Limerick railway station opened on 28 August 1858, replacing an earlier temporary station a short distance away, which had operated from 9 May 1848.

The following inter city routes are available from Limerick Colbert station :

- Limerick to Dublin Heuston: 16 services daily including 4 direct services. All remaining Dublin – Limerick services require passengers to change to the Dublin to Cork train at either Limerick Junction or at Ballybrophy railway station.
- Limerick to Waterford: 2 services daily (but none on Sundays). Passengers must change train at Limerick Junction to continue to Waterford with stations at Tipperary, Cahir, Clonmel and Carrick-on-Suir.
- Limerick to Galway: 5 services daily. This service reopened on 29 March 2010.
- Limerick to Cork: Passengers can travel between Limerick and Cork via Limerick Junction. There is no direct service.
- Limerick to Killarney, Farranfore and Tralee: Passengers can travel between Limerick and Killarney, Farranfore and Tralee via Limerick Junction where trains run via Mallow to reach County Kerry.

There are 3 suburban/commuter services in the Limerick Suburban Rail network:

- Limerick – Ennis calling at Sixmilebridge
- Limerick – Nenagh calling at Castleconnell and Birdhill (with some services continuing to Cloughjordan & Roscrea & connecting to the Dublin-Cork railway line at Ballybrophy.) Due to speed restrictions, this alternative Dublin – Limerick route can take 60 minutes longer (with a change at Ballybrophy) than by Limerick Junction albeit a more direct service.
- Limerick – Limerick Junction and Thurles

There are also some disused railway lines including the Limerick to Foynes line which closed to freight in the early 2000s, having lost passenger services in the early 1960s, although the track is still in situ. This is the last remaining part of the North Kerry Line which closed to passenger traffic in the early 1960s and to freight traffic (other than Limerick – Foynes) in the mid-1970s. In 2022, Iarnród Éireann commenced works to reopen the former Limerick–Foynes line for freight traffic. As of 2024, these works were projected to be completed by 2025, with freight operations due to commence from early 2026.

While there were some proposals to construct a suburban rail system in Limerick, similar to that of the DART in Dublin, these were never progressed.

=== Road ===
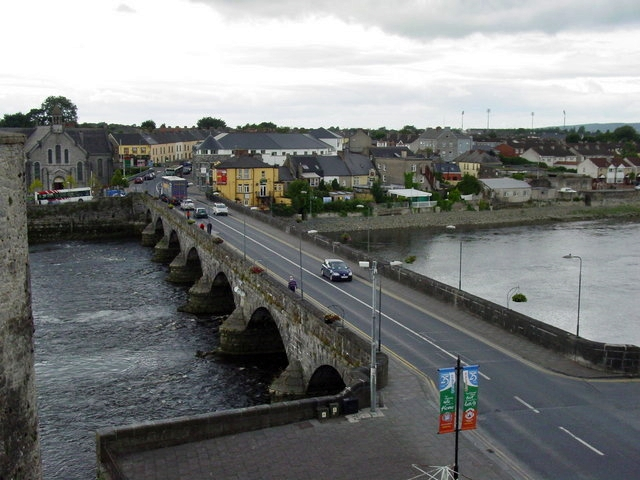
Thomond Bridge over the River Shannon

Limerick's central location in the midwest of Ireland means many national primary routes converge on the city. The M7 (Dublin), N/M18 (Galway, Ennis, Shannon), N/M20 (Cork), N21 (Tralee) and N24 (Waterford) routes all start/terminate in or near the city. Road infrastructure is further supplemented by the southern ring road and Limerick Tunnel bypass of the city and the M20 bypass of Dooradoyle and Raheen to the south of the city. Connections to the other cities were improved with the completion of the M7 motorway in December 2010, and continuing upgrades ongoing to the N/M18 to Shannon, Ennis, Galway, and Tuam – the final section opened in September 2017. A motorway is also planned between Cork and Limerick, with a proposed completion date in the mid-2020s.

=== Waterway transport ===
Historically, waterway transport has been key to Limerick's development. Vikings established the city as a maritime trading port. The city's position on a major Irish river system, the Shannon, enabled transport to the midlands of Ireland and further north and west. By the 18th century with the opening of canal systems throughout Ireland, Limerick Port established itself as Ireland's premier commercial port on the western side of the country. This was enabled by the ease of access facilitated by the opening of canals but most importantly to the River Shannon. The opening of the Grand Canal in the 18th century provided further access to Dublin and the east of the country. There are also a number of disused canals in the vicinity of the city including the Park Canal & the Plassey-Errina Canal on the old Limerick navigation. Waterway transport on the Shannon was regularly used to transport goods from Limerick to Dublin and vice versa however this mode of transport fell into decline in the 20th century. Originally Limerick port was located near the confluence of the Abbey and Shannon rivers at King's Island. Today the Shannon Foynes Port is located further downstream on the Shannon alongside the Dock Road. This general-purpose facility port is operated by the Shannon Foynes Port Company which operates all marine activities in the Shannon estuary.

=== Cycling ===
In recent years, Limerick City and County Council have been constructing a network of segregated cycle paths and other active travel infrastructure around the city. As of August 2026, the network is still in its early stages however some routes in the city have improved cycling infrastructure and there was a rise in cycling in the city (or 40%) in 2025.

== Education ==
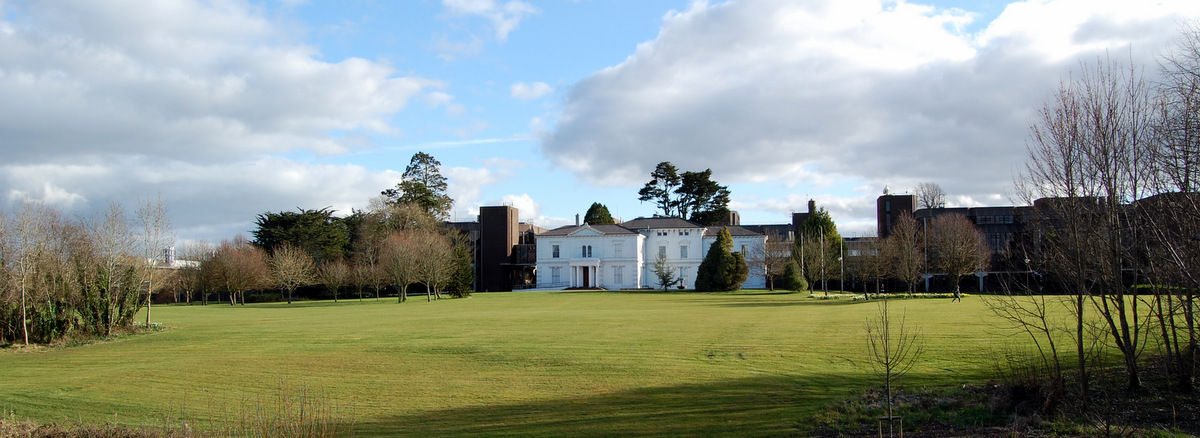
Plassey House at the University of Limerick.

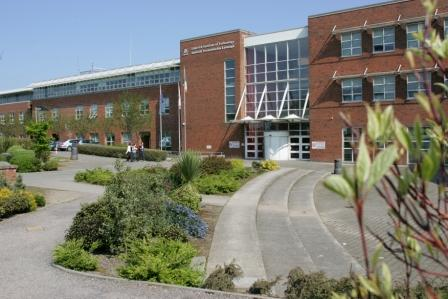
Limerick Institute of Technology

Limerick is a centre of higher education in the region, and technical and continuation education within the city traces its beginning back to the formation of the Limerick Athenaeum Society in 1852, marking the foundation of the Limerick Institute of Technology. The Society's aims included "the promotion of Literature, Science, Art and Music". Limerick is now home to a number of higher-education institutions including the University of Limerick, Limerick Institute of Technology (one of the two constituent campuses of the Technological University of the Shannon: Midlands Midwest) and Mary Immaculate College and has a student population of over 20,000.

The University of Limerick (UL) has a student population of over 17,000 and is about 5 km east of the city centre, in the suburb of Castletroy. It was established as the National Institute for Higher Education (NIHE) in 1972, and in 1989 was the first university to be established since the foundation of the state in 1922. Its academic programs include courses in engineering, information technology, materials science, sports science, humanities, teacher education, social sciences and music. In 2007, the university opened a medical school. The Irish World Music Centre specialises in traditional music and dance, and UL is host to the Irish Chamber Orchestra. The campus includes a 50m Olympic-standard swimming complex, the first to be established in Ireland. The campus has one of the longest footbridges in Europe, "The Living Bridge". Thomond College of Education, Limerick was a teacher training college for secondary level and was integrated into the university in 1991.

Limerick Institute of Technology (LIT) has a student population of approximately 7,000 and is a centre for undergraduate and postgraduate education in business, engineering, information technology, humanities, science, and art education. In October 2021, it merged with Athlone IT to become the Technological University of the Shannon: Midlands Midwest, in 2021/2022. The main campus is located at Moylish Park, about 3 kilometres north-west of the city centre, and the Limerick School of Art and Design is located on campuses at Clare Street and George's Quay. Additional facilities and outreach centres are located at O'Connell Street and in Ennis, County Clare and LIT has two campuses in County Tipperary, LIT Thurles and LIT Clonmel. These were formerly the campuses of the Tipperary Institute which merged with LIT in 2011. LIT was originally established in 1852 as a School of Ornamental Art. In the mid-1970s it was incorporated as the Limerick College of Art, Commerce & Technology (CoACT) and achieved the designation of a Regional Technical College (RTC) in 1993 and finally an Institute of Technology in 1997. LIT has connections with several enterprise centres.

Mary Immaculate College is an education and arts college located just southwest of the city centre. The main focus is on the education of primary-level teachers. Mary Immaculate College is a constituent college of the University of Limerick.

Griffith College Limerick (GCL) is a private college in Limerick. The college was established in 2006 when the Mid-West Business Institute was acquired by Griffith College. The college runs full-time and part-time courses in accountancy, business, law, engineering, computing, and IT.

Primary and secondary education in the city is organised similarly to the rest of Ireland. The Limerick and Clare Education and Training Board (formerly the City of Limerick Vocational Education Committee) provides education services for over 25,000 learners in the city at secondary and further education levels. Secondary level schools in Limerick include Castletroy College, Crescent College Comprehensive, Thomond Community College, Villiers, Educate Together, and the all-Irish language Gaelcholáiste Luimnigh, which are all co-educational. Ardscoil Rís, St. Clements Redemptorist College, CBS Sexton Street and St Munchin's College are boys-only schools, and Laurel Hill Coláiste, Laurel Hill Secondary School, Coláiste Nano Nagle and Ardscoil Mhuire are girls-only schools.

== Sport ==
Rugby, Gaelic football, hurling, and association football are popular sporting pastimes in Limerick. The city and suburbs also have many tennis, athletics, cricket and golf clubs. The city is host to many large sporting events. Examples in the 21st century include the 2008 and 2009 Irish Open golf championships, the 2010 Irish Special Olympics, the All-Ireland Corporate Games, and the World Baton twirling Championships. Limerick was designated as a European City of Sport for 2011 by the European Capitals of Sport Association (ACES). The National Elite Swimming Club is based at The University of Limerick Arena. Former World Boxing Champion, Andy Lee, who held the WBO middleweight title from 2014 to 2015, trained at St. Francis Boxing Club on Mungret Street.

=== Association football ===
Association football is popular in the city and suburbs, and the city was historically represented in the League of Ireland by Limerick FC. The club first joined the league in 1937. There have been a number of variations of the club, and their most successful period was from the 1960s to the 1980s when they won two League of Ireland championships and two FAI Cups. The club played at Markets Field until the mid-1980s when they controversially moved to a new venue. Limerick FC returned to the Markets Field in June 2015, following the purchase of the venue by the Limerick Enterprise Development Partnership (LEDP) from Bord na gCon. However, the club suffered a financial collapse in 2019 and lost its licence to play in the senior national league.

In place of Limerick FC, a new club called Treaty United F.C. was created. The women's team, Treaty United W.F.C., began playing in the 2020 season of the Women's National League. The men's team was not able to begin playing until the 2021 season, joining the League of Ireland First Division. In 2026, Treaty United reached an agreement with Limerick FC to purchase the latter's name and intellectual property, adopting the name for the 2027 season onwards.

Junior soccer in the city is played within the Limerick and District League. Fairview Rangers have won the FAI Junior Cup a record ten times, with Pike Rovers and Caledonians each winning the trophy once.

=== Basketball ===
Similar to the rest of Ireland, basketball was a popular sport in Limerick during the 1970s and 1980s, with up to four divisions in the men's and women's local leagues. It suffered a decline during the 1990s culminating in the complete demise of local league basketball in the city and surrounding areas. The main clubs in the city were St. Colm's and Marathon with St. Colm's, in particular, having a long history in the National Leagues. Limerick is currently represented in national competitions by Limerick Eagles and Limerick Celtics in the men's Super League, Limerick Celtics in the women's Super League, and Limerick Sport Huskies in the women's second tier. The Eagles and Huskies both play their home games at the 2,500-capacity University Arena at the University of Limerick in Castleteoy, while Celtics play at Crescent College in Dooradoyle. There are several other teams at the school and club level, including St. Colm's, Limerick Lakers, Limerick Lions and Taste of Europe.

=== Cricket ===
Limerick Cricket Club and Limerick Blasters are members of the Munster Cricket Union, the former based at Adare and the latter at Ballyneety. A dedicated cricket pitch exists at Mungret Park, and an annual schools competition is played in the city. Limerick Cricket Club has in the past provided players for the Ireland national cricket team.

=== Gaelic games ===
Limerick jersey with Sporting Limerick Logo

Ireland's national sports of hurling and Gaelic football are widely played in the city and its surrounding suburbs. The Limerick county hurling team have won the All-Ireland Senior Hurling Championship five times since 2018 and 13 overall, the sport's fourth most successful county. In 2026, Limerick won the All-Ireland senior and minor championships, the National Hurling League, the Munster championship and the Munster league.

Na Piarsaigh, Monaleen and Mungret/St Paul's are city clubs currently playing hurling at senior level. Claughaun (Clochán) compete at intermediate level and Old Christians (Sean-Chríostaithe), Milford (Áth an Mhuilinn), St Patrick's (Naomh Pádraig) and Abbey Sarsfields (Sáirséalaigh na Mainistreach) compete at junior level.

Limerick won the first All-Ireland Senior Football Championship in 1887 when represented by the city's Commercials club and repeated the feat in 1896. Since then, the game has lived mostly in the shadow of hurling but a resurgence in 2000 saw the county win its first Munster Under-21 title and has since reached three Munster Senior Football Championship finals. Monaleen (Móin a'Lín) is the only city club to play football in the senior grade. Saint Patrick's (Naomh Pádraig), Claughaun (An Clochán), Mungret St. Paul's (Mungairit Naomh Pól) and Na Piarsaigh are at intermediate level and Milford (Áth a Mhuilinn), Abbey Sarsfields (Sáirséalaigh na Mainstreach) and Ballinacurra Gaels (Gaeil Bhaile na Cora) play at junior level.

Some secondary school's compete in the Dr. Harty Cup, which is the Munster Colleges Hurling Championship. Limerick CBS has won the cup on 10 occasions, including four in a row from 1964 to 1967 and most recently in 1993. The school also won the Dr. Croke Cup, the All-Ireland Colleges Hurling Championship, on two occasions, in 1964 and 1966. Ardscoil Rís has won the championship on five occasions, in 2010, 2011, 2013, 2015, and 2021 and St. Munchin's College won it once, in 1922.

Both the University of Limerick (UL) and Limerick Institute of Technology (LIT) have been successful in the Fitzgibbon Cup, the All-Ireland Higher Education Hurling Championship. UL first won the championship in 1989 and has won it four times in all. LIT's two wins came in 2005 and 2007. Both of the colleges met in the final in 2011, with UL scoring an injury-time goal to win.

Limerick's Gaelic Grounds (Páirc na nGael), on the Ennis Road, is the county team's home venue for both sports and has a capacity of 49,000 following reconstruction in 2004. In 1961 it hosted Ireland's biggest crowd for a sporting event outside Croke Park when over 61,000 paid to see the Munster hurling final between Tipperary and Cork.

=== Golf ===
There are three golf clubs associated with Limerick city. Limerick Golf Club was founded in 1891 and is located at Ballyclough, 5 kilometres (3 mi) due south of the city centre. Castletroy Golf Club was founded in 1937 and is located in the suburb of Castletroy in the southwest of the city. Rathbane Golf Club is based at Rathbane Golf Course, a municipal facility opened in 1998 on the southern outskirts of the city and operated under a licence for Limerick City Council. Limerick has won the Irish Senior Cup, the blue riband event of Irish amateur golf, on four occasions and was the first Irish club to win the European Club Championship, in 1980. Castletroy has won the Irish Senior Cup once.

Limerick Golf Club was host to the J. P. McManus Pro-Am, one of the largest pro-am events of its kind in the world. It has contributed over €95m to local charities since its inception in 1990. The event moved to the larger Adare Golf Club in 2005 as it had outgrown the Ballyclough venue. Adare also played host to the Irish Open in 2007 and 2008.

=== Horse racing ===
Limerick Racecourse is located 10km outside the city at Greenmount, Patrickswell and holds flat and National Hunt meetings throughout the year.

The racecourse superseded Greenpark Racecourse, a course inside the city, which closed in 1999 after 130 years of racing.

=== Rowing ===
Four rowing clubs are located in the city, namely Limerick Boat Club, Shannon Rowing Club, St Michael's Rowing Club, and Athlunkard Boat Club. St Michael's member and Limerick native Sam Lynch won the World Rowing Championships gold medal in the Men's Lightweight Single Sculls in 2001 and 2002.

=== Rugby ===
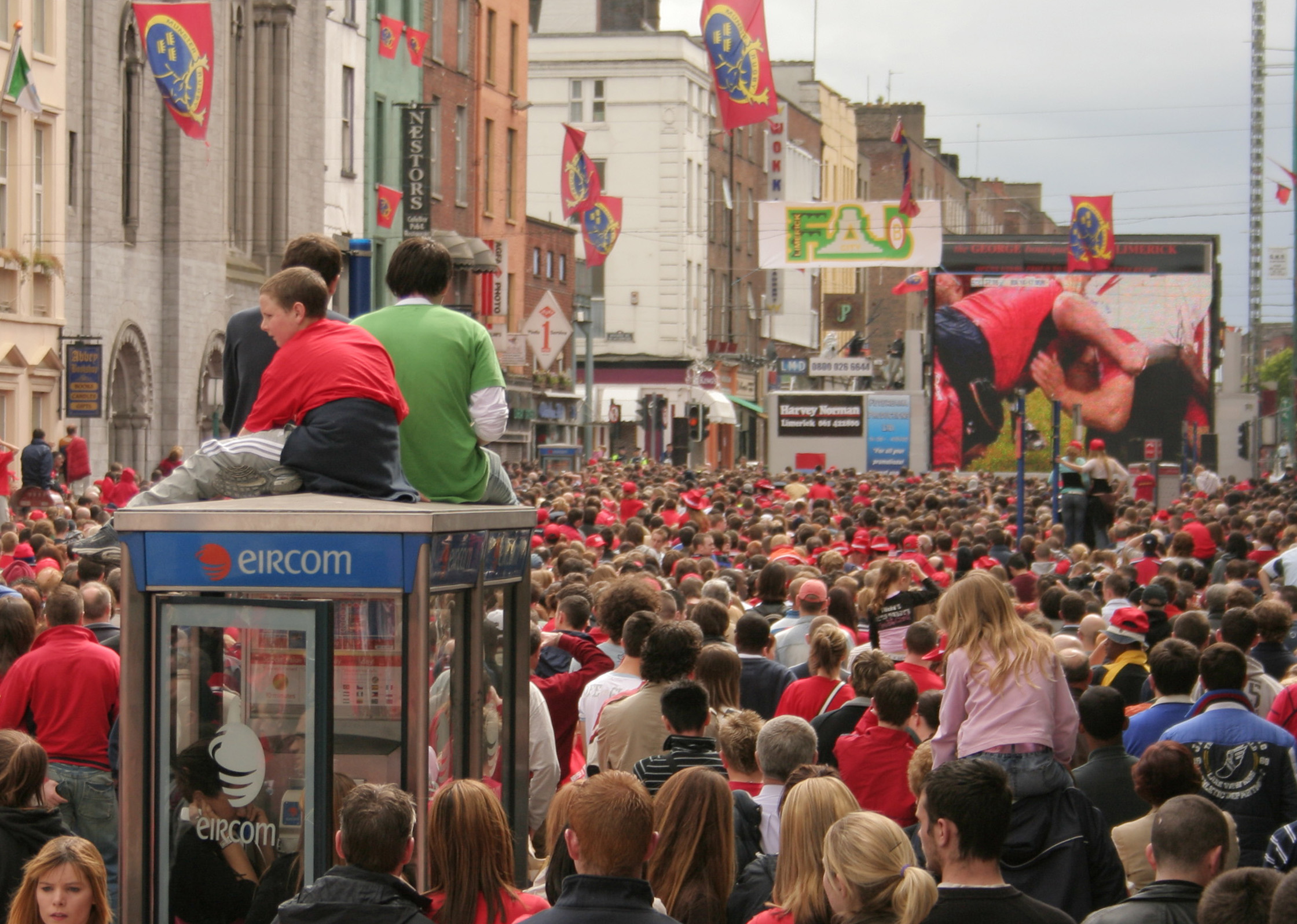
Munster fans in Limerick during the 2006 Heineken Cup

Rugby union is popular in the city and is widely played at all levels, with Limerick sometimes referred to as the "spiritual home of Irish rugby". Two-time European champions Munster play most home matches at Thomond Park, where they held a record of being unbeaten in the Heineken Cup for 26 consecutive games until the 16–9 defeat by Leicester in January 2007. Munster recorded a famous 12–0 victory against the New Zealand All Blacks in 1978 at Thomond Park and came close a second time when the teams met in 2008, losing 18–16. Munster also defeated an Australian touring side at Thomond Park in 2010 and the Maori All Blacks 27–14 in 2016.

The first two decades of the All-Ireland League from its inception in 1990 was dominated by Limerick city teams, with three clubs winning the competition 13 times between them: Shannon (9); Garryowen (3) and Young Munster (1). Other senior rugby clubs in the city include Old Crescent, Thomond, and UL Bohemians. Ardscoil Rís Old Boys, Presentation, Richmond and St. Mary's are city clubs playing in the junior leagues.

The city's secondary schools compete in the Munster Senior and Junior Cups and a number of schools have had notable success at both levels. The most successful rugby school in the city is Crescent College, eleven-time Senior Cup and five-time Junior Cup winners. The school is affiliated with Old Crescent RFC. St. Munchin's has won the Senior Cup five times since 1968 and the Junior Cup three times. Limerick CBS won the Senior Cup on four occasions in the 1920s and 1930s and the Junior Cup in 1932. Ardscoil Rís has won the Junior Cup twice, in 2003 and 2005 and Castletroy College won both senior and junior competitions in 2008.

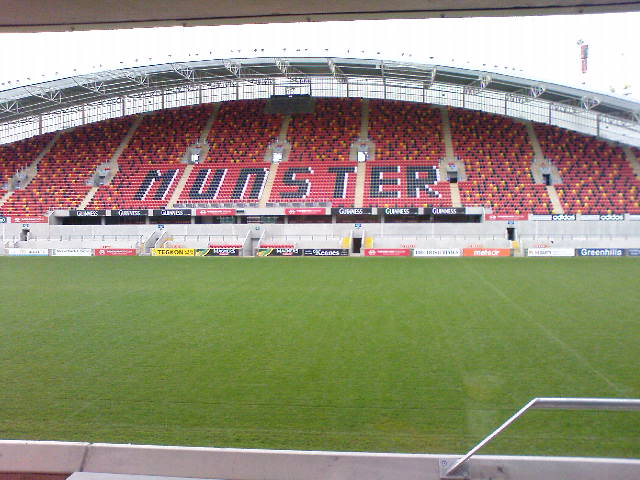
Thomond Park is the home grounds of Munster Rugby

=== Rugby league ===
Domestic rugby league was formerly played in Limerick, with the Treaty City Titans representing the city in the All-Ireland Rugby League Championship. The Titans were champions eight times between 2005 and 2015, but as of 2023 the team is defunct. An academy was briefly set up in 2011 to identify Irish players to play for Super League clubs.

In 2011, Ireland national rugby league team lost 16—34 to France men's national rugby league team at Thomond Park. In 2013, Ireland hosted Australia in the 2013 Rugby League World Cup, losing 50–0. Limerick pair James McCarthy and Maurice Noonan were capped for Ireland at the 2026 Wheelchair Rugby League World Cup in Wollongong, Australia.

== Twin towns – sister cities ==
Limerick is twinned with:

- A Coruña, Spain
- Austin, United States
- Limerick Township, United States
- Lowell, United States
- Quimper, France
- Santa Clara, United States
- Spokane, United States

== Photos ==
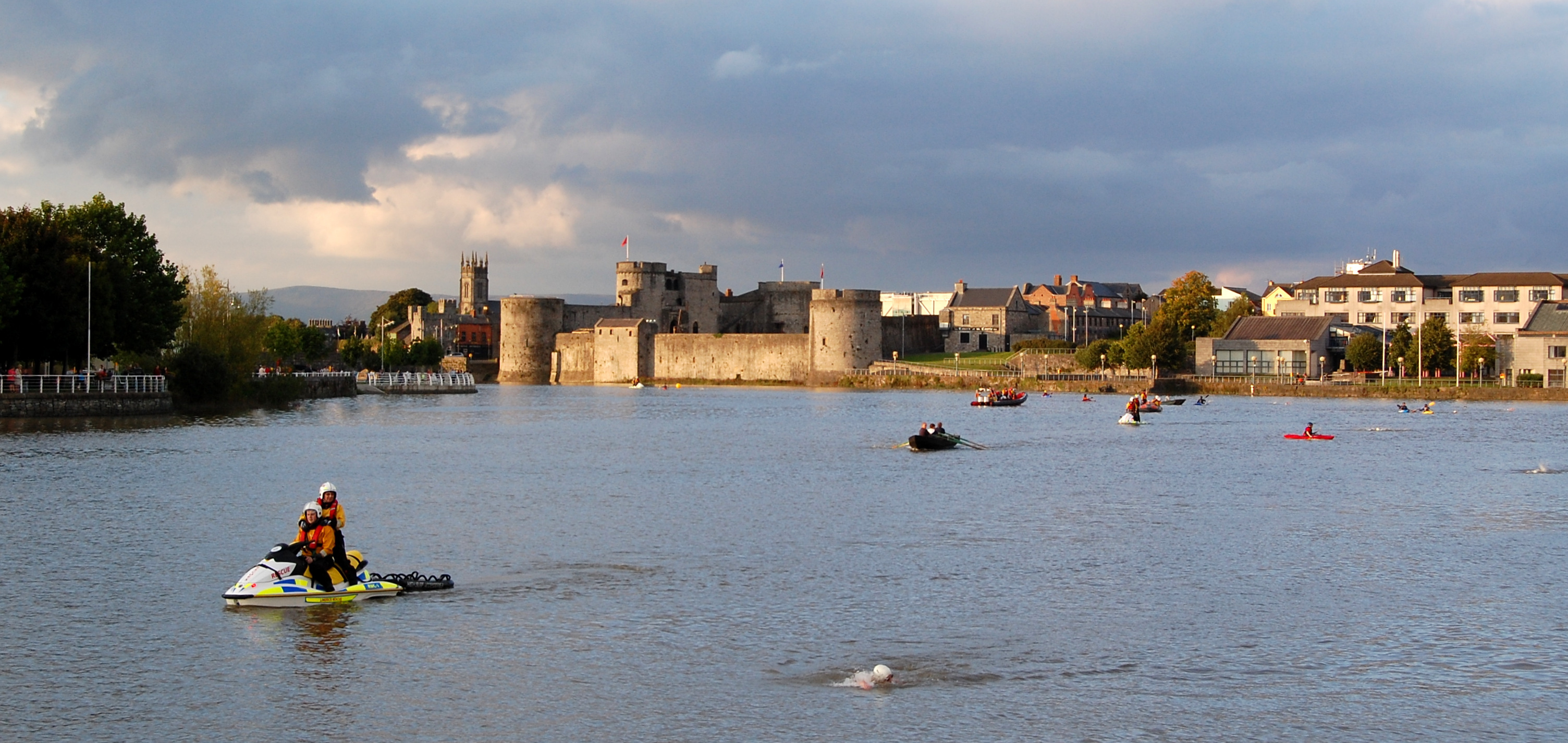
King John's Castle on the River Shannon

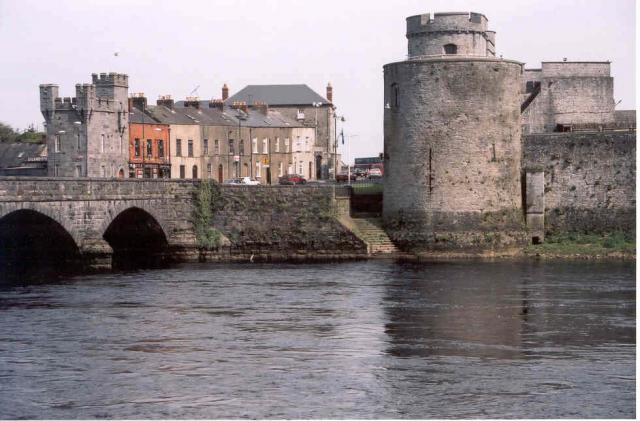
Thomond Bridge and King John's Castle

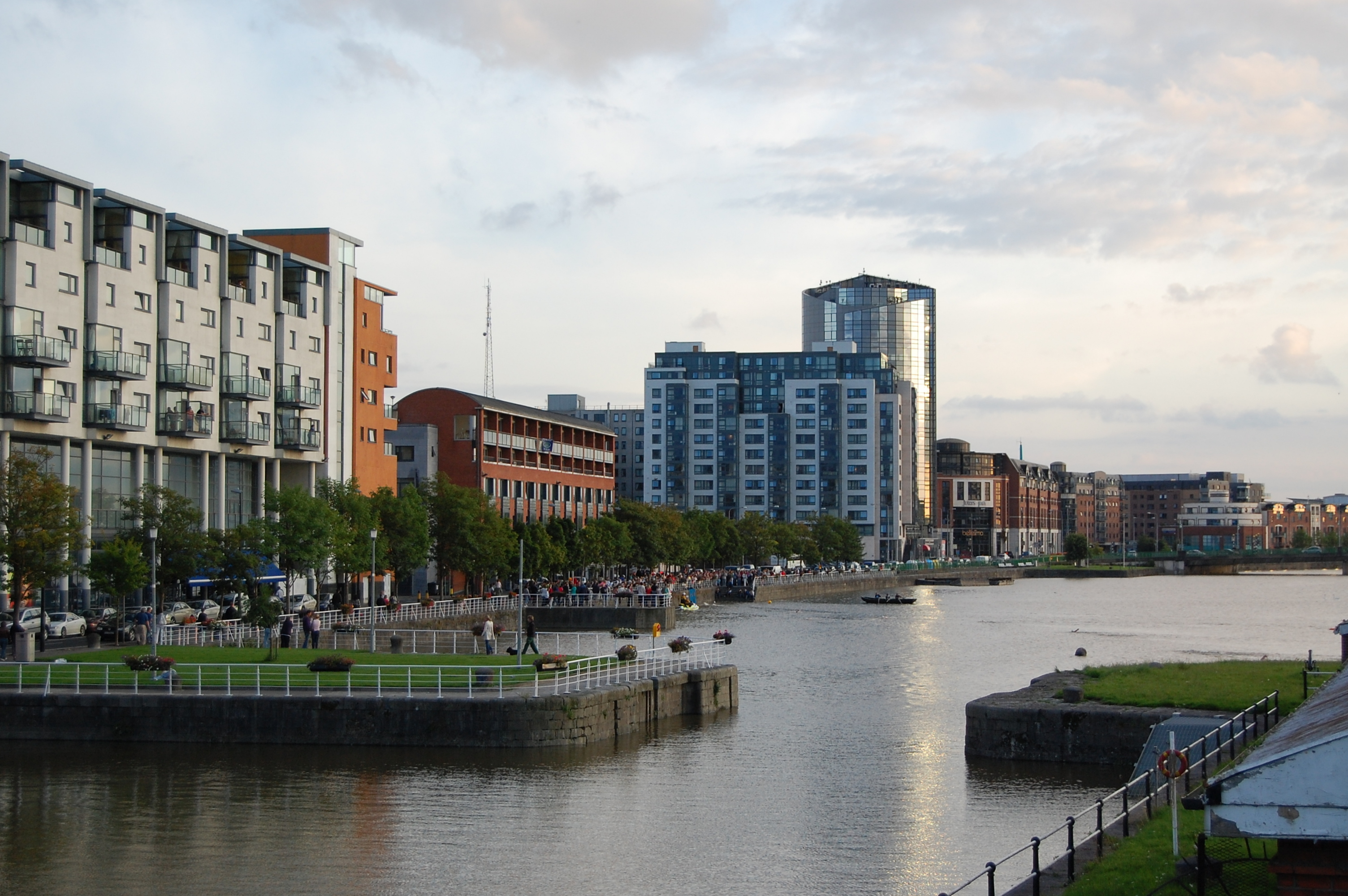
The quay in Limerick City

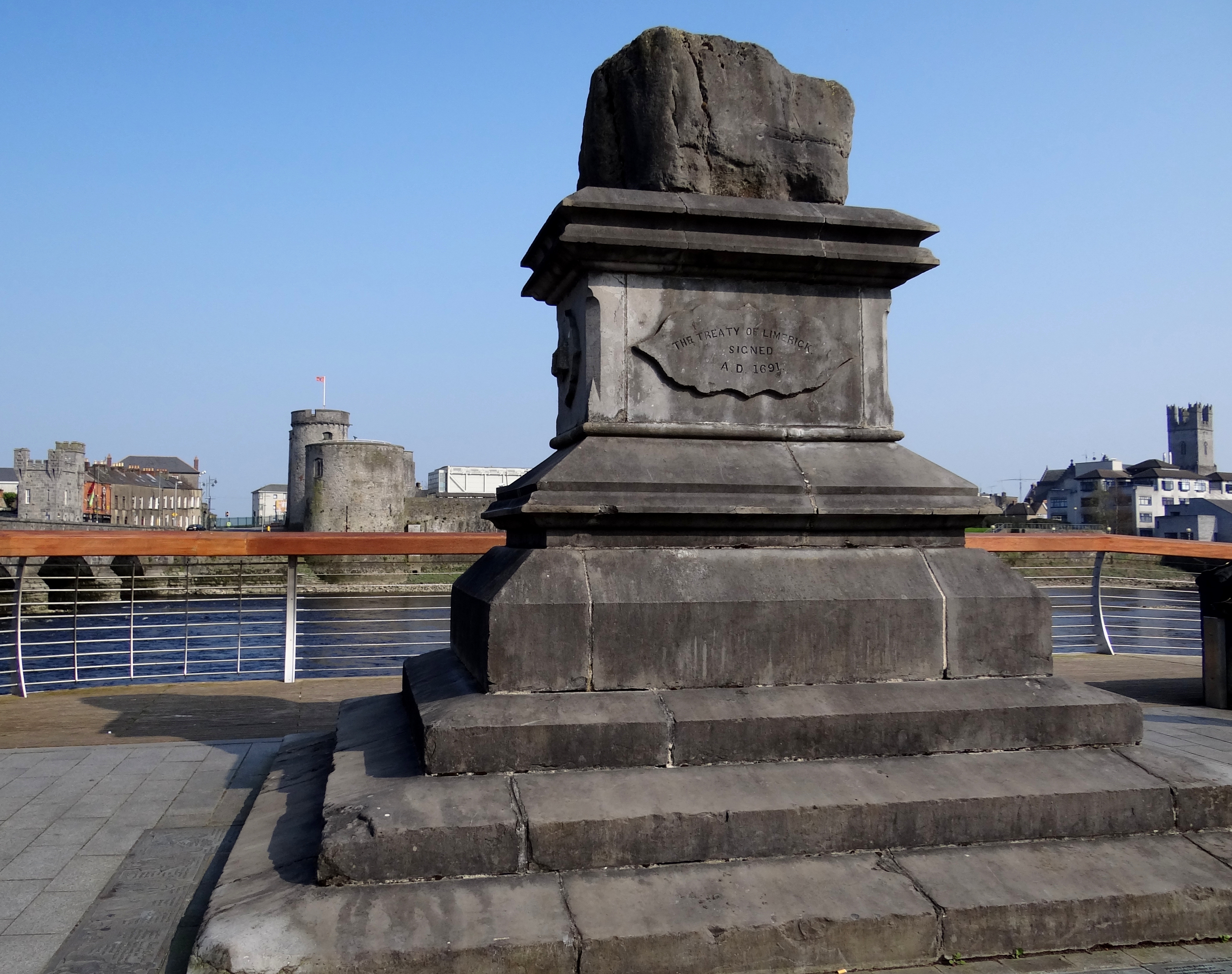
Treaty Stone on the banks of the River Shannon

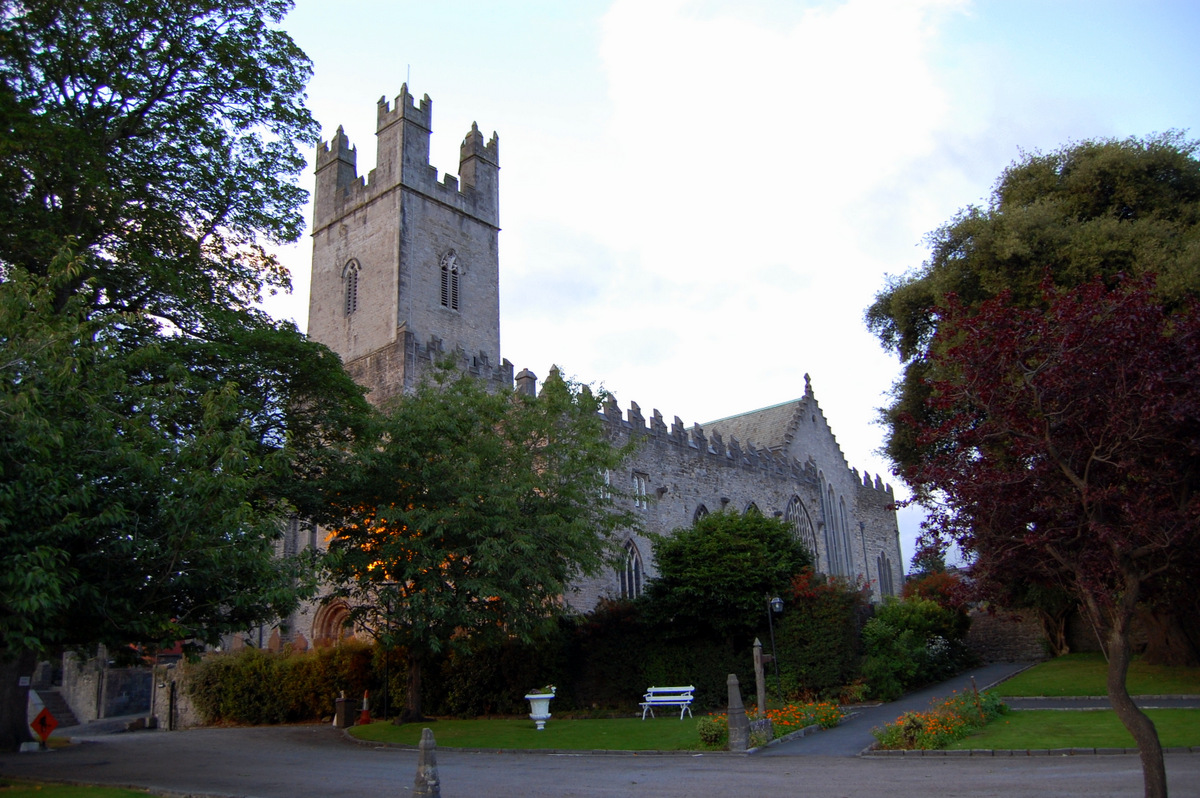
St. Mary's Cathedral

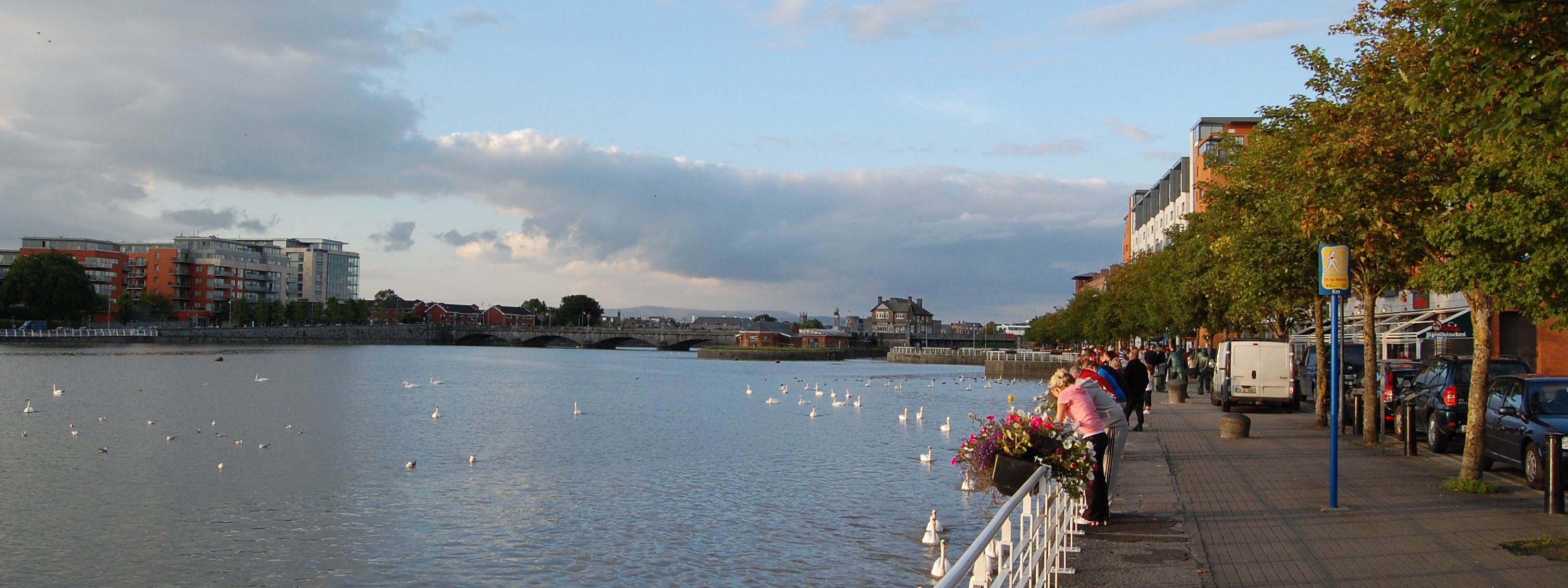
Limerick on the River Shannon as viewed from Bishop's Quay

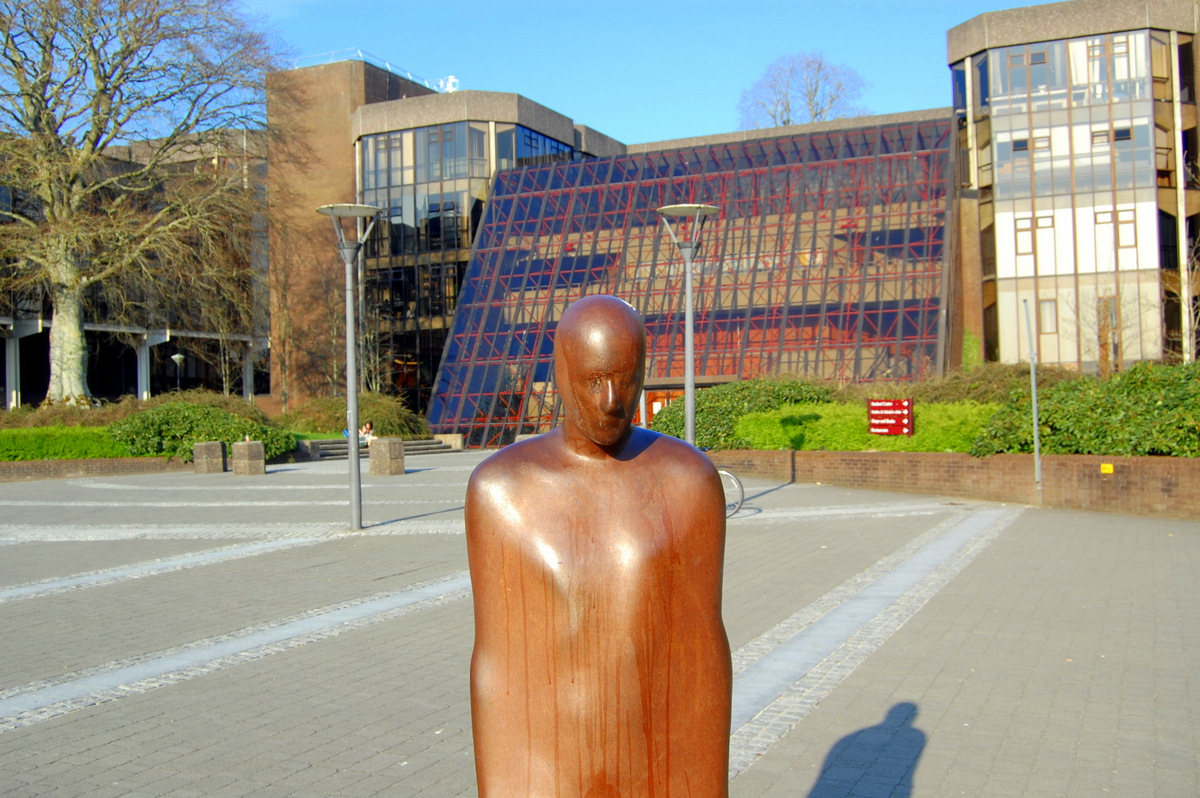
Sculpture by Antony Gormley in the Central Plaza of the University of Limerick

== See also ==
- List of towns and villages in the Republic of Ireland
- List of public art in Limerick
- William Henry Harvey FRS (1811–1866) botanist and phycologist from Limerick
