= Thomas Street, Limerick =

Thomas Street
- Interactive map of Thomas Street
- Native name: Sráid Thomáis (Irish)
- Namesake: Thomas Unthank
- Length: 300 m (980 ft)
- Width: 17 metres (56 ft)
- Location: Limerick, Ireland
- Postal code: V94
- Coordinates: 52.662391°N 8.625187°W
- northwest end: O'Connell Street, Bedford Row
- southeast end: Wickham Street

Other
- Known for: shops, restaurants

Thomas Street (Irish: Sráid Thomáis) is a street in central Limerick, Ireland. It is reputed to be named after Thomas Unthank a prominent 18th century Limerick merchant, however there is no definitive proof for this. The street begins at a junction off O'Connell Street and continues eastwards towards Wickham Street. At about midway there is a junction for Catherine Street.

Thomas Street has seen major improvement works and re-modelling in recent years. This included the pedestrianisation of the part of the street between O'Connell Street and Catherine Street and the widening of footpaths from Catherine Street to Wickham Street.

Shops on Thomas Street include Brown Thomas, Carl Scarpa and Sextons. The street is known as a centre of dining, and includes cafes and restaurants such as Coqbull, Cornstore, Bella Italia, Oahu, Caffé Nero and NOM Donuts, as well as a number of pubs.
