= Alexander William Shaw =

Sir Alexander William Shaw
- Born: 27 October 1847; County Limerick
- Died: 1923 (aged 75–76)
- Occupation: bacon manufacturer
- Known for: co-founder of Limerick Boat Club, founder of Limerick and Lahinch golf clubs

Sir Alexander William Shaw (27 October 1847 – 1923) was an Irish bacon manufacturer, one of the founding members of Limerick Boat Club and the founder of Limerick and Lahinch golf clubs.

He was born in County Limerick, the second son of John Shaw of Willowbank, bacon merchant. The family firm (W. J. Shaw and Sons, Musgrave Street) was already thriving when he took it over, but under his astute management it grew to become one of the largest bacon curing businesses in Europe, and Shaw became one of the most prominent businessmen in the city.

He was the President of the Limerick Chamber from 1899 to 1906, and became a patron of Garryowen FC in 1888.

== Golf ==
Shaw was a keen sportsman and took part in rowing, rugby, athletics and hurling, but golf became his main interest. During the course of his business trips he often travelled to Scotland, where he became a passionate fan of the game. In 1891 he chaired a meeting in Limerick to discuss forming a golf club for the county. Land at Ballinacurra was procured and Limerick Golf Club was formed with Shaw as first president and captain. The club was based at several different locations before it finally settled at Ballyclough in 1919. He was appointed first trustee of the club in 1909.

In 1892 Shaw "discovered" Lahinch and from then on devoted his spare time and energy to founding and promoting the Lahinch Golf Club. He was president of the club from 1892 to his death in 1923.

In 1894 he established the South of Ireland Championship, which is still played. He was elected Honorary Vice-president of the Golfing Union of Ireland in 1902.
