= 1968 Limerick East by-election =

By-election to the 18th Dáil

- 22 May 1968
- Turnout: 38,037 (81.3%)
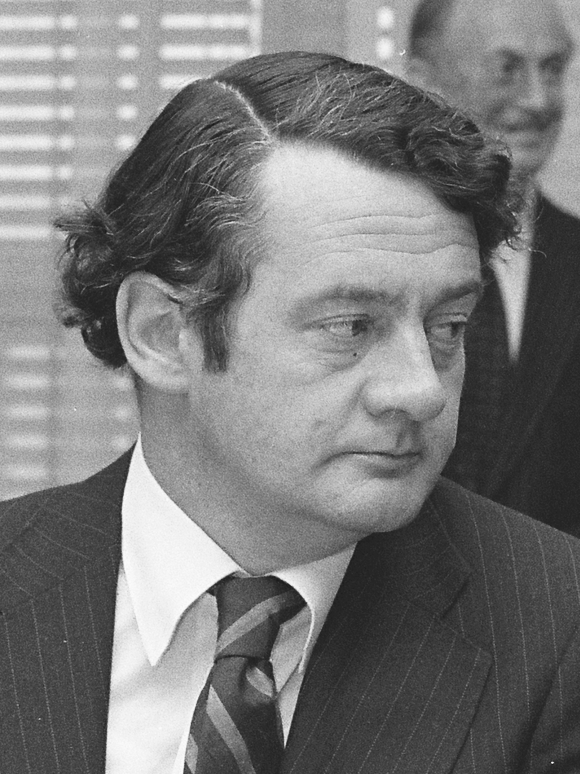
| | | Lipper | O'Higgins |
| Nominee | Desmond O'Malley | Michael Lipper | James F. O'Higgins |
| Party | Fianna Fáil | Labour | Fine Gael |
| First preferences | 16,638 | 10,151 | 10,039 |
| Percentage | 43.7% | 26.7% | 26.4% |
| Final count | 18,447 | 17,520 | – |
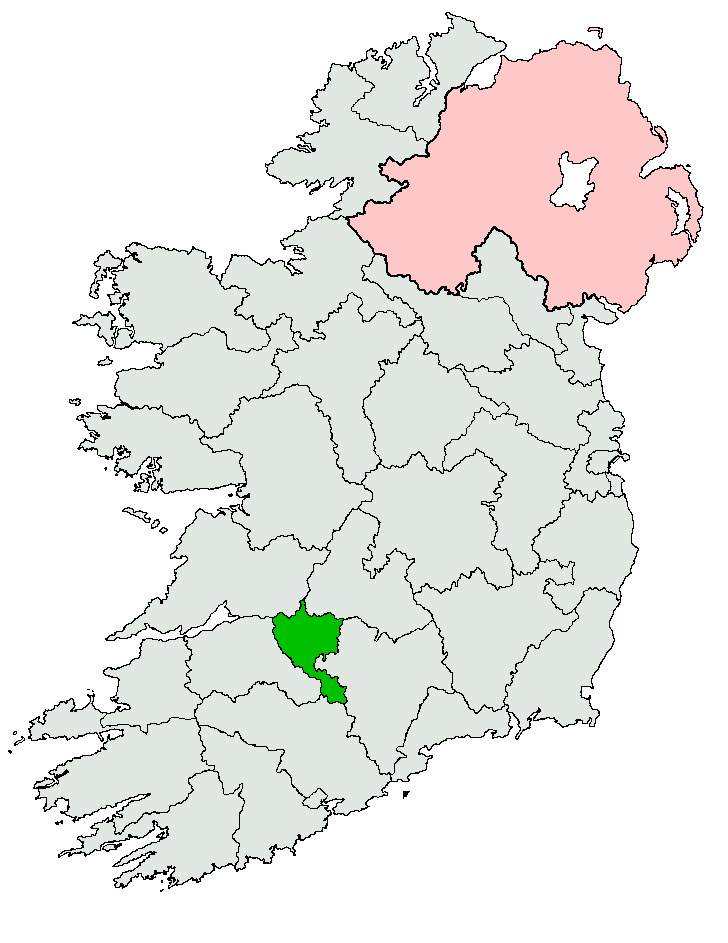
- Limerick East shown within Ireland
TD before election
Donogh O'Malley
Fianna Fáil
TD after election
Desmond O'Malley
Fianna Fáil

A Dáil by-election was held in the constituency of Limerick East in Ireland on Wednesday, 22 May 1968, to fill a vacancy in the 18th Dáil. It followed the death of Fianna Fáil Teachta Dála (TD) Donogh O'Malley on 10 March 1968.

The writ of election to fill the vacancy was agreed by the Dáil on 30 April 1968.

The by-election was won by the Fianna Fáil candidate Desmond O'Malley, nephew of the deceased TD, Donogh O'Malley.

== Result ==
1968 Limerick East by-election
| Party | Candidate | FPv% | Count | | |
| Party | Candidate | FPv% | 1 | 2 | 3 |
|---|---|---|---|---|---|
| Fianna Fáil | Desmond O'Malley | 43.7 | 16,638 | 16,828 | 18,447 |
| Labour | Michael Lipper | 26.7 | 10,151 | 10,760 | 17,520 |
| Fine Gael | James F. O'Higgins | 26.4 | 10,039 | 10,335 | |
| Liberal | Mick B. Crowe | 3.2 | 1,209 | | |
Electorate: 46,798 Valid: 38,037 Quota: 19,019 Turnout: 81.3%
