= 1998 Limerick East by-election =

By-election to the 28th Dáil

- 11 March 1998
- Turnout: 42,703 (54.7%)
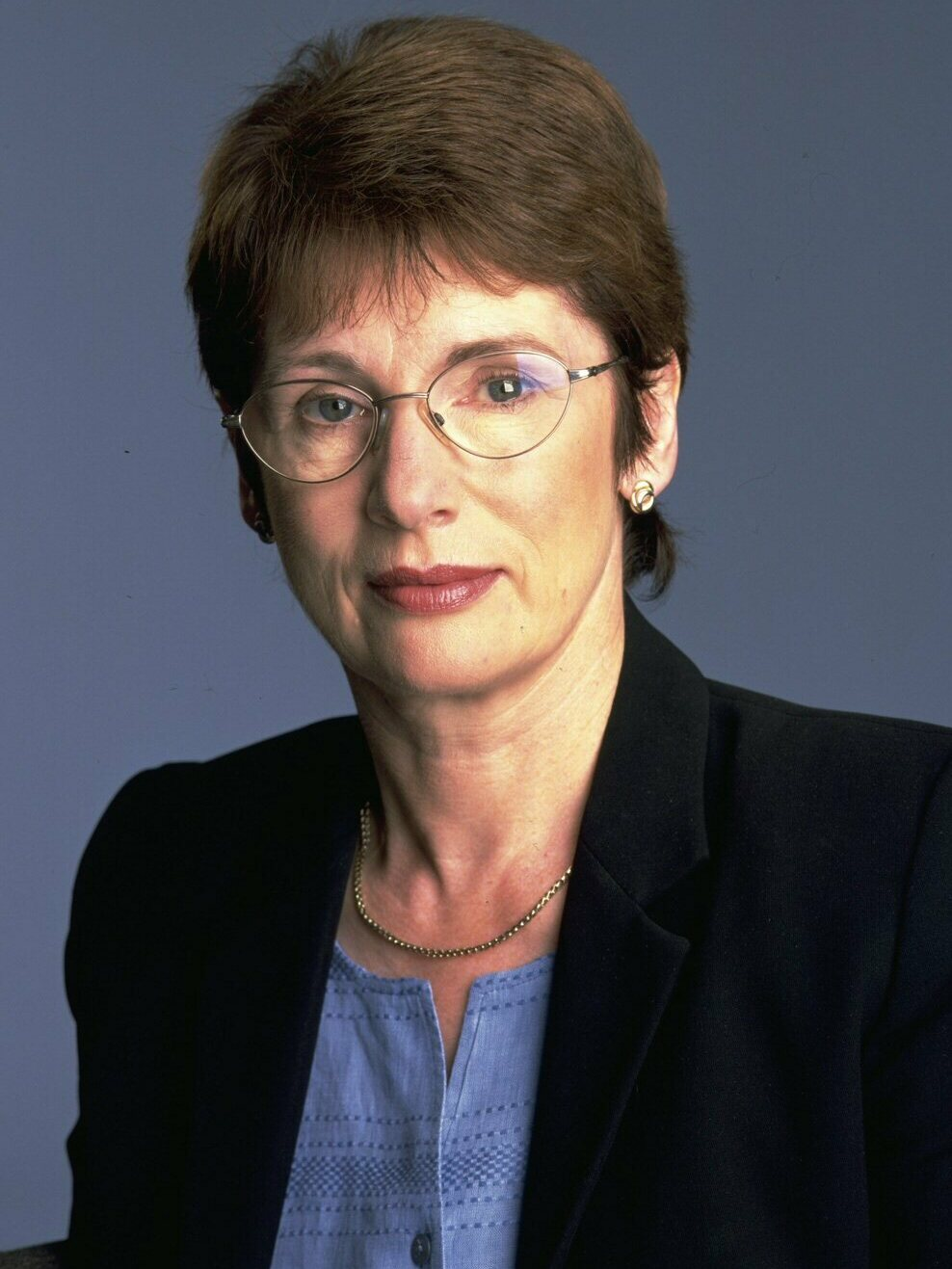
		Marsh	Jackman
Nominee	Jan O'Sullivan	Sandra Marsh	Mary Jackman
Party	Labour	Fianna Fáil	Fine Gael
First preferences	10,619	10,173	10,445
Percentage	24.9%	23.8%	24.5%
Final count	22,888	15,188	–
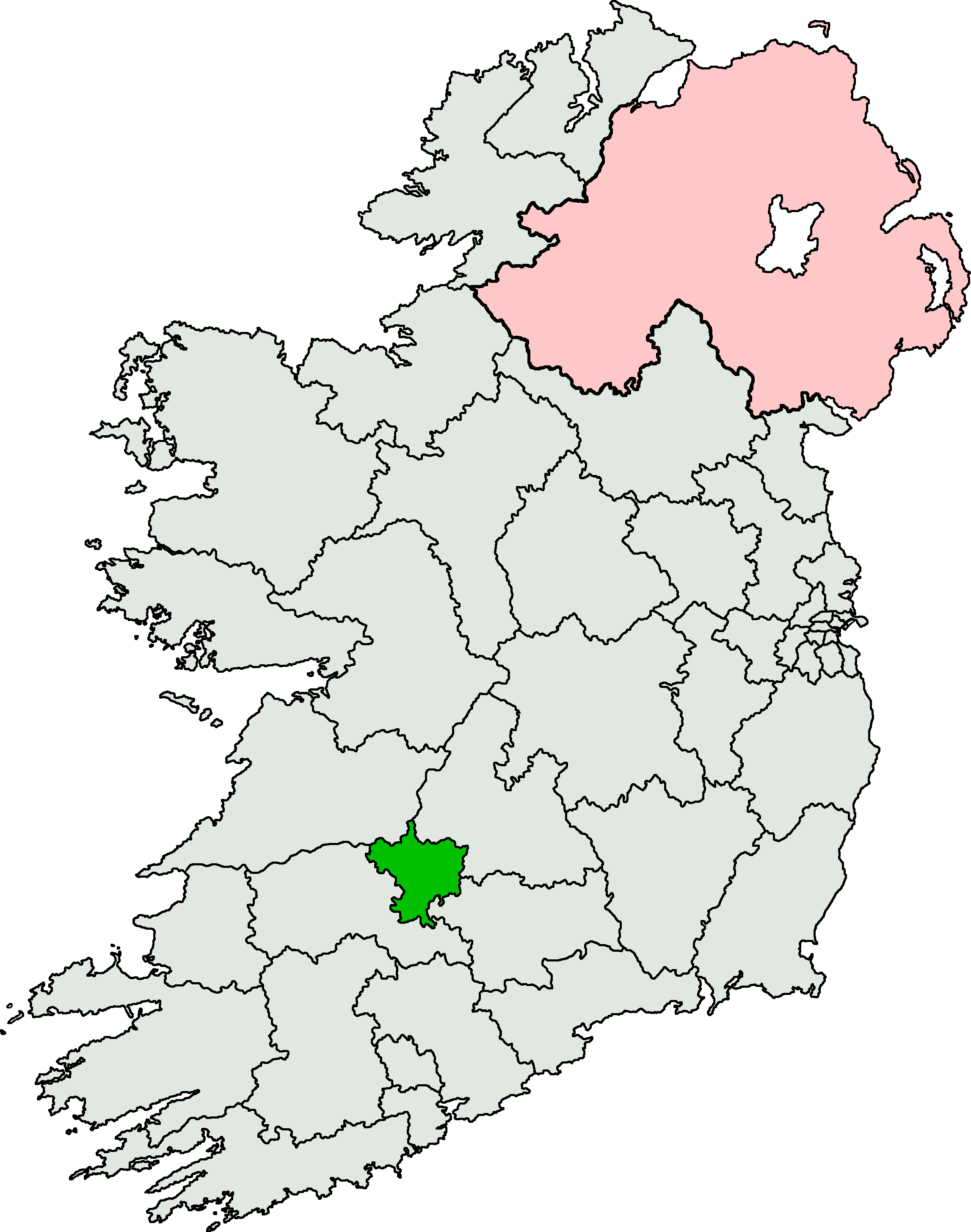
- Limerick East shown within Ireland
TD before election
Jim Kemmy
Labour
TD after election
Jan O'Sullivan
Labour

A Dáil by-election was held in the constituency of Limerick East in Ireland on Wednesday, 11 March 1998, to fill a vacancy in the 28th Dáil. It followed the death of Labour Party Teachta Dála (TD) Jim Kemmy on 25 September 1997.

The writ of election to fill the vacancy was agreed by the Dáil on 17 February 1998.

The by-election was won by the Labour candidate Jan O'Sullivan, a member of Limerick City Councill.

Among the candidates were Senator and Limerick County Councillor Mary Jackman, Limerick County Councillor Tim O'Malley, Limerick City Councillor John Ryan, Limerick City Councillor John Gilligan

On the same day, a by-election took place in Dublin North, both were the final occasions which Democratic Left contested by-elections. Both by-elections were won by Labour candidates.

== Result ==
1998 Limerick East by-election
Party	Candidate	FPv%	Count				
Party	Candidate	FPv%	1	2	3	4	5
Labour	Jan O'Sullivan	24.9	10,619	11,444	13,724	14,967	22,888
Fine Gael	Mary Jackman	24.5	10,445	10,870	11,591	12,860	
Fianna Fáil	Sandra Marsh	23.8	10,173	10,852	11,328	13,117	15,188
Progressive Democrats	Tim O'Malley	10.0	4,287	4,578	4,913		
Democratic Left	John Ryan	9.1	3,868	4,507			
Sinn Féin	Jenny Marie Shapland	2.1	909				
Independent	John Gilligan	2.0	850				
National Party	Nora Bennis	1.6	700				
Green	Eric Sheppard	1.3	546				
Independent	Barney Sheehan	0.5	198				
Independent	Noel Hannon	0.3	108				
Electorate: 78,062 Valid: 42,703 Quota: 21,352 Turnout: 54.7%
