= Jan O'Sullivan =

Irish former politician (born 1950)

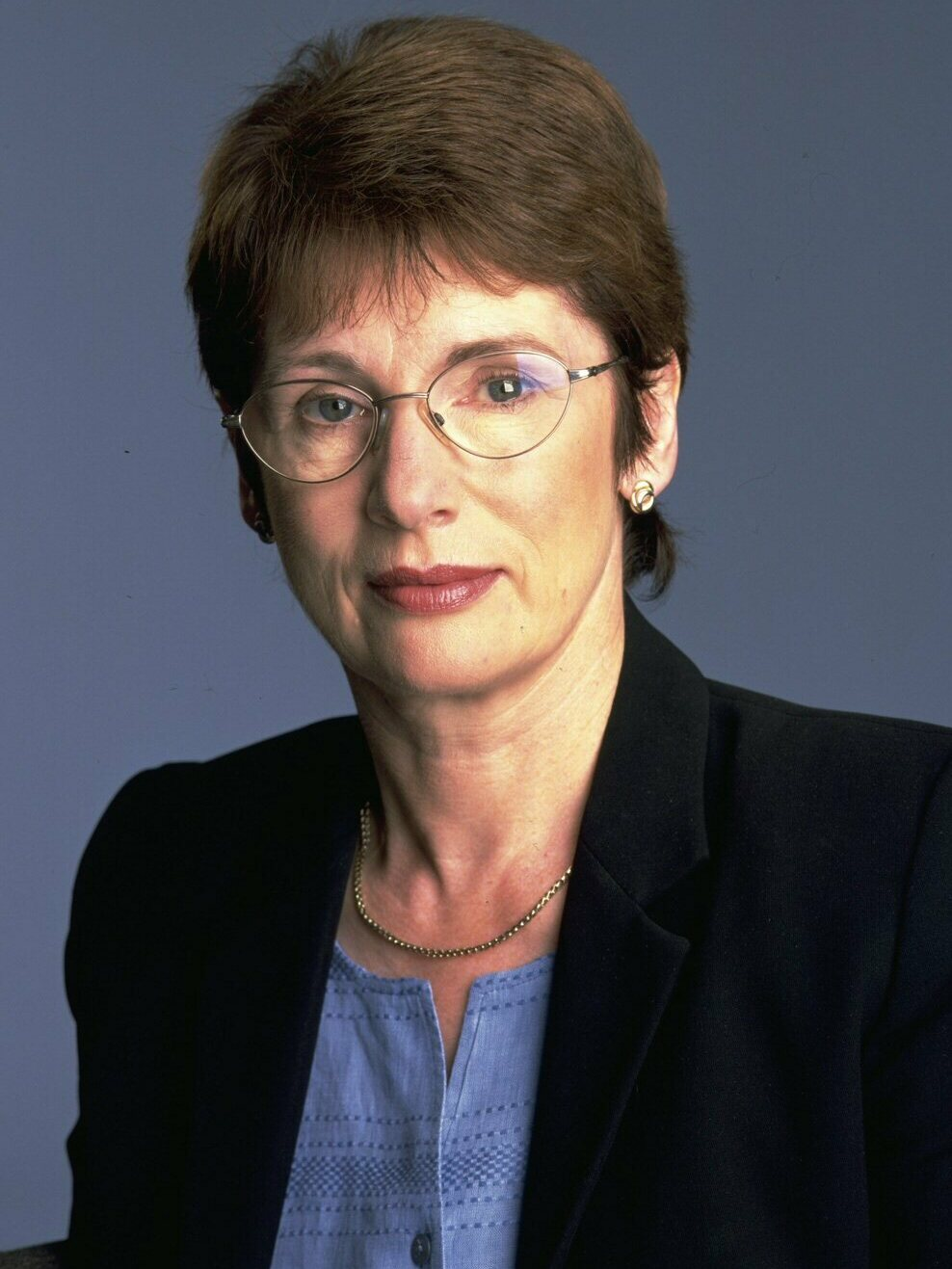
- O'Sullivan, c. 2002

Minister for Education and Skills
- In office 11 July 2014 – 6 May 2016
- Taoiseach: Enda Kenny
- Preceded by: Ruairi Quinn
- Succeeded by: Richard Bruton

Minister of State
- 2011–2014: Environment, Community and Local Government
- 2011: Foreign Affairs and Trade

Teachta Dála
- In office February 2011 – February 2020
- Constituency: Limerick City
- In office March 1998 – February 2011
- Constituency: Limerick East

Senator
- In office 17 February 1993 – 17 September 1997
- Constituency: Administrative Panel

Personal details
- Born: Janice Gale; 6 December 1950 (age 75) Clonlara, County Clare, Ireland
- Party: Labour Party (since 1990)
- Other political affiliations: Democratic Socialist Party (1982–1990)
- Spouse: Paul O'Sullivan (m. 1990)
- Children: 2
- Education: Trinity College Dublin; University College Cork

Jan O'Sullivan (née Gale; born 6 December 1950) is an Irish former Labour Party politician who served as Minister for Education and Skills from 2014 to 2016 and as a Minister of State from 2011 to 2014. She served as a Teachta Dála (TD) for the Limerick City constituency from 2011 to 2020, and previously from 1998 to 2011 for the Limerick East constituency.

== Personal life ==
O'Sullivan was born in Clonlara, County Clare, in 1950. She was educated at Villiers School, Limerick, where her father was a journalist. After graduating from Trinity College Dublin, she took a Higher Diploma in Education at University College Cork. After working as a teacher for a short period of time, she studied as a Montessori teacher while living in Canada. After returning to Ireland, in the late 1970s, O'Sullivan helped to run Limerick's family planning clinic.

A member of the Church of Ireland, she married Paul O'Sullivan, a Catholic and a GP; they have one daughter and one son. She spent time at home while having her children and once they were in school she ran a playgroup in the mornings, spent time with the children in the afternoon and did political work in the evenings.

== Political career ==
=== Democratic Socialist: 1982–1990 ===
In 1982, O'Sullivan joined the Democratic Socialist Party (DSP), a small party founded by Limerick TD Jim Kemmy, who had previously been a members of the Labour Party. There had been no political tradition in her family – her parents had supported different parties – and her choice of party was based on her support for Kemmy's anti-nationalist stance on Northern Ireland, and his advocacy of family planning services and a pro-choice approach to abortion. Family planning was deeply controversial in Ireland from the 1970s to the 1990s, particularly in Limerick, where Kemmy had lost his Dáil seat at the November 1982 general election, after being denounced by the Catholic Church for his opposition to the Eighth Amendment of the Constitution. Those such as O'Sullivan who were involved in the family planning services which Kemmy had helped found were labelled "Kemmy's Femmies".

O'Sullivan was elected to Limerick City Council in 1985, she also served as a member of the Mid-Western Health Board from 1991 to 2003.

=== Labour: 1990s ===
O'Sullivan joined the Labour Party when the DSP merged with Labour in 1990, having been one of the DSP's negotiators in the merger discussions. At the 1992 general election, as the running-mate Jim Kemmy, she narrowly missed winning a second seat for Labour in Limerick East. In 1993, she was elected to the 20th Seanad on the Administrative Panel, and became leader of the Labour group in Seanad Éireann.

From 1993 to 1994, O'Sullivan was Mayor of Limerick. Her religion twice became an issue in 1994, when she was prevented from opening a Christian Brothers School and from reading a lesson at a mass for Limerick's civic week.

O'Sullivan was unsuccessful again at the 1997 general election, but after Kemmy's death in September 1997, she was selected as the Labour Party candidate for the by-election in March 1998. She held the seat in a close three-way contest, becoming the first female TD from County Limerick since Kathleen O'Callaghan in 1921. Both the Fianna Fáil and Fine Gael candidates in the by-election were also women.

=== Labour: 2000s ===
O'Sullivan was re-elected at the 2002, 2007 and 2011 general elections, and at the 1999 local elections became Limerick's first alderwoman (as well as its last, as the title was abolished by the Local Government Act 2001).

In the 28th Dáil, she was the Labour Party Spokesperson on Justice and Equality and a member of the Oireachtas Joint Committee on Justice, Equality and Women's Rights. In the 29th Dáil, she was vice-chair of both the Dáil Select Committee on Education and Science and the Joint Committee on Education and Science, as well as her party's spokesperson on Education and Science.

After Labour's failed to make gains at the 2007 general election, Pat Rabbitte resigned as leader and the outgoing deputy leader, Liz McManus, did not seek re-election. Eamon Gilmore was elected unopposed as leader, O'Sullivan stood for the deputy leadership, and was defeated by Dublin West TD Joan Burton, by 1,480 votes to 1,276. In a frontbench reshuffle on 16 September 2007, Gilmore appointed O'Sullivan as Spokesperson for Health.

=== Government: 2011–2016 ===
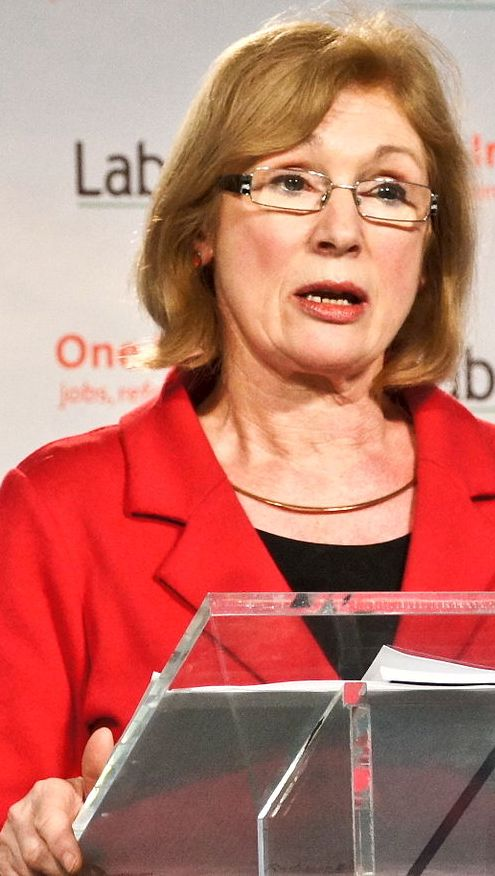
O'Sullivan in 2011

On 10 March 2011, she was appointed by the Fine Gael–Labour government as Minister of State at the Department of Foreign Affairs and Trade with special responsibility for Trade and Development. On 20 December 2011, she was appointed Minister of State at the Department of Environment, Community and Local Government with special responsibility for Housing and Planning. She attended meetings of the cabinet, a position described as a "super junior" minister.

In July 2014, she was appointed Minister for Education and Skills. She continued the promotion of plurality in a church-dominated system by divesting schools of church patronage, and announced new multi-denominational schools under the patronage divesting process.

In March 2015, the government, with O'Sullivan the minister responsible, confirmed it would lock away for 75 years any statements it received from victims of child sexual abuse (almost twice the normal length). This decision was criticised by survivors.

=== Opposition: 2016–2020 ===
O'Sullivan retained her seat in the 2016 general election, one of only seven Labour TDs to be elected. The party did not enter government, though O'Sullivan retained her position as Minister for Education and Skills until talks on government formation had concluded and the formation of a new government on 6 May 2016.

She lost her seat at the 2020 general election.

Civic offices
Preceded by Joe Quinn	Mayor of Limerick; 1993–1994	Succeeded by Dick Sadler
Political offices
Preceded by Ruairi Quinn	Minister for Education and Skills; 2014–2016	Succeeded by Richard Bruton

Dáil	Election	Deputy (Party)	Deputy (Party)	Deputy (Party)	Deputy (Party)	Deputy (Party)
13th	1948	Michael Keyes (Lab)	Robert Ryan (FF)	James Reidy (FG)	Daniel Bourke (FF)	4 seats 1948–1981
14th	1951	Michael Keyes (Lab)	Tadhg Crowley (FF)	James Reidy (FG)	Daniel Bourke (FF)	4 seats 1948–1981
14th	1952 by-election	Michael Keyes (Lab)	Tadhg Crowley (FF)	James Reidy (FG)	John Carew (FG)	4 seats 1948–1981
15th	1954	Michael Keyes (Lab)	Tadhg Crowley (FF)	Donogh O'Malley (FF)	John Carew (FG)	4 seats 1948–1981
16th	1957	Ted Russell (Ind.)	Paddy Clohessy (FF)	Donogh O'Malley (FF)	John Carew (FG)	4 seats 1948–1981
17th	1961	Stephen Coughlan (Lab)	Paddy Clohessy (FF)	Donogh O'Malley (FF)	Tom O'Donnell (FG)	4 seats 1948–1981
18th	1965	Stephen Coughlan (Lab)	Paddy Clohessy (FF)	Donogh O'Malley (FF)	Tom O'Donnell (FG)	4 seats 1948–1981
18th	1968 by-election	Stephen Coughlan (Lab)	Paddy Clohessy (FF)	Desmond O'Malley (FF)	Tom O'Donnell (FG)	4 seats 1948–1981
19th	1969	Stephen Coughlan (Lab)	Michael Herbert (FF)	Desmond O'Malley (FF)	Tom O'Donnell (FG)	4 seats 1948–1981
20th	1973	Stephen Coughlan (Lab)	Michael Herbert (FF)	Desmond O'Malley (FF)	Tom O'Donnell (FG)	4 seats 1948–1981
21st	1977	Michael Lipper (Ind.)	Michael Herbert (FF)	Desmond O'Malley (FF)	Tom O'Donnell (FG)	4 seats 1948–1981
22nd	1981	Jim Kemmy (Ind.)	Peadar Clohessy (FF)	Desmond O'Malley (FF)	Tom O'Donnell (FG)	Michael Noonan (FG)
23rd	1982 (Feb)	Jim Kemmy (DSP)	Willie O'Dea (FF)	Desmond O'Malley (FF)	Tom O'Donnell (FG)	Michael Noonan (FG)
24th	1982 (Nov)	Frank Prendergast (Lab)	Willie O'Dea (FF)	Desmond O'Malley (FF)	Tom O'Donnell (FG)	Michael Noonan (FG)
25th	1987	Jim Kemmy (DSP)	Willie O'Dea (FF)	Desmond O'Malley (PDs)	Peadar Clohessy (PDs)	Michael Noonan (FG)
26th	1989	Jim Kemmy (DSP)	Willie O'Dea (FF)	Desmond O'Malley (PDs)	Peadar Clohessy (PDs)	Michael Noonan (FG)
27th	1992	Jim Kemmy (Lab)	Willie O'Dea (FF)	Desmond O'Malley (PDs)	Peadar Clohessy (PDs)	Michael Noonan (FG)
28th	1997	Jim Kemmy (Lab)	Willie O'Dea (FF)	Desmond O'Malley (PDs)	Eddie Wade (FF)	Michael Noonan (FG)
28th	1998 by-election	Jan O'Sullivan (Lab)	Willie O'Dea (FF)	Desmond O'Malley (PDs)	Eddie Wade (FF)	Michael Noonan (FG)
29th	2002	Jan O'Sullivan (Lab)	Willie O'Dea (FF)	Tim O'Malley (PDs)	Peter Power (FF)	Michael Noonan (FG)
30th	2007	Jan O'Sullivan (Lab)	Willie O'Dea (FF)	Kieran O'Donnell (FG)	Peter Power (FF)	Michael Noonan (FG)
31st	2011	Constituency abolished. See Limerick City and Limerick				

Dáil	Election	Deputy (Party)	Deputy (Party)	Deputy (Party)	Deputy (Party)
31st	2011	Jan O'Sullivan (Lab)	Willie O'Dea (FF)	Kieran O'Donnell (FG)	Michael Noonan (FG)
32nd	2016	Jan O'Sullivan (Lab)	Willie O'Dea (FF)	Maurice Quinlivan (SF)	Michael Noonan (FG)
33rd	2020	Brian Leddin (GP)	Willie O'Dea (FF)	Maurice Quinlivan (SF)	Kieran O'Donnell (FG)
34th	2024	Conor Sheehan (Lab)	Willie O'Dea (FF)	Maurice Quinlivan (SF)	Kieran O'Donnell (FG)
