= Stephen Coughlan =

Irish politician (1910–1994)

Teachta Dála
- In office October 1961 – June 1977
- Constituency: Limerick East

Mayor of Limerick
- In office 1951–1952
- In office 1969–1970

Personal details
- Born: 26 December 1910 Limerick, Ireland
- Died: 20 December 1994 (aged 83)
- Party: Clann na Poblachta (1950s); Labour Party
- Spouse: Margaret Hanley (m. 1943)
- Children: 3
- Education: Blackrock College

Military service
- Branch/service: Irish Republican Army
- Years of service: c. 1930–1945

Stephen Coughlan (26 December 1910 – 20 December 1994) was an Irish Labour Party politician who served for sixteen years as TD for Limerick East. During the 1930s and 40s, he was a member of the Irish Republican Army but in the post World War II period, he moved into politics, first with the Republican Clann na Poblachta party and then later with the Labour Party. After becoming extremely politically powerful in his home of Limerick City, Coughlan was criticised as being an extremely parochial politician who jealously guarded his power base against any challenger, even those in his own party, which resulted in a number of local splits and rivalries that ultimately corroded his support. Politically and socially conservative, Coughlan was frequently at odds with the rest of the Labour party, while his "colourful" behaviour often drew national attention.

== Background ==
Coughlan was born in Limerick City, to a father Coughlan described as highly religious and to a mother Coughlan recalled as being a staunch Irish Republican. Coughlan educated at the local Presentation Sisters’ school before later boarding at Blackrock College, Dublin. He moved to Tralee in County Kerry in 1928 to become an insurance clerk. It was while Coughlan was in Tralee that he was recruited in the Irish Republican Army, with whom he remained a member until 1945. Coughlan claimed that during his time in the IRA he was involved in an unsuccessful assassination attempt upon Eoin O'Duffy, leader of the Blueshirts, with whom the IRA was engaged in a bitter feud with around 1933. It is also claimed that one of Coughlan's final acts in the IRA was an unsuccessful attempt to prevent O'Duffy and his Irish Brigade departing for the Spanish Civil War by ship from Limerick.

In December 1944, Charlie Kerins of Tralee, with whom Coughlan had developed a friendship, was executed for his role as a Chief of Staff of the IRA. His death prompted Coughlan to turn towards constitutional politics.

== Political career ==
=== Clann na Poblachta ===
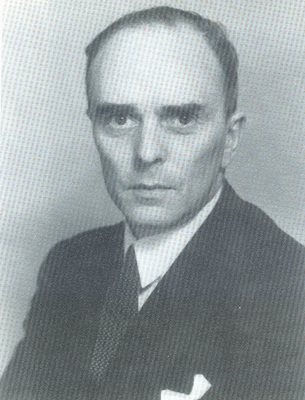
Coughlan was a founding member of Seán MacBride's Republican party Clann na Poblachta in 1947. Coughlan and MacBride maintained a close relationship throughout their lives.

Through his Republican and IRA connections, Coughlan became a founding member of Clann na Poblachta, a Republican party founded by Seán MacBride that attempted to overtake Fianna Fáil from the political left. Coughlan became chairman of Clann na Poblachta and in 1951 became represented the party when he became a member of Limerick Corporation. That same year he was named Mayor of Limerick for the first time. He stood for election as a Clann na Poblachta candidate at the 1954 general election, when he won the second-highest number of first-preference votes, but in later counts missed out on a seat by a margin of just five votes. A recount still left only a difference of 29 votes. He stood again for Clann na Poblachta at the 1957 general election, but his vote had fallen significantly and he was again unsuccessful.

=== Labour TD ===
As Clann na Poblachta declined in support in the late 1950s, Coughlan left them and joined the Labour Party. He was elected as a Labour candidate at the 1961 general election, taking his seat in the 17th Dáil. In doing so Coughlan beat out former Clann party member, veteran campaigner and stalwart of Limerick politics Ted Russell.

As a new member of Labour, Coughlan joined an existing rural republican wing of the party that included the likes of Dan Spring, Sean Treacy and Thomas Kyne. In 1963, Coughlan helped bring former Clann na Poblachta comrade Noël Browne into the Labour party, an action he supposedly regretted the rest of his life.

In order to make headway in politics, Coughlan more or less had to abandon his previous profession as a local bookmaker and publican in order to campaign. Once he broke through, however, Coughlan was noted, even by his critics, as a fiercely active politician in tune with his constituents. As a TD, instead of using the position to discuss national politics in Dáil Éireann, Coughlan's contributions in the 1960s were almost exclusively related to local Limerick issues.

It was in 1966 that Coughlan first began to clash with fellow Limerick Labour member Jim Kemmy, something that would go on to become a reoccurring feature of both men's careers. Kemmy was a Limerick bricklayer who had self-taught himself about socialism before joining the Labour party in 1963. Kemmy proved to be an energetic organiser and it didn't take him long to recruit 100 working-class locals as new branch members. Coughlan, however, was not impressed. When Kemmy's group organised a press conference to announce some plans they had and to push for more members, Coughlan arrived at the press meeting flanked by a number of former Clann na Poblachta members, barred the doors to journalists, seized all printed materials and effectively shut the conference down. The incident prompted an internal investigation by Labour, who sent high-profile members Brendan Corish and Michael O'Leary. A public meeting was called between all involved, which saw Kemmy's faction of mainly urban Limerick members pitted against Coughlan's mostly rural supporters. Coughlan attempted to have Kemmy expelled but didn't have enough votes to carry the motion. Nothing was settled and the acrimony between Coughlan and Kemmy was to continue for years to come.

Coughlan was also known for his considerable thirst for publicity. One anecdote recalls that in 1968, upon learning a Limerick mother was due to give birth to triplets, Coughlan rushed over to the hospital to be there. Coughlan had his picture taken with them before then later in the Dáil demanding that state benefits for triplets be increased. Another recalls that in 1967, following the closure of a meat factory in Limerick, Coughlan showed up at the Dáil at the wrong debate looking dishevelled and began interrupting the proceedings to try to turn the subject to the factory. Fellow members of the Dáil accused Coughlan of being drunk as well as out of order before he was escorted away by Dáil ushers. Although the stunt was not received well by fellow politicians, Coughlan's support base back in Limerick were pleased.

For the Christmas of 1968, Coughlan sent out 23,000 Christmas cards to his constituents that read as follows:

I am your voice to question wrongs; To state your case and plead it; To wrangle for your civic rights, To quarrel if you need it. And I who am your voice, salute you and give you festive greeting. May your Christmas time be merry as a Dáil Éireann meeting, though not so acrimonious. And may your heart rejoice. I wish you all what you'd wish yourself, for am I not your voice?

A devout Catholic, Coughlan was known for his social conservatism. During a debate in the Dáil in March 1971, Coughlan summed up his mentality by stating "If we resort to the despicable practices of contraception, divorce and abortion, we shall be finished as a nation." Over the years when those issues would come up in the Dáil, Coughlan would find himself conspicuously absent when it came time to vote in order to avoid losing the party whip.

=== Second term as Mayor of Limerick ===
In 1969, Coughlan was still a TD when he became Mayor of Limerick (head of the corporation) for a second time (Dual mandate in Ireland was not abolished until 2003), and it was this period that was marked by some of the most high-profile controversies of Coughlan's career.

==== 1969 general election ====
By 1969, the Labour party was experiencing a major upswing in the number of members interested in socialism as the political trend of the New Left swept across western countries. Indeed, Labour party leader Brendan Corish announced the party's slogan for that year's general election would be "The seventies will be socialist!". This attracted a number of "intellectuals" to stand for the party as candidates, such as Justin Keating, Conor Cruise O'Brien, David Thornley and Noël Browne. Coughlan was not happy with the new direction of the party nor these candidates. At this time Coughlan had developed a new relationship with the editor of the main local newspaper, the Limerick Leader. Using this connection, Coughlan managed to have an "anonymous" leader published on the front page of the Limerick Leader on election day 1969 in which the author lamented the new direction of the Labour party as well as its new batch of candidates, but still implored the readers to vote for Coughlan. The letter was also designed to erode support for some of Coughlan's local rivals; Michael Lipper and Tony Pratschke ran alongside Coughlan in the 1969 election on the Labour ticket, but both were considerably more left-wing than Coughlan and had embraced the party's new direction.

==== South African Rugby team in Limerick ====
In late 1969, the South African Rugby team has been touring the United Kingdom. The tour had been marked by a number of Anti-Apartheid protests. Going into 1970, the team was due to continue the tour on into Ireland, including games to be held in Limerick. However, the protests in the UK had prompted the Irish left into action as well. Jim Kemmy, himself a longstanding rugby fan as well as the chairman of a local anti-apartheid group, promised to organise opposition to the South Africans playing in Limerick. However, there was little consensus in Limerick about what the reaction to the team should be. Unlike other parts of Ireland, all social classes supported Rugby in Limerick, and thus many citizens of the city feared to "politicise" the sport for fear of breaking that unity. As the Irish left ramped up efforts to create a boycott against the team (including by the Irish Labour party of whom Coughlan was a member), the Limerick Leader opined that while Apartheid was "indefensible", so too was Communism and suggested that the Anti-Apartheid campaign was going to be overtaken by Communists.

Coughlan took a similar line at first; in December 1969 he declared he would not meet with the South African team, but stated that he feared "revolutionary communist groups" would use the boycott as an excuse to "stir up trouble". He also said that in relation to the boycott, some of his colleagues in Labour had "gone haywire". When Barry Desmond TD announced that Labour as a party would back the boycott, Coughlan was furious and declared "the damn cheek for this jumped up overnight politician to come to us in Limerick to tell us how to act".

The matter of the South African game quickly became a national issue. Taoiseach Jack Lynch made it known he would not be in attendance. The Ulster Unionist Party began threatening to hold a counter-protest in favour of the South Africans, while the Ulster Volunteer Force also threatened action if the South Africans were interfered with. On Saturday 10 January, the South Africans played at Lansdowne Road in Dublin. Over 6,000 people peacefully protested against the match, including numerous high-profile Labour members. Despite the Dublin match passing without major incident, the Limerick Leader ran panicked articles about the upcoming Limerick match, suggesting "thousands" of outsiders and "extreme left-wingers" were due to descend on the city.

On 14 January, the South African game went ahead in Limerick. Wet weather conditions and local attitudes meant that the protests were small in number, with 350 protesters standing out Thomond Park. Minor scuffles took place on O'Connell Street. Coughlan himself attended the match.

In the wake of the match, there was unease about Coughlan nationally in the Labour party for not actively protesting as well the fact he had publicly criticised high-profile Labour members for doing so.

==== Anti-Communist Campaign ====
In the days after the match, a local priest in Limerick claimed that a group of Maoists had physically threatened him and told him they were intent on destroying some of the local Catholic orders in the city. In response, the Limerick Labour Party claimed there were 200 Maoists operating in Limerick, mostly under the banner of the "Irish Revolutionary Youth Movement". Irish socialist historian Brian Hanley suggests there would have been no more than a grand total of six Maoists in Limerick at the time. They were, however, becoming more visible in Limerick after they had opened a socialist book store in the city. With tensions in the city highly elevated due to the South African tour, this group quickly became a focus of anger. On 26 January, the Limerick Leader called for the group to be "driven out" of the city, "the sooner the better".

Coughlan took up the cause. He became a letter campaign asking Limerick business not to sell radical literature. He began touring Limerick schools to lecture students on "the red menace". At one school, Crescent College, Coughlan directly accused one student of being a communist and demanded they be expelled. He also accused his former running mate and fellow Labour member Tony Pratschke, a teacher at the school, of also being a communist and called for him to be sacked. Only a threatened strike by the students prevented either action being taken.

Coughlan's endorsement of the idea that Limerick was being infiltrated by communists sent the city into a panic. Priests at the Augustinian Church began calling for the Maoists to be removed during mass. The Maoist book shop had its windows smashed out several times before in gunshots were fired into it in March. There was also an attempted firebombing. Commenting on the violence, Coughlan declared "Any fellow with one eye open, and the other closed could see this coming. I am vehemently opposed to [these communists]".

A small, allegedly neo-nazi group, "The National Movement", which had paraded around the city to welcome the South African team, began parading again and campaigning for Coughlan, declaring "he stood by you, now stand by him" as they asked for signatures on a petition aimed at shutting down the bookshop. When the National Movement presented their petition to Limerick Corporation, two Labour councillors called for a vote on a motion to thank them. In response, Jim Kemmy demanded that the national leadership of the Labour party take Coughlan to task.

==== Comments about Jews ====
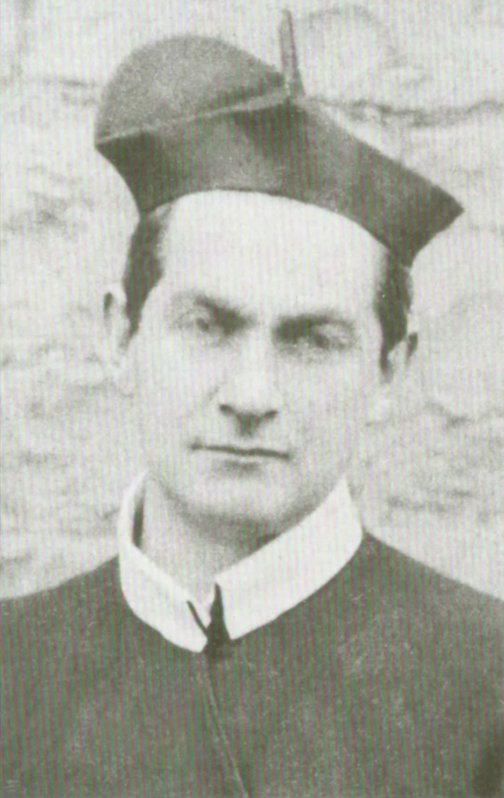
Coughlan's references to the actions of John Creagh against the Jewish community in Limerick in 1904 caused national controversy.

The current affairs magazine Nusight, edited by Vincent Browne, ran an article on the situation in Limerick. The article compared Coughlan to American segregationist George Wallace and speculated that Coughlan was veering towards fascism. The article made mention of the 1904 boycott in Limerick of Jews in the city, as well as attacks on Jehovah Witnesses in the 1950s.

In response to the article, Coughlan publicly declared that he was proud of what the Limerick people had done in those instances, and claimed his own parents had been involved. (Note: Historian Brian Hanley believes Coughlan's family were not involved at all and suggests Coughlan was either misremembering a different event, or was so keen to defend Limerick's reputation that he simply lied.) He defended the priest behind the boycott, stating "Fr Creagh, in a most courageous way, declared war on the Jews of Collooney Street" who had "been bleeding the working people of Limerick dry 70 years before". Coughlan's comments drew national attention and controversy. Coughlan tried to clarify that he "only" meant the Jews in the area who were exploiting money lending practices. Jewish Fianna Fáil TD Ben Briscoe lent Coughlan some credibility when he dismissed the idea of Coughlan being anti-semite.

Sensing that his political career could be hanging by a thread, Coughlan delivered a public speech in Limerick where he called for a new Ireland under a liberal constitution. The Irish Times commented that "Never before had such sentiment been uttered before by Mr Coughlan". They were not mentioned afterwards either. At a meeting of the Labour Party Administrative council, trade union leader Matthew Merrigan moved a motion to expel Coughlan from Labour over his comments. It was defeated 10 votes to 16. As a result, both Merrigan and Jim Kemmy quit the administrative council, with Kemmy leaving the Labour party entirely and taking a number of supporters with him.

Kemmy supporters put out a statement condemning Coughlan, stating that he "faithfully and consistently served the interests of the enemies of the workers...The anti-democratic and antisocialist campaigns, actions and speeches of the party deputy for east Limerick has made Limerick and the Labour Party a byword for bigotry and witch-hunting"

Kemmy would go on to form the Limerick Socialist Organisation in 1972, which later became the Democratic Socialist Party, which became a powerful force in Limerick politics in its own right.

=== Political decline and retirement ===
The early 1970s period had left Coughlan a diminishing star in Limerick politics. Michael Lipper, who had been the one to propose Coughlan as Mayor in 1969, was chosen as a Labour candidate for the 1973 general election in Limerick and served as a rallying point for Anti-Coughlan Labour members. Although Lipper was not successful, he performed much better than expected and demonstrated the scales were beginning to tip against Coughlan. The 1977 general election pitted Coughlan directly against Lipper when Lipper choose to run as an Independent. When all the votes were counted, Coughlan lost his seat to Lipper aided by the fact the Bishop of Limerick Jeremiah Newman threw his support behind Lipper, something that deeply annoyed Coughlan. Lipper was quickly readmitted back into Labour following the election as the Labour party itself saw that Coughlan was done for. In response, in April 1979 Coughlan and his son, also named Stephan Coughlan, both quit the Labour party, with Stephen senior effectively retiring from politics.

The bitterness apparently continued for many years afterwards; In March 1981 Coughlan (then 70 years old) and Lipper (then 49) happened to encounter each other while applying for medical cards. The two quickly got into an argument, with Lipper supposedly yelling at Coughlan "I'll blow your fucking head off if I can prove what you're saying about me", at which Coughlan claims Lipper then punched him in the chest three times. Lipper denied he ever touched Coughlan, telling Coughlan's solicitor "I have these hands for blessing myself and eating my food, and I pray for Mr Coughlan each day." The matter went to court but was dismissed by the judge.

Despite their differences, many years after their 1970s feud Jim Kemmy stated "I felt no bitterness towards Stevie Coughlan and I can recognise the good work he did."

== Personal life ==
Coughlan considered Seán MacBride a lifelong friend, and made him Godfather to his daughter Nellie. Coughlan also had two sons, Thady and Stephen. Thady served with him on Limerick Corporation during the 1970s and later became mayor.

Coughlan died at the Regional Hospital, Limerick, after a long illness, 20 December 1994.

== Notes ==
Civic offices
Preceded by Kevin Bradshaw	Mayor of Limerick; 1951–1952	Succeeded by Kevin Bradshaw
Preceded by Jack Bourke	Mayor of Limerick; 1969–1970	Succeeded by Joseph P. Liddy

Dáil	Election	Deputy (Party)	Deputy (Party)	Deputy (Party)	Deputy (Party)	Deputy (Party)
13th	1948	Michael Keyes (Lab)	Robert Ryan (FF)	James Reidy (FG)	Daniel Bourke (FF)	4 seats 1948–1981
14th	1951	Michael Keyes (Lab)	Tadhg Crowley (FF)	James Reidy (FG)	Daniel Bourke (FF)	4 seats 1948–1981
14th	1952 by-election	Michael Keyes (Lab)	Tadhg Crowley (FF)	James Reidy (FG)	John Carew (FG)	4 seats 1948–1981
15th	1954	Michael Keyes (Lab)	Tadhg Crowley (FF)	Donogh O'Malley (FF)	John Carew (FG)	4 seats 1948–1981
16th	1957	Ted Russell (Ind.)	Paddy Clohessy (FF)	Donogh O'Malley (FF)	John Carew (FG)	4 seats 1948–1981
17th	1961	Stephen Coughlan (Lab)	Paddy Clohessy (FF)	Donogh O'Malley (FF)	Tom O'Donnell (FG)	4 seats 1948–1981
18th	1965	Stephen Coughlan (Lab)	Paddy Clohessy (FF)	Donogh O'Malley (FF)	Tom O'Donnell (FG)	4 seats 1948–1981
18th	1968 by-election	Stephen Coughlan (Lab)	Paddy Clohessy (FF)	Desmond O'Malley (FF)	Tom O'Donnell (FG)	4 seats 1948–1981
19th	1969	Stephen Coughlan (Lab)	Michael Herbert (FF)	Desmond O'Malley (FF)	Tom O'Donnell (FG)	4 seats 1948–1981
20th	1973	Stephen Coughlan (Lab)	Michael Herbert (FF)	Desmond O'Malley (FF)	Tom O'Donnell (FG)	4 seats 1948–1981
21st	1977	Michael Lipper (Ind.)	Michael Herbert (FF)	Desmond O'Malley (FF)	Tom O'Donnell (FG)	4 seats 1948–1981
22nd	1981	Jim Kemmy (Ind.)	Peadar Clohessy (FF)	Desmond O'Malley (FF)	Tom O'Donnell (FG)	Michael Noonan (FG)
23rd	1982 (Feb)	Jim Kemmy (DSP)	Willie O'Dea (FF)	Desmond O'Malley (FF)	Tom O'Donnell (FG)	Michael Noonan (FG)
24th	1982 (Nov)	Frank Prendergast (Lab)	Willie O'Dea (FF)	Desmond O'Malley (FF)	Tom O'Donnell (FG)	Michael Noonan (FG)
25th	1987	Jim Kemmy (DSP)	Willie O'Dea (FF)	Desmond O'Malley (PDs)	Peadar Clohessy (PDs)	Michael Noonan (FG)
26th	1989	Jim Kemmy (DSP)	Willie O'Dea (FF)	Desmond O'Malley (PDs)	Peadar Clohessy (PDs)	Michael Noonan (FG)
27th	1992	Jim Kemmy (Lab)	Willie O'Dea (FF)	Desmond O'Malley (PDs)	Peadar Clohessy (PDs)	Michael Noonan (FG)
28th	1997	Jim Kemmy (Lab)	Willie O'Dea (FF)	Desmond O'Malley (PDs)	Eddie Wade (FF)	Michael Noonan (FG)
28th	1998 by-election	Jan O'Sullivan (Lab)	Willie O'Dea (FF)	Desmond O'Malley (PDs)	Eddie Wade (FF)	Michael Noonan (FG)
29th	2002	Jan O'Sullivan (Lab)	Willie O'Dea (FF)	Tim O'Malley (PDs)	Peter Power (FF)	Michael Noonan (FG)
30th	2007	Jan O'Sullivan (Lab)	Willie O'Dea (FF)	Kieran O'Donnell (FG)	Peter Power (FF)	Michael Noonan (FG)
31st	2011	Constituency abolished. See Limerick City and Limerick				
