= Paddy Clohessy =

Irish hurler and politician (1908–1971)

Teachta Dála
- In office March 1957 – June 1969
- Constituency: Limerick East

Personal details
- Born: 16 April 1908 Fedamore, County Limerick, Ireland
- Died: 8 August 1971 (aged 63) County Limerick, Ireland
- Party: Fianna Fáil
- Gaelic games career
- Height: 6 ft 1 in (185 cm)
- Sport: Hurling
- Position: Half-back
Club
- Years: Club
- Fedamore
Inter-county
- Years: County
- 1928–1940: Limerick
Inter-county titles
- Munster titles: 3
- All-Irelands: 4
- NHL: 4

Patrick Clohessy (16 April 1908 – 6 August 1971) was an Irish sportsperson and politician. He played hurling for his local club Fedamore and at senior level for the Limerick county team from 1928 until 1940. He later became a Fianna Fáil politician.

== Playing career ==
=== Club ===
Clohessy played club hurling with his local club in Fedamore. His brothers, Dave, Andy and Jack, also played for Fedamore. He won his sole senior county title with the club in 1927.

=== Inter-county ===
Clohessy first came to prominence on the inter-county scene as a member of the Limerick senior hurling team in 1928. At that stage Limerick were down the pecking order in terms of the top teams in the Munster Championship.

All this changed in 1933 when Limerick defeated the reigning provincial champions of Clare, giving Clohessy his first Munster title. The subsequent All-Ireland final pitted Limerick against Kilkenny – the winners of the championship in 1932. The game was a low-scoring affair with Kilkenny claiming the title on a score line of 1–7 to 0–6.

In 1934 Limerick began their fight back with Clohessy added a second Munster medal to his collection as the team beat Waterford. In their second consecutive All-Ireland final appearance Limerick faced Dublin. Dublin proved to be no pushover as the game ended in a draw on a score line of 2–7 to 3–4. The replay saw Limerick capture the title by five points giving Clohessy his first All-Ireland medal.

1935 saw Limerick capture Clohessy win his first National Hurling League title, however, he later missed out on a third Munster title due to injury. Clohessy was back for the All-Ireland final as Limerick took on Kilkenny once again. Limerick had a run of 31 unbeaten games; however, Kilkenny put an end to this by defeating Clohessy's team by just a single point.

In 1936 Clohessy added a second National League medal to his collection before collecting a third Munster medal. For the third time in four years Kilkenny provided the opposition in the subsequent All-Ireland final. Limerick, however, had the measure of them on the day and claimed victory on a score line of 5–6 to 1–5. It was Clohessy's second All-Ireland medal.

In 1937 Clohessy captured a fourth consecutive National League medal; however, Limerick later lost their provincial title for the first time since 1932. Three years later in 1940 Limerick regained their Munster title after an epic battle with Cork giving Clohessy his fourth provincial title. In the subsequent All-Ireland final the two outstanding teams of the decade, Kilkenny and Limerick, did battle once again. Kilkenny were not the force of old as a third All-Ireland medal went to Clohessy following a 3–7 to 1–7 victory. It was Clohessy's last major title with the Limerick inter-county hurlers as he retired from inter-county hurling following the victory.

=== Provincial ===
Clohessy also lined out with Munster in the inter-provincial hurling competition. He first played for his province in 1932, however, on that occasion his side was defeated by Leinster. Clohessy remained on the team and helped Munster to capture the Railway Cup title in 1934. He won a further four title sin-a-row in 1937, 1938, 1939 and 1940.

== Political career ==
A farmer by profession, he contested the 1954 general election in the Limerick East constituency but was not elected. He was elected to Dáil Éireann as a Fianna Fáil Teachta Dála (TD) at the subsequent 1957 general election and held his seat until retiring at the 1969 general election.

His nephew Peadar Clohessy was a Fianna Fáil and Progressive Democrats TD for Limerick East in the 1980s and 1990s.

== See also ==
- Families in the Oireachtas

== Sources ==
- Corry, Eoghan, The GAA Book of Lists (Hodder Headline Ireland, 2005).

Dáil	Election	Deputy (Party)	Deputy (Party)	Deputy (Party)	Deputy (Party)	Deputy (Party)
13th	1948	Michael Keyes (Lab)	Robert Ryan (FF)	James Reidy (FG)	Daniel Bourke (FF)	4 seats 1948–1981
14th	1951	Michael Keyes (Lab)	Tadhg Crowley (FF)	James Reidy (FG)	Daniel Bourke (FF)	4 seats 1948–1981
14th	1952 by-election	Michael Keyes (Lab)	Tadhg Crowley (FF)	James Reidy (FG)	John Carew (FG)	4 seats 1948–1981
15th	1954	Michael Keyes (Lab)	Tadhg Crowley (FF)	Donogh O'Malley (FF)	John Carew (FG)	4 seats 1948–1981
16th	1957	Ted Russell (Ind.)	Paddy Clohessy (FF)	Donogh O'Malley (FF)	John Carew (FG)	4 seats 1948–1981
17th	1961	Stephen Coughlan (Lab)	Paddy Clohessy (FF)	Donogh O'Malley (FF)	Tom O'Donnell (FG)	4 seats 1948–1981
18th	1965	Stephen Coughlan (Lab)	Paddy Clohessy (FF)	Donogh O'Malley (FF)	Tom O'Donnell (FG)	4 seats 1948–1981
18th	1968 by-election	Stephen Coughlan (Lab)	Paddy Clohessy (FF)	Desmond O'Malley (FF)	Tom O'Donnell (FG)	4 seats 1948–1981
19th	1969	Stephen Coughlan (Lab)	Michael Herbert (FF)	Desmond O'Malley (FF)	Tom O'Donnell (FG)	4 seats 1948–1981
20th	1973	Stephen Coughlan (Lab)	Michael Herbert (FF)	Desmond O'Malley (FF)	Tom O'Donnell (FG)	4 seats 1948–1981
21st	1977	Michael Lipper (Ind.)	Michael Herbert (FF)	Desmond O'Malley (FF)	Tom O'Donnell (FG)	4 seats 1948–1981
22nd	1981	Jim Kemmy (Ind.)	Peadar Clohessy (FF)	Desmond O'Malley (FF)	Tom O'Donnell (FG)	Michael Noonan (FG)
23rd	1982 (Feb)	Jim Kemmy (DSP)	Willie O'Dea (FF)	Desmond O'Malley (FF)	Tom O'Donnell (FG)	Michael Noonan (FG)
24th	1982 (Nov)	Frank Prendergast (Lab)	Willie O'Dea (FF)	Desmond O'Malley (FF)	Tom O'Donnell (FG)	Michael Noonan (FG)
25th	1987	Jim Kemmy (DSP)	Willie O'Dea (FF)	Desmond O'Malley (PDs)	Peadar Clohessy (PDs)	Michael Noonan (FG)
26th	1989	Jim Kemmy (DSP)	Willie O'Dea (FF)	Desmond O'Malley (PDs)	Peadar Clohessy (PDs)	Michael Noonan (FG)
27th	1992	Jim Kemmy (Lab)	Willie O'Dea (FF)	Desmond O'Malley (PDs)	Peadar Clohessy (PDs)	Michael Noonan (FG)
28th	1997	Jim Kemmy (Lab)	Willie O'Dea (FF)	Desmond O'Malley (PDs)	Eddie Wade (FF)	Michael Noonan (FG)
28th	1998 by-election	Jan O'Sullivan (Lab)	Willie O'Dea (FF)	Desmond O'Malley (PDs)	Eddie Wade (FF)	Michael Noonan (FG)
29th	2002	Jan O'Sullivan (Lab)	Willie O'Dea (FF)	Tim O'Malley (PDs)	Peter Power (FF)	Michael Noonan (FG)
30th	2007	Jan O'Sullivan (Lab)	Willie O'Dea (FF)	Kieran O'Donnell (FG)	Peter Power (FF)	Michael Noonan (FG)
31st	2011	Constituency abolished. See Limerick City and Limerick				
