= Peadar Clohessy =

Irish politician (1933–2014)

Teachta Dála
- In office February 1987 – June 1997
- In office June 1981 – February 1982
- Constituency: Limerick East

Personal details
- Born: 19 December 1933 County Limerick, Ireland
- Died: 18 January 2014 (aged 80) County Limerick, Ireland
- Party: Progressive Democrats; Fianna Fáil
- Spouse: Jean Clohessy (m. 1962; died 2004)
- Children: 6
- Relatives: Paddy Clohessy (uncle)

Patrick Peadar Clohessy (19 December 1933 – 18 January 2014) was an Irish politician from Fedamore, County Limerick. He was a Teachta Dála (TD) for the Limerick East constituency from 1981 to 1982 and from 1987 to 1997.

A farmer, Clohessy was first elected as a Fianna Fáil TD at the 1981 general election on his third attempt. He lost his seat at the February 1982 election, and did not contest the November 1982 election. He joined the Progressive Democrats as a founding member, and was one of 14 TDs elected at the 1987 general election, the first election after the party was founded. He retained his seat until retiring at the 1997 general election. He was Chief Whip of the Progressive Democrats and assistant Government Whip from 1989 to 1992.

In 1979 he was elected to Limerick County Council, where he served for 25 years, and was chairman of the council in 1992.

Clohessy died in County Limerick on 18 January 2014, aged 80.

Dáil	Election	Deputy (Party)	Deputy (Party)	Deputy (Party)	Deputy (Party)	Deputy (Party)
13th	1948	Michael Keyes (Lab)	Robert Ryan (FF)	James Reidy (FG)	Daniel Bourke (FF)	4 seats 1948–1981
14th	1951	Michael Keyes (Lab)	Tadhg Crowley (FF)	James Reidy (FG)	Daniel Bourke (FF)	4 seats 1948–1981
14th	1952 by-election	Michael Keyes (Lab)	Tadhg Crowley (FF)	James Reidy (FG)	John Carew (FG)	4 seats 1948–1981
15th	1954	Michael Keyes (Lab)	Tadhg Crowley (FF)	Donogh O'Malley (FF)	John Carew (FG)	4 seats 1948–1981
16th	1957	Ted Russell (Ind.)	Paddy Clohessy (FF)	Donogh O'Malley (FF)	John Carew (FG)	4 seats 1948–1981
17th	1961	Stephen Coughlan (Lab)	Paddy Clohessy (FF)	Donogh O'Malley (FF)	Tom O'Donnell (FG)	4 seats 1948–1981
18th	1965	Stephen Coughlan (Lab)	Paddy Clohessy (FF)	Donogh O'Malley (FF)	Tom O'Donnell (FG)	4 seats 1948–1981
18th	1968 by-election	Stephen Coughlan (Lab)	Paddy Clohessy (FF)	Desmond O'Malley (FF)	Tom O'Donnell (FG)	4 seats 1948–1981
19th	1969	Stephen Coughlan (Lab)	Michael Herbert (FF)	Desmond O'Malley (FF)	Tom O'Donnell (FG)	4 seats 1948–1981
20th	1973	Stephen Coughlan (Lab)	Michael Herbert (FF)	Desmond O'Malley (FF)	Tom O'Donnell (FG)	4 seats 1948–1981
21st	1977	Michael Lipper (Ind.)	Michael Herbert (FF)	Desmond O'Malley (FF)	Tom O'Donnell (FG)	4 seats 1948–1981
22nd	1981	Jim Kemmy (Ind.)	Peadar Clohessy (FF)	Desmond O'Malley (FF)	Tom O'Donnell (FG)	Michael Noonan (FG)
23rd	1982 (Feb)	Jim Kemmy (DSP)	Willie O'Dea (FF)	Desmond O'Malley (FF)	Tom O'Donnell (FG)	Michael Noonan (FG)
24th	1982 (Nov)	Frank Prendergast (Lab)	Willie O'Dea (FF)	Desmond O'Malley (FF)	Tom O'Donnell (FG)	Michael Noonan (FG)
25th	1987	Jim Kemmy (DSP)	Willie O'Dea (FF)	Desmond O'Malley (PDs)	Peadar Clohessy (PDs)	Michael Noonan (FG)
26th	1989	Jim Kemmy (DSP)	Willie O'Dea (FF)	Desmond O'Malley (PDs)	Peadar Clohessy (PDs)	Michael Noonan (FG)
27th	1992	Jim Kemmy (Lab)	Willie O'Dea (FF)	Desmond O'Malley (PDs)	Peadar Clohessy (PDs)	Michael Noonan (FG)
28th	1997	Jim Kemmy (Lab)	Willie O'Dea (FF)	Desmond O'Malley (PDs)	Eddie Wade (FF)	Michael Noonan (FG)
28th	1998 by-election	Jan O'Sullivan (Lab)	Willie O'Dea (FF)	Desmond O'Malley (PDs)	Eddie Wade (FF)	Michael Noonan (FG)
29th	2002	Jan O'Sullivan (Lab)	Willie O'Dea (FF)	Tim O'Malley (PDs)	Peter Power (FF)	Michael Noonan (FG)
30th	2007	Jan O'Sullivan (Lab)	Willie O'Dea (FF)	Kieran O'Donnell (FG)	Peter Power (FF)	Michael Noonan (FG)
31st	2011	Constituency abolished. See Limerick City and Limerick				
