= Limerick City (Dáil constituency) =

Dáil constituency (2011–present)

- Dáil constituency
- Location of Limerick City within Ireland
- Interactive map of constituency boundaries since the 2024 general election
- Major settlements: Limerick

Current constituency
- Created: 2011
- Seats: 4
- TDs: Willie O'Dea (FF); Kieran O'Donnell (FG); Maurice Quinlivan (SF); Conor Sheehan (Lab)
- Local government area: Limerick City and County
- Created from: Limerick East
- EP constituency: South

Limerick City is a parliamentary constituency in Dáil Éireann, the lower house of the Irish parliament or Oireachtas. The constituency elects four deputies (Teachtaí Dála, commonly known as TDs) on the system of proportional representation by means of the single transferable vote (PR-STV).

== History and boundaries ==
The Constituency Commission proposed in 2007 that at the next general election a constituency called Limerick City be created from territory which had been in Limerick East. It was established by the Electoral (Amendment) Act 2009. Limerick City was first represented at the 2011 general election.

In the Constituency Review Report 2023, the Electoral Commission recommended the transfer of the electoral divisions of Birdhill, Kilcomenty and Newport to the new Tipperary North constituency, thereby making the Limerick constituencies contiguous with the county boundary.

The Electoral (Amendment) Act 2023 defines the constituency as:

"In the city and county of Limerick, the electoral divisions of:

Abbey A, Abbey B, Abbey C, Abbey D, Ballinacurra A, Ballinacurra B, Ballynanty, Castle A, Castle B, Castle C, Castle D, Coolraine, Custom House, Dock A, Dock B, Dock C, Dock D, Farranshone, Galvone A, Galvone B, Glentworth A, Glentworth B, Glentworth C, John's A, John's B, John's C, Killeely A, Killeely B, Market, Prospect A, Prospect B, Rathbane, Shannon A, Shannon B, Singland A, Singland B, St. Laurence,, in the former City of Limerick;
Abington, Ballybricken, Ballycummin, Ballysimon, Ballyvarra, Caherconlish East, Caherconlish West, Castleconnell, Clonkeen, Glenstal, Limerick North Rural, Limerick South Rural, Roxborough, in the former Rural District of Limerick No. 1"

Changes to the Limerick City constituency
Years	TDs	Boundaries	Notes
2011–2016	4	Limerick City, and in County Limerick the electoral divisions of Ballycummin, Ballysimon, Ballyvarra, Castleconnell, Limerick South Rural, in the former Rural District of Limerick No. 1; and, in County Clare the electoral division of Ballyglass in the former Rural District of Meelick.	Created from Limerick East, with transfer to Limerick of Cahercorney, Hospital, Kilteely, in the former Rural District of Kilmallock, Abington, Ballybricken, Caherconlish East, Caherconlish West, Caherelly, Cappamore, Clonkeen, Doon West, Glenstal, Kilmurry, Roxborough, in the former Rural District of Limerick No. 1, Bilboa, Doon South, Grean, Oola, Templebredon, in the former Rural District of Tipperary No. 1.
2016–2020	4	In Limerick City and County The former Limerick City, and the electoral divisions of Abington, Ballybricken, Ballycummin, Ballysimon, Ballyvarra, Caherconlish East, Caherconlish West, Castleconnell, Cappamore, Clonkeen, Doon West, Glenstal, Limerick South Rural, Roxborough, in the former Rural District of Limerick No. 1; and Bilboa, in the former Rural District of Tipperary No. 2; and, in County Clare the electoral division of Ballyglass in the former Rural District of Meelick.	Transfer from Limerick of Abington, Ballybricken, Caherconlish East, Caherconlish West, Cappamore, Clonkeen, Doon West, Glenstal, Roxborough in the former Rural District of Limerick No. 1; and Bilboa in the former Rural District of Tipperary No. 2.
2020–	4	In Limerick City and County, the electoral divisions of Abbey A, Abbey B, Abbey C, Abbey D, Ballinacurra A, Ballinacurra B, Ballynanty, Castle A, Castle B, Castle C, Castle D, Coolraine, Custom House, Dock A, Dock B, Dock C, Dock D, Farranshone, Galvone A, Galvone B, Glentworth A, Glentworth B, Glentworth C, John’s A, John’s B, John’s C, Kilkeely A, Kilkeely B, Market, Prospect A, Prospect B, Rathbane, Shannon A, Shannon B, Singland A, Singland B, St. Laurence, in the former City of Limerick; Abington, Ballybricken, Ballycummin, Ballysimon, Ballyvarra, Caherconlish East, Caherconlish West, Castleconnell, Clonkeen, Glenstal, Limerick North Rural, Limerick South Rural, Roxborough, in the former Rural District of Limerick No. 1; and in County Tipperary the electoral divisions of Birdhill, Kilcomenty, Newport in the former Rural District of Nenagh.	Transfer to Limerick County of Cappamore and Doon West in the former Rural District of Limerick No. 1; and Bilboa in the former Rural District of Tipperary No. 2; transfer to Clare of the electoral division of Ballyglass in the former Rural District of Meelick; and transfer from Tipperary of the electoral divisions of Birdhill, Kilcomenty, Newport in the former Rural District of Nenagh

== TDs ==
Teachtaí Dála (TDs) for Limerick City 2011–
Key to parties: FF = Fianna Fáil; FG = Fine Gael; GP = Green; Lab = Labour; SF = Sinn Féin
Dáil	Election	Deputy (Party)	Deputy (Party)	Deputy (Party)	Deputy (Party)
31st	2011	Jan O'Sullivan (Lab)	Willie O'Dea (FF)	Kieran O'Donnell (FG)	Michael Noonan (FG)
32nd	2016	Jan O'Sullivan (Lab)	Willie O'Dea (FF)	Maurice Quinlivan (SF)	Michael Noonan (FG)
33rd	2020	Brian Leddin (GP)	Willie O'Dea (FF)	Maurice Quinlivan (SF)	Kieran O'Donnell (FG)
34th	2024	Conor Sheehan (Lab)	Willie O'Dea (FF)	Maurice Quinlivan (SF)	Kieran O'Donnell (FG)

Note: The columns in this table are used only for presentational purposes, and no significance should be attached to the order of columns. For details of the order in which seats were won at each election, see the detailed results of that election.

== Elections ==
*: Outgoing TD

=== 2024 general election ===
2024 general election: Limerick City
Party	Candidate	FPv%	Count														
Party	Candidate	FPv%	1	2	3	4	5	6	7	8	9	10	11	12	13	14	15
Fianna Fáil	Willie O'Dea	19.5	8,214	8,282	8,332	8,402	8,426	8,523									
Fine Gael	Kieran O'Donnell	14.5	6,133	6,190	6,216	6,241	6,250	6,260	6,284	6,600	6,782	8,755					
Sinn Féin	Maurice Quinlivan	14.1	5,936	5,960	6,021	6,053	6,184	6,305	7,420	7,528	8,242	8,350	8,358	8,385	9,236		
Fianna Fáil	Dee Ryan	6.7	2,831	2,863	2,887	2,931	2,942	2,949	2,982	3,222	3,371	3,777	3,945	3,954	4,346	4,427	
Fine Gael	Maria Byrne	6.7	2,813	2,835	2,862	2,897	2,904	2,914	2,926	3,082	3,173						
Social Democrats	Elisa O'Donovan	6.7	2,808	2,841	2,919	2,966	3,305	3,319	3,449	3,825	3,997	4,152	4,195	4,201	4,550	4,736	5,797
Labour	Conor Sheehan	6.5	2,733	2,754	2,824	2,843	2,914	2,937	2,991	3,549	3,867	4,151	4,237	4,250	4,631	4,752	6,395
Independent	Frankie Daly	4.8	2,034	2,090	2,163	2,272	2,304	2,573	2,624	2,677							
Aontú	Sarah Beasley	4.7	1,977	2,024	2,084	2,291	2,309	2,674	2,736	2,786	3,336	3,426	3,441	3,460			
Green	Brian Leddin	4.2	1,782	1,811	1,822	1,840	1,882	1,893	1,929								
Sinn Féin	Paul Gavan	3.3	1,378	1,392	1,423	1,459	1,543	1,564									
The Irish People	Dean Quinn	2.3	965	976	998	1,059	1,071										
PBP–Solidarity	Ruairí Fahy (Note: Fahy is a member of People Before Profit.)	1.7	720	729	787	807											
Independent Ireland	Esther Ahern	1.6	688	722	775												
Independent	Melanie Cleary	1.5	636	676													
Independent	Michelle Hayes	0.9	394														
Independent	Dean Lillis	0.3	132														
Electorate: 77,735 Valid: 42,174 Spoilt: 316 Quota: 8,435 Turnout: 54.7%

=== 2020 general election ===
2020 general election: Limerick City
Party	Candidate	FPv%	Count								
Party	Candidate	FPv%	1	2	3	4	5	6	7	8	9
Sinn Féin	Maurice Quinlivan	23.9	11,006								
Fianna Fáil	Willie O'Dea	19.9	9,198	9,460							
Fine Gael	Kieran O'Donnell	14.3	6,589	6,628	6,661	6,867	6,951	6,966	7,649	9,754	
Green	Brian Leddin	7.0	3,252	3,385	3,538	3,770	4,810	4,833	5,400	5,856	8,207
Independent	Frankie Daly	6.9	3,200	3,725	4,022	4,413	4,940	5,017	5,404	5,685	6,720
Fine Gael	Maria Byrne	6.5	2,998	3,021	3,042	3,135	3,253	3,266	3,671		
Fianna Fáil	James Collins	6.0	2,759	2,788	2,808	3,035	3,107	3,150			
Labour	Jan O'Sullivan	5.9	2,729	2,838	2,916	3,076	3,601	3,626	4,127	4,667	
Social Democrats	Jenny Blake	3.9	1,799	1,987	2,467	2,650					
Aontú	Michael Ryan	3.4	1,553	1,683	1,860						
Solidarity–PBP	Mary Cahillane (Note: Cahillane was a member of Solidarity.)	1.5	701	1,008							
National Party	Rebecca Barrett	0.7	345	380							
Electorate: 77,643 Valid: 46,129 Spoilt: 355 Quota: 9,226 Turnout: 46,484 (59.9%)

=== 2016 general election ===
2016 general election: Limerick City
Party	Candidate	FPv%	Count					
Party	Candidate	FPv%	1	2	3	4	5	6
Fianna Fáil	Willie O'Dea	27.8	12,999					
Fine Gael	Michael Noonan	15.6	7,294	7,909	8,221	8,591	9,018	9,311
Fine Gael	Kieran O'Donnell	12.9	6,047	6,545	6,830	7,177	7,512	7,849
Sinn Féin	Maurice Quinlivan	12.6	5,894	6,527	6,651	7,025	10,517	
Labour	Jan O'Sullivan	11.2	5,227	5,838	6,166	7,001	7,722	8,187
AAA–PBP	Cian Prendiville	9.8	4,584	5,244	5,496	6,724		
Social Democrats	Sarah Jane Hennelly	5.9	2,747	3,039	3,620			
Green	James Gaffney	2.1	964	1,081				
Catholic Democrats	Nora Bennis	1.4	673	823				
Independent	Desmond Hayes	0.5	254	314				
Independent	Denis Riordan	0.2	78	88				
Electorate: 75,568 Valid: 46,761 Spoilt: 357 (0.8%) Quota: 9,353 Turnout: 62.4%

=== 2011 general election ===
2011 general election: Limerick City
Party	Candidate	FPv%	Count						
Party	Candidate	FPv%	1	2	3	4	5	6	7
Fine Gael	Michael Noonan	30.8	13,291						
Fianna Fáil	Willie O'Dea	16.1	6,956	7,369	7,403	7,432	7,768	9,424	
Labour	Jan O'Sullivan	14.7	6,353	7,122	7,161	7,314	7,728	8,079	8,520
Fine Gael	Kieran O'Donnell	12.5	5,405	8,306	8,414	8,545	8,774		
Sinn Féin	Maurice Quinlivan	8.6	3,711	3,829	3,877	3,894	4,518	4,634	4,758
Labour	Joe Leddin	5.6	2,411	2,628	2,645	2,712	2,926	3,084	3,291
Fianna Fáil	Peter Power	5.3	2,303	2,399	2,429	2,466	2,533		
Independent	Kevin Kiely	2.6	1,129	1,200	1,270	1,306			
Socialist Party	Cian Prendiville (Note: Prendiville campaigned as a member of the United Left Alliance.)	1.7	721	740	769	799			
Green	Sheila Cahill	1.1	490	520	542				
Christian Solidarity	Conor O'Donoghue	0.4	186	197					
Independent	Denis Riordan	0.4	173	178					
Independent	Matt Larkin	0.1	59	62					
Electorate: 64,909 Valid: 43,188 Spoilt: 429 (1.0%) Quota: 8,638 Turnout: 43,617 (67.2%)

== See also ==
- Dáil constituencies
- Elections in the Republic of Ireland
- Politics of the Republic of Ireland
- List of Dáil by-elections
- List of political parties in the Republic of Ireland
