= Limerick East (Dáil constituency) =

Dáil constituency (1948–2011)

- Former Dáil constituency

Former constituency
- Created: 1948
- Abolished: 2011
- Seats: 4 (1948–1981); 5 (1981–2011)
- Local government areas: Limerick City; County Limerick; County Clare
- Created from: Limerick
- Replaced by: Limerick City; Limerick

Limerick East was a parliamentary constituency represented in Dáil Éireann, the lower house of the Irish parliament or Oireachtas from 1948 to 2011. The method of election was proportional representation by means of the single transferable vote (PR-STV).

== History and boundaries ==
The constituency was created under the Electoral (Amendment) Act 1947 and first used at the 1948 general election. It succeeded the constituency of Limerick, which was divided between Limerick East and Limerick West.

At its abolition, it encompassed the whole of Limerick City, together with the Castleconnell electoral area part of the Bruff electoral area of County Limerick and the Ballyglass electoral division in County Clare.

The constituency elected 4 deputies (Teachtaí Dála, commonly known as TDs) from 1948 to 1981, and 5 deputies from 1981 to 2011.

While support for left-wing parties has been traditionally strong in the city of Limerick, the constituency also elected at least one Progressive Democrats TD in all general elections from 1987 until 2007.

The Constituency Commission published its final recommendations on 23 October 2007. As a result of population decline, Limerick East was replaced by a 4-seat Limerick City constituency at the 2011 general election. Most of the rural parts of Limerick East were transferred to the new Limerick constituency.

Limerick East – Constituency boundaries

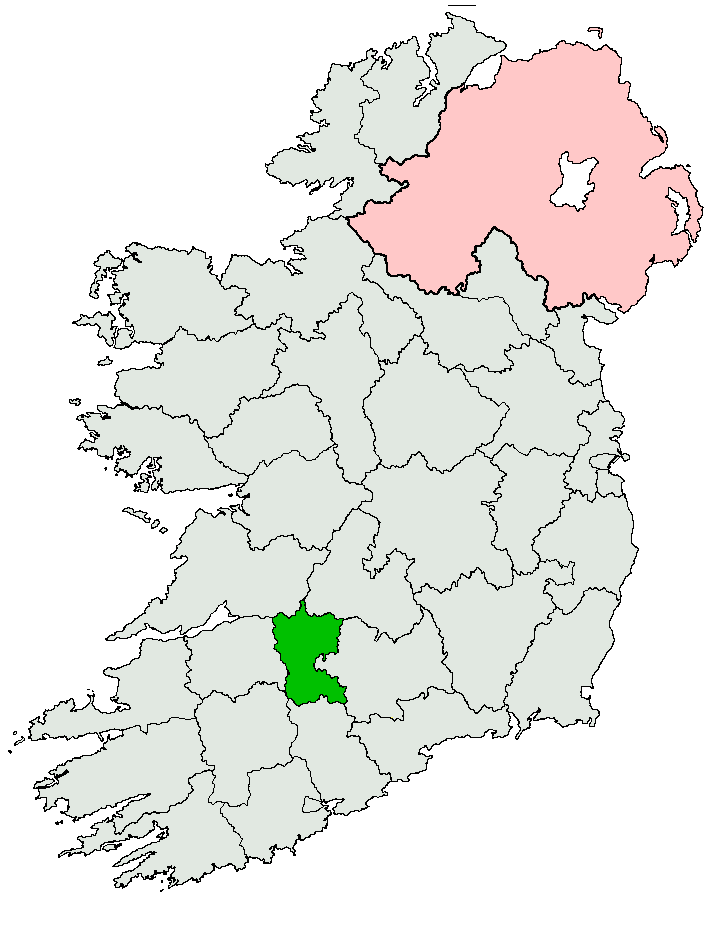
1948–1961

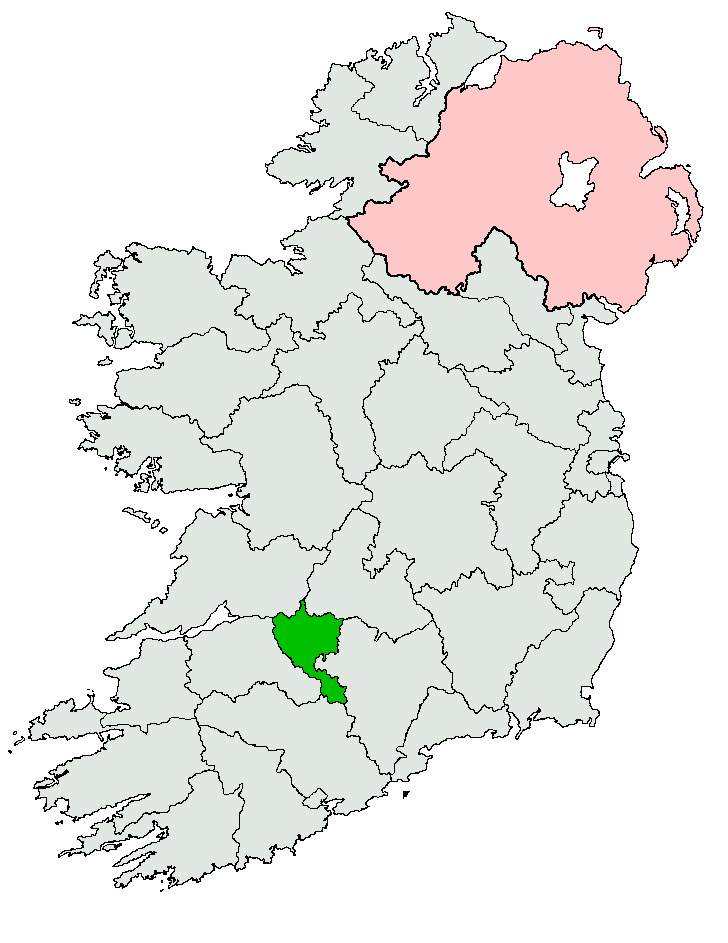
1961–1969

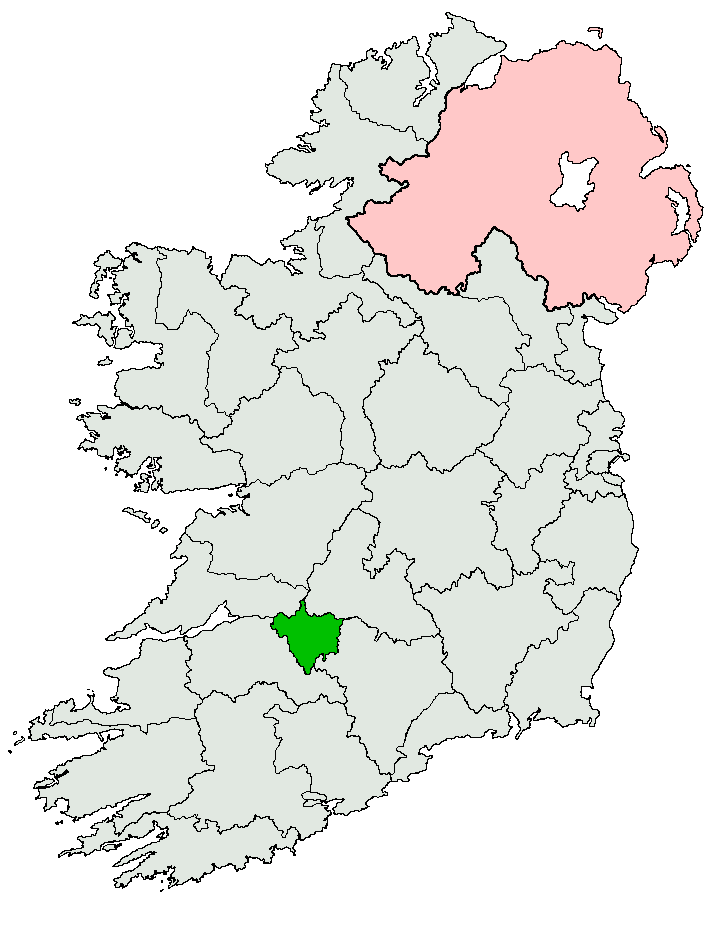
1969–1981

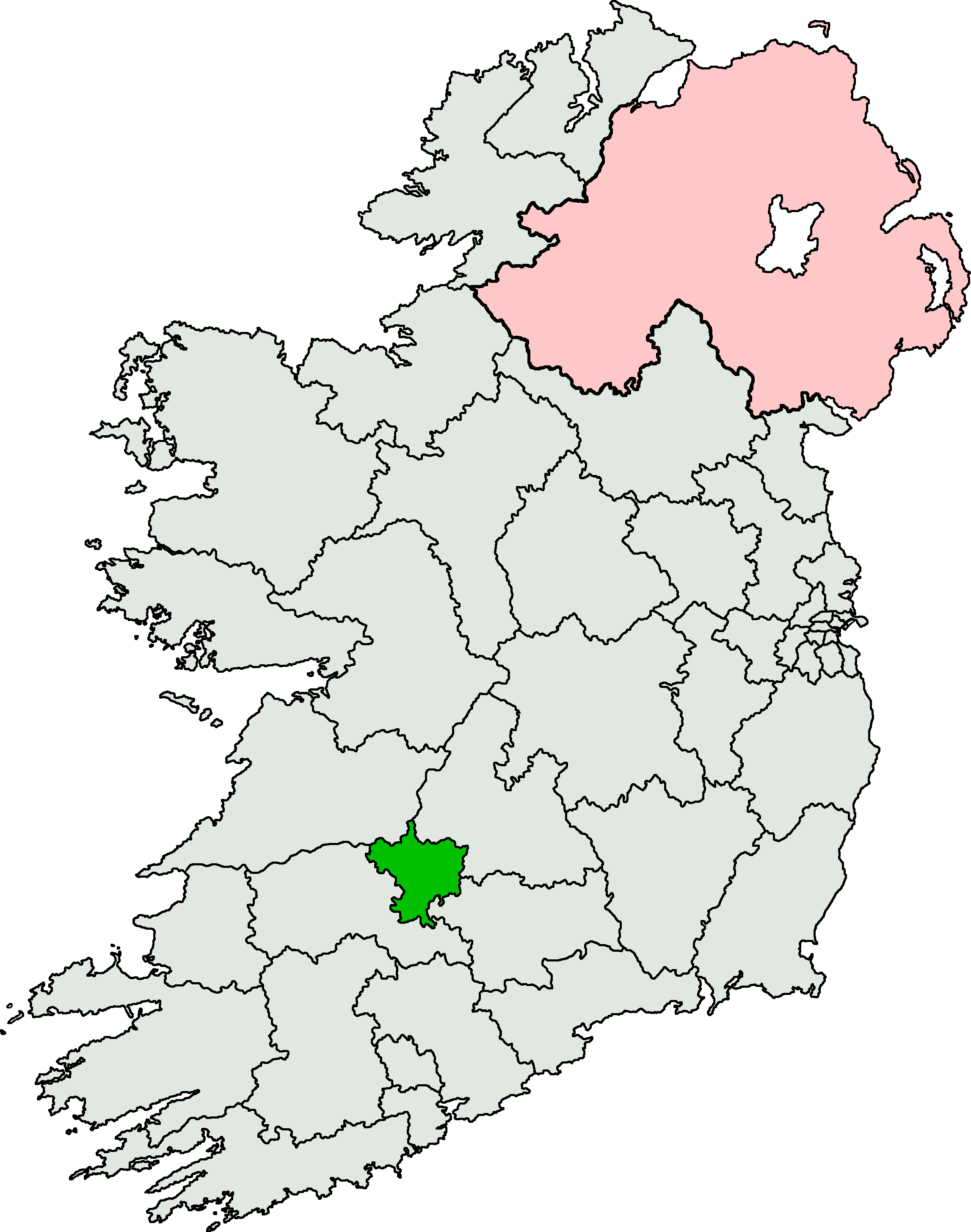
1981–2011

Changes to the Limerick East constituency 1948–2011
Years	TDs	Boundaries	Notes
1948–1961	4	The county borough of Limerick, and that part of County Limerick not in Limerick West	Created from Limerick.
1961–1969	4	The county borough of Limerick, and in County Limerick The district electoral divisions of: Fedamore, Grange, Kilpeacon, Rathmore, in the former Rural District of Croom; Bruff, Cahercorney, Glenbrohane, Hospital, Kilteely, Knockainy, Knocklong, Uregare, in the former Rural District of Kilmallock; Abington, Ballybricken, Ballysimon, Ballyvarra, Caherconlish East, Caherconlish West, Caherelly, Cappamore, Castleconnell, Clonkeen, Doon West, Glenstal, Kilmurry, Limerick North Rural, Limerick South Rural, Roxborough, in the former Rural District of Limerick No. 1; Anglesborough, Ballylanders, Cullane, Duntryleague, Galbally, Kilbeheny, Kilglass, Knocknascrow, Riversdale, in the former Rural District of Mitchelstown No. 2; Bilboa, Doon South, Grean, Oola, Templebredon in the former Rural District of Tipperary No. 2.	
1969–1981	4	The county borough of Limerick, and in County Limerick The district electoral divisions of: Fedamore, Grange, Kilpeacon, Rathmore, in the former Rural District of Croom; Bruff, Cahercorney, Hospital, Kilteely, Knockainy, Knocklong, Uregare, in the former Rural District of Kilmallock; Abington, Ballybricken, Ballysimon, Ballyvarra, Caherconlish East, Caherconlish West, Caherelly, Cappamore, Castleconnell, Clonkeen, Doon West, Glenstal, Kilmurry, Limerick North Rural, Limerick South Rural, Roxborough, in the former Rural District of Limerick No. 1; Bilboa, Doon South, Grean, Oola, Templebredon, in the former Rural District of Tipperary No. 2.	
1981–1992	5	The county borough of Limerick, and in County Limerick The district electoral divisions of: Fedamore, Grange, Kilpeacon, Rathmore, in the former Rural District of Croom; Bruff, Cahercorney, Hospital, Kilteely, Knockainy, Knocklong, Uregare, in the former Rural District of Kilmallock; Abington, Ballybricken, Ballysimon, Ballyvarra, Caherconlish East, Caherconlish West, Caherelly, Cappamore, Castleconnell, Clonkeen, Doon West, Glenstal, Kilmurry, Limerick North Rural, Limerick South Rural, Roxborough, in the former Rural District of Limerick No. 1; Bilboa, Doon South, Grean, Oola, Templebredon, in the former Rural District of Tipperary No. 2.	Transfer of Ballycummin from Limerick West.
1992–2002	5	The county borough of Limerick, in County Limerick The district electoral divisions of: Fedamore, Grange, Kilpeacon, Rathmore, in the former Rural District of Croom; Bruff, Cahercorney, Hospital, Kilteely, Knockainy, Knocklong, Uregare, in the former Rural District of Kilmallock; Abington, Ballybricken, Ballycummin, Ballysimon, Ballyvarra, Caherconlish East, Caherconlish West, Caherelly, Cappamore, Castleconnell, Clonkeen, Doon West, Glenstal, Kilmurry, Limerick North Rural, Limerick South Rural, Roxborough, in the former Rural District of Limerick No. 1; Bilboa, Doon South, Grean, Oola, Templebredon, in the former Rural District of Tipperary No. 2; and in County Clare the townlands of Athlunkard, Ballykeelaun, Cloonoughter, Fairyhill, Garraun, Gortatogher, Kilquane, Knockballynameath, Parteen, Quinspool South, Rosmadda East, Rosmadda West, St. Thomas' Island, Shannakyle, in the district electoral division of Ballyglass, in the former Rural District of Meelick.	Transfer of territory from Clare
2002–2007	5	The city of Limerick, in County Limerick The electoral divisions of: Bruff, Cahercorney, Hospital, Kilteely, Knockainy, Knocklong, Uregare, in the former Rural District of Kilmallock; Abington, Ballybricken, Ballycummin, Ballysimon, Ballyvarra, Caherconlish East, Caherconlish West, Caherelly, Cappamore, Castleconnell, Clonkeen, Doon West, Glenstal, Kilmurry, Limerick North Rural, Limerick South Rural, Roxborough, in the former Rural District of Limerick No. 1; Bilboa, Doon South, Grean, Oola, Templebredon, in the former Rural District of Tipperary No. 2; and in County Clare the townlands of Athlunkard, Ballykeelaun, Cloonoughter, Fairyhill, Garraun, Gortatogher, Kilquane, Knockballynameath, Parteen, Quinspool South, Rosmadda East, Rosmadda West, St. Thomas' Island, Shannakyle, in the electoral division of Ballyglass, in the former Rural District of Meelick.	Transfer of Croom area to Limerick West
2007–2011	5	The city of Limerick, in County Limerick The electoral divisions of: Cahercorney, Hospital, Kilteely, in the former Rural District of Kilmallock; Abington, Ballybricken, Ballycummin, Ballysimon, Ballyvarra, Caherconlish East, Caherconlish West, Caherelly, Cappamore, Castleconnell, Clonkeen, Doon West, Glenstal, Kilmurry, Limerick North Rural, Limerick South Rural, Roxborough, in the former Rural District of Limerick No. 1; Bilboa, Doon South, Grean, Oola, Templebredon, in the former Rural District of Tipperary No. 2; and in County Clare the electoral division of Ballyglass, in the former Rural District of Meelick.	Transfer from Clare of Ballyglass, Blackwater, Castlebank, Drummin, Lakyle, Parkroe, Quinspool North, Reanabrone, Glenlon North, Glenlon South, Illaunaroan and 7 other islands on the River Shannon, in the former Rural District of Meelick, and Transfer to Limerick West of Bruff, Uregare, Knockainy, Knocklong, in the former Rural District of Kilmallock.
2011	—	Constituency abolished	Greater part of constituency renamed as Limerick City, with transfer to Limerick of Cahercorney, Hospital, Kilteely, in the former Rural District of Kilmallock, Abington, Ballybricken, Caherconlish East, Caherconlish West, Caherelly, Cappamore, Clonkeen, Doon West, Glenstal, Kilmurry, Roxborough, in the former Rural District of Limerick No. 1, Bilboa, Doon South, Grean, Oola, Templebredon, in the former Rural District of Tipperary No. 1.

== TDs ==
Teachtaí Dála (TDs) for Limerick East 1948–2011
Key to parties: DSP = Democratic Socialist; FF = Fianna Fáil; FG = Fine Gael; Ind. = Independent; Lab = Labour; PDs = Progressive Democrats
Dáil	Election	Deputy (Party)	Deputy (Party)	Deputy (Party)	Deputy (Party)	Deputy (Party)
13th	1948	Michael Keyes (Lab)	Robert Ryan (FF)	James Reidy (FG)	Daniel Bourke (FF)	4 seats 1948–1981
14th	1951	Michael Keyes (Lab)	Tadhg Crowley (FF)	James Reidy (FG)	Daniel Bourke (FF)	4 seats 1948–1981
14th	1952 by-election	Michael Keyes (Lab)	Tadhg Crowley (FF)	James Reidy (FG)	John Carew (FG)	4 seats 1948–1981
15th	1954	Michael Keyes (Lab)	Tadhg Crowley (FF)	Donogh O'Malley (FF)	John Carew (FG)	4 seats 1948–1981
16th	1957	Ted Russell (Ind.)	Paddy Clohessy (FF)	Donogh O'Malley (FF)	John Carew (FG)	4 seats 1948–1981
17th	1961	Stephen Coughlan (Lab)	Paddy Clohessy (FF)	Donogh O'Malley (FF)	Tom O'Donnell (FG)	4 seats 1948–1981
18th	1965	Stephen Coughlan (Lab)	Paddy Clohessy (FF)	Donogh O'Malley (FF)	Tom O'Donnell (FG)	4 seats 1948–1981
18th	1968 by-election	Stephen Coughlan (Lab)	Paddy Clohessy (FF)	Desmond O'Malley (FF)	Tom O'Donnell (FG)	4 seats 1948–1981
19th	1969	Stephen Coughlan (Lab)	Michael Herbert (FF)	Desmond O'Malley (FF)	Tom O'Donnell (FG)	4 seats 1948–1981
20th	1973	Stephen Coughlan (Lab)	Michael Herbert (FF)	Desmond O'Malley (FF)	Tom O'Donnell (FG)	4 seats 1948–1981
21st	1977	Michael Lipper (Ind.)	Michael Herbert (FF)	Desmond O'Malley (FF)	Tom O'Donnell (FG)	4 seats 1948–1981
22nd	1981	Jim Kemmy (Ind.)	Peadar Clohessy (FF)	Desmond O'Malley (FF)	Tom O'Donnell (FG)	Michael Noonan (FG)
23rd	1982 (Feb)	Jim Kemmy (DSP)	Willie O'Dea (FF)	Desmond O'Malley (FF)	Tom O'Donnell (FG)	Michael Noonan (FG)
24th	1982 (Nov)	Frank Prendergast (Lab)	Willie O'Dea (FF)	Desmond O'Malley (FF)	Tom O'Donnell (FG)	Michael Noonan (FG)
25th	1987	Jim Kemmy (DSP)	Willie O'Dea (FF)	Desmond O'Malley (PDs)	Peadar Clohessy (PDs)	Michael Noonan (FG)
26th	1989	Jim Kemmy (DSP)	Willie O'Dea (FF)	Desmond O'Malley (PDs)	Peadar Clohessy (PDs)	Michael Noonan (FG)
27th	1992	Jim Kemmy (Lab)	Willie O'Dea (FF)	Desmond O'Malley (PDs)	Peadar Clohessy (PDs)	Michael Noonan (FG)
28th	1997	Jim Kemmy (Lab)	Willie O'Dea (FF)	Desmond O'Malley (PDs)	Eddie Wade (FF)	Michael Noonan (FG)
28th	1998 by-election	Jan O'Sullivan (Lab)	Willie O'Dea (FF)	Desmond O'Malley (PDs)	Eddie Wade (FF)	Michael Noonan (FG)
29th	2002	Jan O'Sullivan (Lab)	Willie O'Dea (FF)	Tim O'Malley (PDs)	Peter Power (FF)	Michael Noonan (FG)
30th	2007	Jan O'Sullivan (Lab)	Willie O'Dea (FF)	Kieran O'Donnell (FG)	Peter Power (FF)	Michael Noonan (FG)
31st	2011	Constituency abolished. See Limerick City and Limerick				

Note: The columns in this table are used only for presentational purposes, and no significance should be attached to the order of columns. For details of the order in which seats were won at each election, see the detailed results of that election.

== Elections ==
*: Outgoing TD

=== 2007 general election ===
2007 general election: Limerick East
Party	Candidate	FPv%	Count							
Party	Candidate	FPv%	1	2	3	4	5	6	7	8
Fianna Fáil	Willie O'Dea	38.6	19,082							
Fine Gael	Michael Noonan	15.2	7,507	8,484						
Labour	Jan O'Sullivan	10.3	5,098	6,236	6,271	6,352	6,556	7,236	8,114	9,051
Fine Gael	Kieran O'Donnell	10.3	5,094	5,566	5,584	5,644	5,816	6,148	6,498	6,966
Fianna Fáil	Peter Power	7.2	3,569	8,669						
Progressive Democrats	Tim O'Malley	6.8	3,354	4,211	4,268	4,308	4,387	4,526	4,670	5,776
Sinn Féin	Maurice Quinlivan	4.2	2,081	2,480	2,494	2,513	2,686	2,839		
Fianna Fáil	Noreen Ryan	2.8	1,391	2,943	3,245	3,278	3,419	3,536	4,110	
Green	Trish Forde Brennan	2.6	1,296	1,420	1,425	1,432	1,619			
Independent	John Devane	0.7	330	457	461	469				
Independent	Cathal McCarthy	0.4	188	232	233	236				
Independent	Denis Riordan	0.4	186	207	209	210				
Christian Solidarity	Conor O'Donoghue	0.4	171	202	203	205				
Independent	Patrick Moore	0.1	28	38						
Electorate: 76,874 Valid: 49,375 Spoilt: 431 (0.9%) Quota: 8,230 Turnout: 49,806 (64.8%)

=== 2002 general election ===
2002 general election: Limerick East
Party	Candidate	FPv%	Count										
Party	Candidate	FPv%	1	2	3	4	5	6	7	8	9	10	11
Fianna Fáil	Willie O'Dea	26.3	13,174										
Fine Gael	Michael Noonan	18.9	9,451										
Progressive Democrats	Tim O'Malley	9.8	4,885	5,327	5,415	5,490	5,506	5,631	5,782	5,872	6,324	6,953	7,723
Labour	Jan O'Sullivan	9.3	4,629	5,048	5,193	5,255	5,356	5,715	5,927	6,323	6,958	7,256	7,467
Fine Gael	Mary Jackman	8.9	4,468	4,712	5,409	5,497	5,529	5,657	5,842	5,979	6,569	6,986	7,162
Fianna Fáil	Peter Power	7.8	3,881	5,838	5,879	5,969	6,007	6,080	6,253	6,425	6,851	9,491	
Fianna Fáil	Eddie Wade	5.8	2,918	4,029	4,042	4,084	4,105	4,134	4,266	4,323	4,529		
Independent	Patrick Kennedy	4.2	2,092	2,313	2,366	2,434	2,567	2,650	2,840	3,379			
Independent	John Gilligan	2.3	1,176	1,315	1,333	1,379	1,576	1,680	1,920				
Ind. Health Alliance	Tom Ryan	2.3	1,148	1,269	1,289	1,361	1,405	1,478					
Green	Timothy Hourigan	1.8	917	970	985	1,053	1,077						
Independent	Michael Kelly	1.3	677	736	751	764							
National Party	Nora Bennis	1.0	479	536	545								
Christian Solidarity	Conor O'Donoghue	0.2	86	95	96								
Independent	Aidan Ryan	0.1	19	27	29								
Electorate: 80,593 Valid: 50,000 Spoilt: 513 (1.0%) Quota: 8,334 Turnout: 50,513 (62.7%)

=== 1998 by-election ===
Following the death of Labour Party TD Jim Kemmy, a by-election was held on 11 March 1998. The seat was won by the Labour Party candidate Jan O'Sullivan.

1998 by-election: Limerick East
Party	Candidate	FPv%	Count				
Party	Candidate	FPv%	1	2	3	4	5
Labour	Jan O'Sullivan	24.9	10,619	11,444	13,724	14,967	22,888
Fine Gael	Mary Jackman	24.5	10,445	10,870	11,591	12,860	
Fianna Fáil	Sandra Marsh	23.8	10,173	10,852	11,328	13,117	15,188
Progressive Democrats	Tim O'Malley	10.0	4,287	4,578	4,913		
Democratic Left	John Ryan	9.1	3,868	4,507			
Sinn Féin	Jenny Marie Shapland	2.1	909				
Independent	John Gilligan	2.0	850				
National Party	Nora Bennis	1.6	700				
Green	Eric Sheppard	1.3	546				
Independent	Barney Sheehan	0.5	198				
Independent	Noel Hannon	0.3	108				
Electorate: 78,062 Valid: 42,703 Quota: 21,352 Turnout: (54.7%)

=== 1997 general election ===
1997 general election: Limerick East
Party	Candidate	FPv%	Count										
Party	Candidate	FPv%	1	2	3	4	5	6	7	8	9	10	11
Fianna Fáil	Willie O'Dea	25.3	12,581										
Fine Gael	Michael Noonan	20.3	10,092										
Fianna Fáil	Eddie Wade	9.7	4,798	6,600	6,655	6,768	7,034	7,360	7,451	9,632			
Progressive Democrats	Desmond O'Malley	8.8	4,358	4,836	4,981	5,063	5,278	6,561	6,714	7,478	8,419		
Democratic Left	John Ryan	6.9	3,403	3,682	3,809	3,994	4,092	4,129	4,562	4,756	4,873	4,904	
Fine Gael	Mary Jackman	6.2	3,084	3,209	4,208	4,327	4,599	4,755	5,106	5,330	5,459	5,519	6,499
Labour	Jim Kemmy	5.4	2,702	2,933	3,153	3,329	3,439	3,509	4,625	4,875	5,003	5,047	7,173
Fianna Fáil	Peter Power	4.8	2,362	3,340	3,393	3,483	3,784	3,903	3,993				
Labour	Jan O'Sullivan	3.8	1,866	1,984	2,115	2,292	2,353	2,383					
Progressive Democrats	Edmond Creighton	3.7	1,817	1,959	1,988	2,021	2,150						
National Party	Nora Bennis	3.1	1,533	1,610	1,637	1,730							
Green	Eric Sheppard	1.6	802	843	858								
Independent	Noel Raymond Hannan	0.4	195	217	222								
Independent	Denis Riordan	0.2	108	112	114								
Electorate: 76,705 Valid: 49,701 Spoilt: 348 (0.7%) Quota: 8,284 Turnout: 50,049 (65.3%)

=== 1992 general election ===
1992 general election: Limerick East
Party	Candidate	FPv%	Count											
Party	Candidate	FPv%	1	2	3	4	5	6	7	8	9	10	11	12
Fianna Fáil	Willie O'Dea	22.7	10,990											
Progressive Democrats	Desmond O'Malley	17.2	8,304											
Labour	Jim Kemmy	17.1	8,262											
Fine Gael	Michael Noonan	11.2	5,437	5,650	5,664	5,697	5,715	5,725	5,792	5,829	5,936	7,379	8,627	
Progressive Democrats	Peadar Clohessy	9.0	4,334	4,607	4,631	4,804	4,814	4,847	4,885	4,912	4,996	5,322	6,175	6,630
Fianna Fáil	Eddie Wade	7.5	3,637	5,605	5,617	5,625	5,630	5,685	5,782	5,840	5,941	6,060	6,435	6,548
Labour	Jan O'Sullivan	6.4	3,091	3,308	3,320	3,336	3,484	3,528	3,566	3,726	4,099	4,353		
Fine Gael	Mary Jackman	6.2	2,110	2,196	2,197	2,207	2,214	2,221	2,253	2,276	2,324			
Democratic Left	John Ryan	1.7	835	919	940	942	949	989	1,017	1,130				
Independent	Augustine Moore	1.0	463	477	481	481	482	496						
Sinn Féin	Tom Clancy	0.8	400	422	425	426	427							
People's Democracy	Joe Harrington	0.8	370	413	420	422	428	576	601					
Independent	Jude Williams	0.2	118	129										
Electorate: 71,136 Valid: 48,351 Spoilt: 721 (1.5%) Quota: 8,059 Turnout: 49,072 (69.0%)

=== 1989 general election ===
1989 general election: Limerick East
Party	Candidate	FPv%	Count							
Party	Candidate	FPv%	1	2	3	4	5	6	7	8
Fianna Fáil	Willie O'Dea	20.8	9,658							
Democratic Socialist	Jim Kemmy	19.8	9,168							
Progressive Democrats	Desmond O'Malley	18.1	8,385							
Fine Gael	Michael Noonan	12.5	5,805	5,936	6,286	6,590	6,714	6,937	9,124	
Progressive Democrats	Peadar Clohessy	9.1	4,233	4,420	4,769	5,047	5,507	5,709	6,266	7,517
Fianna Fáil	Eddie Wade	6.6	3,073	4,030	4,097	4,179	4,195	6,240	6,396	6,545
Fine Gael	Mary Jackman	5.9	2,715	2,794	2,929	3,122	3,168	3,309		
Fianna Fáil	Tony Bromell	5.0	2,298	2,829	2,926	3,010	3,025			
Labour	Declan Leddin	2.2	1,006	1,055	1,501					
Electorate: 66,471 Valid: 46,341 Spoilt: 499 (1.1%) Quota: 7,724 Turnout: 46,840 (70.5%)

=== 1987 general election ===
1987 general election: Limerick East
Party	Candidate	FPv%	Count												
Party	Candidate	FPv%	1	2	3	4	5	6	7	8	9	10	11	12	13
Progressive Democrats	Desmond O'Malley	24.9	12,358												
Fianna Fáil	Willie O'Dea	18.7	9,268												
Progressive Democrats	Peadar Clohessy	12.2	6,069	9,101											
Democratic Socialist	Jim Kemmy	11.9	5,920	6,228	6,309	6,529	6,544	6,556	6,654	6,807	6,966	7,240	7,387	8,412	
Fine Gael	Michael Noonan	11.9	5,913	6,217	6,256	6,510	6,513	6,536	6,573	6,596	6,633	6,648	6,727	7,303	10,122
Fine Gael	Tom O'Donnell	6.0	2,968	3,126	3,179	3,305	3,312	3,326	3,335	3,340	3,384	3,401	3,463	3,520	
Labour	Frank Prendergast	4.4	2,201	2,311	2,349	2,462	2,470	2,475	2,507	2,531	2,581	2,633	2,707		
Fianna Fáil	Richard O'Flaherty	4.3	2,111	2,185	2,722	2,763	2,764	2,771	2,784	2,792	2,835	2,962	4,117	4,423	4,687
Fianna Fáil	Michael Parkes	2.5	1,254	1,317	1,545	1,580	1,582	1,586	1,595	1,596	1,615	1,657			
Sinn Féin	Pádraig Malone	1.1	565	572	579	582	587	587	595	619	664				
Independent	Martin Nugent	0.7	353	371	381	402	405	412	437	463					
Workers' Party	Fergal Grant	0.5	246	253	255	262	273	276	295						
Green	Declan O'Lehane	0.5	241	247	250	257	260	264							
Independent	Denis Riordan	0.2	87	89	89	91	92								
Independent	John Donovan	0.1	59	59	60	63									
Electorate: 67,301 Valid: 49,613 Quota: 8,269 Turnout: 73.7%

=== November 1982 general election ===
November 1982 general election: Limerick East
Party	Candidate	FPv%	Count								
Party	Candidate	FPv%	1	2	3	4	5	6	7	8	9
Fianna Fáil	Desmond O'Malley	22.5	10,615								
Fine Gael	Tom O'Donnell	19.2	9,058								
Fianna Fáil	Willie O'Dea	15.5	7,306	8,893							
Fine Gael	Michael Noonan	11.9	5,631	5,740	6,548	6,589	6,610	6,646	6,682	7,910	
Labour	Frank Prendergast	10.2	4,793	4,927	5,009	5,075	5,112	5,160	5,217	5,381	7,892
Democratic Socialist	Jim Kemmy	8.7	4,125	4,239	4,314	4,353	4,400	4,438	4,508	4,580	
Fianna Fáil	Michael Herbert	6.8	3,204	3,762	3,788	4,396	4,400	4,424	5,494	5,546	6,028
Fine Gael	John O'Sullivan	2.8	1,308	1,340	1,526	1,535	1,541	1,551	1,570		
Fianna Fáil	John Bourke	1.8	859	1,059	1,065	1,319	1,328	1,350			
Independent	Richard Power	0.4	177	182	184	186	198				
Independent	Patrick Moore	0.3	145	150	152	155					
Electorate: 64,982 Valid: 47,221 Quota: 7,871 Turnout: 72.7%

=== February 1982 general election ===
February 1982 general election: Limerick East
Party	Candidate	FPv%	Count									
Party	Candidate	FPv%	1	2	3	4	5	6	7	8	9	10
Fianna Fáil	Desmond O'Malley	19.1	9,049									
Fine Gael	Tom O'Donnell	18.0	8,514									
Fianna Fáil	Willie O'Dea	15.7	7,425	8,105								
Democratic Socialist	Jim Kemmy	13.7	6,502	6,565	6,619	6,628	6,660	6,742	6,902	7,195	7,438	8,597
Fianna Fáil	Peadar Clohessy	10.5	4,947	5,289	5,310	5,500	5,511	5,556	5,603	5,715	5,812	6,093
Fine Gael	Michael Noonan	9.6	4,527	4,555	4,943	4,949	4,952	4,966	5,067	5,163	6,687	7,861
Labour	Michael Lipper	5.7	2,684	2,700	2,730	2,735	2,753	2,835	2,914	3,086	3,297	
Fine Gael	Patrick Kennedy	4.1	1,938	1,949	2,064	2,066	2,079	2,093	2,146	2,234		
Independent	John Frawley	1.4	676	684	689	689	706	807	914			
Independent	Win Harrington	1.1	516	524	532	533	545	581				
Irish Republican Socialist	John Gilligan	0.7	343	345	347	348	448					
Independent	Joseph Harrington	0.5	215	216	217	218						
Electorate: 63,737 Valid: 47,336 Quota: 7,890 Turnout: 74.3%

=== 1981 general election ===
1981 general election: Limerick East
Party	Candidate	FPv%	Count								
Party	Candidate	FPv%	1	2	3	4	5	6	7	8	9
Fine Gael	Tom O'Donnell	20.4	9,915								
Fianna Fáil	Desmond O'Malley	19.2	9,346								
Fianna Fáil	Peadar Clohessy	10.8	5,256	5,295	5,724	5,788	5,847	6,864	6,976	7,192	7,511
Fine Gael	Michael Noonan	8.9	4,311	5,232	5,268	5,312	5,422	5,594	7,653	8,491	
Fianna Fáil	Willie O'Dea	8.8	4,297	4,364	4,713	4,791	4,824	5,375	5,530	5,750	5,985
Democratic Socialist	Jim Kemmy	8.6	4,190	4,293	4,338	4,482	4,742	4,831	4,921	5,644	7,976
Labour	Michael Lipper	6.0	2,905	2,996	3,022	3,170	3,337	3,395	3,502	4,757	
Labour	Frank Prendergast	5.8	2,840	2,970	3,026	3,100	3,251	3,351	3,460		
Fine Gael	Richard Hourigan	4.5	2,184	2,591	2,605	2,623	2,685	2,744			
Fianna Fáil	Éamonn Cregan	3.4	1,636	1,657	1,930	1,994	2,072				
Independent	John Frawley	1.8	866	891	904	1,038					
Independent	Joseph Harrington	1.7	844	856	862						
Electorate: 63,737 Valid: 48,590 Quota: 8,099 Turnout: 76.2%

=== 1977 general election ===
1977 general election: Limerick East
Party	Candidate	FPv%	Count									
Party	Candidate	FPv%	1	2	3	4	5	6	7	8	9	10
Fianna Fáil	Desmond O'Malley	19.5	8,762	8,765	8,788	8,860	8,900	8,994				
Fine Gael	Tom O'Donnell	14.6	6,571	6,573	6,585	6,692	7,302	7,374	7,636	10,169		
Fianna Fáil	Michael Herbert	14.0	6,293	6,306	6,321	6,377	6,405	6,474	6,640	6,786	7,105	7,342
Fianna Fáil	Peadar Clohessy	12.2	5,488	5,497	5,512	5,540	5,572	5,610	5,722	5,778	6,090	6,249
Independent	Michael Lipper	11.6	5,224	5,257	5,322	5,429	5,575	6,023	7,608	8,049	9,775	
Labour	Stephen Coughlan	7.9	3,553	3,555	3,565	3,618	3,693	3,786	4,008	4,380		
Fine Gael	Ted Russell	6.7	3,022	3,024	3,030	3,097	3,403	3,521	3,684			
Democratic Socialist	Jim Kemmy	5.2	2,333	2,348	2,413	2,476	2,530	2,920				
Independent	Michael Crowe	2.9	1,325	1,335	1,358	1,408	1,447					
Fine Gael	Patrick Kennedy	2.9	1,302	1,303	1,307	1,357						
Independent	Win Harrington	1.4	646	657	677							
Sinn Féin The Workers' Party	Fergus Reynolds	0.6	262	280								
Independent	Joseph Harrington	0.3	122									
Electorate: 57,023 Valid: 44,903 Spoilt: 217 (0.5%) Quota: 8,981 Turnout: 45,120 (79.1%)

=== 1973 general election ===
1973 general election: Limerick East
Party	Candidate	FPv%	Count					
Party	Candidate	FPv%	1	2	3	4	5	6
Fianna Fáil	Desmond O'Malley	21.0	7,806					
Fine Gael	Tom O'Donnell	18.4	6,841	6,853	7,916			
Labour	Stephen Coughlan	14.8	5,495	5,508	5,824	5,898	6,174	8,999
Fianna Fáil	Michael Herbert	12.2	4,532	4,758	4,806	4,812	7,573	
Fine Gael	Ted Russell	9.5	3,523	3,530	4,211	4,571	4,653	5,210
Labour	Michael Lipper	8.9	3,292	3,296	3,566	3,602	3,665	
Fianna Fáil	Peadar Clohessy	8.7	3,242	3,344	3,387	3,389		
Fine Gael	Patrick Kennedy	6.6	2,456	2,460				
Electorate: 47,001 Valid: 37,187 Quota: 7,438 Turnout: 79.1%

=== 1969 general election ===
1969 general election: Limerick East
Party	Candidate	FPv%	Count						
Party	Candidate	FPv%	1	2	3	4	5	6	7
Fine Gael	Tom O'Donnell	17.9	6,438	6,457	6,616	7,926			
Labour	Stephen Coughlan	17.7	6,362	6,474	6,579	6,792	7,059	7,189	
Fianna Fáil	Desmond O'Malley	16.6	5,960	5,972	5,984	6,029	6,062	6,916	7,142
Fianna Fáil	Michael Herbert	13.9	4,985	4,993	5,016	5,060	5,080	6,415	6,635
Independent	Hilda O'Malley	9.4	3,361	3,411	3,439	3,658	4,010	4,352	5,543
Labour	Michael Lipper	9.0	3,222	3,353	3,365	3,478	3,538	3,649	
Fianna Fáil	Liam Hickey	7.9	2,838	2,845	2,857	2,885	2,896		
Fine Gael	Patrick Kennedy	5.1	1,821	1,839	2,038				
Fine Gael	Patrick Clancy	1.5	560	565					
Labour	Anthony Pratschke	1.0	366						
Electorate: 44,859 Valid: 35,913 Quota: 7,183 Turnout: 80.1%

=== 1968 by-election ===
Following the death of Fianna Fáil TD Donogh O'Malley, a by-election was held on 22 May 1968. The seat was won by the Fianna Fáil candidate Desmond O'Malley, nephew of the deceased TD.

1968 by-election: Limerick East
Party	Candidate	FPv%	Count		
Party	Candidate	FPv%	1	2	3
Fianna Fáil	Desmond O'Malley	43.7	16,638	16,828	18,447
Labour	Michael Lipper	26.7	10,151	10,760	17,520
Fine Gael	James F. O'Higgins	26.4	10,039	10,335	
Liberal	Mick B. Crowe	3.2	1,209		
Electorate: 46,798 Valid: 38,037 Quota: 19,019 Turnout: 81.3%

=== 1965 general election ===
1965 general election: Limerick East
Party	Candidate	FPv%	Count				
Party	Candidate	FPv%	1	2	3	4	5
Fianna Fáil	Donogh O'Malley	29.1	10,285				
Fine Gael	Tom O'Donnell	17.7	6,253	6,368	6,682	9,686	
Labour	Stephen Coughlan	15.9	5,623	5,839	5,879	6,612	7,729
Fianna Fáil	Paddy Clohessy	13.6	4,812	6,071	6,099	6,249	6,378
Fine Gael	Ted Russell	11.4	4,025	4,193	4,283		
Fianna Fáil	Michael Herbert	10.8	3,804	5,243	5,275	5,452	5,709
Fine Gael	James Hickey	1.4	500	527			
Electorate: 45,607 Valid: 35,302 Quota: 7,061 Turnout: 77.4%

=== 1961 general election ===
1961 general election: Limerick East
Party	Candidate	FPv%	Count						
Party	Candidate	FPv%	1	2	3	4	5	6	7
Fianna Fáil	Donogh O'Malley	26.2	8,622						
Labour	Stephen Coughlan	21.1	6,964						
Fianna Fáil	Paddy Clohessy	14.6	4,827	6,022	6,139	7,485			
Independent	Ted Russell	10.8	3,547	3,838	3,949	4,133	4,337	4,612	5,566
Fine Gael	Tom O'Donnell	10.2	3,367	3,415	3,784	3,869	3,941	3,995	6,378
Fine Gael	John Carew	10.0	3,288	3,364	3,682	3,724	3,819	3,874	
Fianna Fáil	William Slattery	4.2	1,388	1,773	1,789				
Fine Gael	John Kirby	2.9	958	992					
Electorate: 43,769 Valid: 32,961 Quota: 6,593 Turnout: 75.3%

=== 1957 general election ===
1957 general election: Limerick East
Party	Candidate	FPv%	Count						
Party	Candidate	FPv%	1	2	3	4	5	6	7
Fianna Fáil	Donogh O'Malley	20.7	7,501						
Independent	Ted Russell	15.5	5,623	5,640	5,777	6,271	7,114	7,547	
Fianna Fáil	Paddy Clohessy	14.3	5,178	5,324	5,478	5,756	6,215	8,955	
Fine Gael	John Carew	11.6	4,193	4,196	5,060	5,541	5,738	5,962	6,155
Fianna Fáil	Patrick Maguire	9.5	3,455	3,524	3,665	3,932	4,265		
Clann na Poblachta	Stephen Coughlan	9.4	3,395	3,402	3,478	3,781	4,491	4,696	4,861
Sinn Féin	Pádraig Ó Maolcathaigh	8.5	3,085	3,092	3,141	3,380			
Labour	Christopher Keyes	5.8	2,098	2,102	2,319				
Fine Gael	Patrick Donegan	4.7	1,690	1,694					
Electorate: 46,854 Valid: 36,218 Quota: 7,244 Turnout: 77.3%

=== 1954 general election ===
1954 general election: Limerick East
Party	Candidate	FPv%	Count						
Party	Candidate	FPv%	1	2	3	4	5	6	7
Fianna Fáil	Donogh O'Malley	18.1	6,860	6,879	6,979	7,010	8,009		
Clann na Poblachta	Stephen Coughlan	14.9	5,652	5,808	6,145	6,824	7,107	7,170	7,272
Fine Gael	John Carew	14.2	5,362	6,344	9,244				
Labour	Michael Keyes	13.3	5,035	5,275	5,617	6,504	6,827	6,985	7,301
Fianna Fáil	Tadhg Crowley	12.8	4,857	5,083	5,138	5,171	7,983		
Fianna Fáil	Paddy Clohessy	11.8	4,458	4,495	4,564	4,613			
Fine Gael	James Reidy	8.5	3,196	3,886					
Fine Gael	Denis Quish	6.4	2,402						
Electorate: 47,468 Valid: 37,822 Quota: 7,565 Turnout: 79.7%

=== 1952 by-election ===
Following the death of Fianna Fáil TD Daniel Bourke, a by-election was held on 26 June 1952. The seat was won by the Fine Gael candidate John Carew.

1952 by-election: Limerick East
Party	Candidate	FPv%	Count		
Party	Candidate	FPv%	1	2	3
Fianna Fáil	Thomas Clarke	41.6	15,964	16,546	17,337
Fine Gael	John Carew	34.2	13,130	14,120	19,749
Clann na Poblachta	Ted Russell	16.9	6,465	7,523	
Labour	John Hayes	7.3	2,785		
Electorate: 48,730 Valid: 38,344 Quota: 19,173 Turnout: 78.7%

=== 1951 general election ===
1951 general election: Limerick East
Party	Candidate	FPv%	Count			
Party	Candidate	FPv%	1	2	3	4
Fianna Fáil	Daniel Bourke	19.6	7,268	7,471		
Labour	Michael Keyes	17.0	6,295	6,790	7,275	7,973
Fianna Fáil	Tadhg Crowley	14.2	5,266	5,456	9,601	
Clann na Poblachta	Ted Russell	13.5	5,017	5,331	5,502	5,740
Fianna Fáil	Robert Ryan	13.4	4,982	5,159		
Fine Gael	James Reidy	11.3	4,196	6,832	7,041	7,221
Fine Gael	George C. Bennett	11.0	4,079			
Electorate: 50,132 Valid: 37,103 Quota: 7,421 Turnout: 74.0%

=== 1948 general election ===
1948 general election: Limerick East
Party	Candidate	FPv%	Count						
Party	Candidate	FPv%	1	2	3	4	5	6	7
Fianna Fáil	Daniel Bourke	22.0	8,128						
Labour	Michael Keyes	15.6	5,756	5,806	5,871	6,118	6,553	7,066	7,612
Fine Gael	James Reidy	12.2	4,496	4,521	4,557	4,645	4,828	4,899	7,794
Fianna Fáil	Robert Ryan	11.4	4,187	4,375	4,396	4,461	4,859	7,832	
Fianna Fáil	Tadhg Crowley	9.3	3,420	3,866	3,902	4,002	4,105		
Fine Gael	George C. Bennett	9.0	3,326	3,333	3,380	3,417	4,230	4,433	
Clann na Poblachta	Ted Russell	7.5	2,777	2,786	3,236	4,559	4,784	4,894	5,191
Clann na Talmhan	Patrick Donegan	5.8	2,131	2,135	2,157	2,238			
Clann na Poblachta	Seán Carroll	4.2	1,533	1,554	1,989				
Clann na Poblachta	Thomas Malone	3.1	1,125	1,127					
Electorate: 49,565 Valid: 36,879 Quota: 7,376 Turnout: 74.4%

== See also ==
- Dáil constituencies
- Politics of the Republic of Ireland
- List of political parties in the Republic of Ireland
- List of Dáil by-elections
- Elections in the Republic of Ireland
