= Jim Kemmy =

Irish politician (1936–1997)

Teachta Dála
- In office February 1987 – 25 September 1997
- In office June 1981 – November 1982
- Constituency: Limerick East

Personal details
- Born: James Joseph Oliver Mary Kemmy; 14 September 1936 Limerick, Ireland
- Died: 25 September 1997 (aged 61) Limerick, Ireland
- Party: Labour Party (1963–1972; from 1990)
- Other political affiliations: Democratic Socialist Party (1982–1990); Independent (1972–1982)
- Domestic partner: Patsy Harrold

James Joseph Oliver Mary Kemmy (14 September 1936 – 25 September 1997) was an Irish socialist politician from Limerick, who started his political career in the Labour Party. He later left Labour, was elected as an independent Teachta Dála (TD), and founded the Democratic Socialist Party, which merged with the Labour Party in the 1990s.

== Early and personal life ==
Kemmy was born 14 September 1936 in O'Curry Street, Limerick, the eldest of three sons and two daughters of Michael Kemmy and Elizabeth Kemmy (née Pilkington). The family later moved to the Garryowen area of the city. His father's death from tuberculosis meant that he had to leave school at 15 for a stonemason apprenticeship to support his four siblings. He worked for many years as bricklayer for Limerick City Council. Kemmy was an atheist.

== Political career ==
In 1963, Kemmy joined the Labour Party and worked as a trade unionist. He was a member of the party's National Administrative Council, and its Director of Elections in 1969. He resigned from the party in 1972 because of conflict with local Labour TD Stephen Coughlan. Taking advantage of a change in the law which removed the ban on council employees standing for election as councillors, he was elected to Limerick City Council in 1974. He had pledged not to wear the formal robes of a councillor, saying that "While some councillors act like clowns, there is no need to dress like them."

In 1975 Kemmy founded the Limerick Family Planning Clinic. At the time, it was illegal to sell condoms in Ireland and the clinic was condemned by the Catholic Church.

Kemmy stood unsuccessfully as an independent candidate for Dáil Éireann in the Limerick East constituency at the 1977 general election. His second attempt, at the 1981 general election, was successful, and he was elected to the 22nd Dáil. During this time Kemmy criticised the 1981 Irish hunger strike which earned him the animosity of many Irish republicans and socialists as well as a number of his fellow trade unionists. Despite this he was re-elected at the February 1982 general election, but his opposition to the pro-life amendment to the Constitution had led to sustained attacks from the Catholic Church. At the November 1982 general election, Kemmy lost his seat to Labour's Frank Prendergast.

He returned to Dáil Éireann at the 1987 general election and was re-elected again at the 1989 general election. In May 1990, his Democratic Socialist Party merged with the Labour Party.

Kemmy was re-elected as a Labour Party TD at the 1992 general election and again at the 1997 general election. After the merger, Kemmy was elected vice-chairman of the Labour Party in 1991 and chairman in 1993. He was twice elected Mayor of Limerick, from 1991 to 1992 and again from 1995 to 1996.

Shortly before his death, Kemmy edited the acclaimed book The Limerick Anthology which featured the work of his admirer, Frank McCourt.

Kemmy was diagnosed with multiple myeloma in 1997. He died on 25 September 1997, following a short illness. He was buried in Mount St Lawrence cemetery, Limerick, after a secular funeral ceremony. The Limerick East by-election to fill the seat was held on 11 March 1998 and was won by the Labour Party candidate and former Democratic Socialist Party colleague Jan O'Sullivan.

== Election results ==
Elections to the Dáil
Party	Election		FPv	FPv%	Result
Independent	Limerick East	1977	2,333	5.2	Eliminated on count 6/10
Independent	Limerick East	1981	4,190	8.6	Elected on count 9/9
Independent	Limerick East	February 1982	8,597	13.7	Elected on count 10/10
Democratic Socialist	Limerick East	November 1982	4,125	8.7	Eliminated on count 8/9
Democratic Socialist	Limerick East	1987	5,920	11.9	Elected on count 12/13
Democratic Socialist	Limerick East	1989	9,168	19.8	Elected on count 1/8
Labour	Limerick East	1992	8,262	17.1	Elected on count 1/12
Labour	Limerick East	1997	2,702	5.4	Elected on count 11/11

== Historian ==
Kemmy was also very interested in Limerick's local history. He was the founder and editor of the Old Limerick Journal, which promoted the study of Limerick history with an emphasis on the neglected area of labour history. He edited two collections of Limerick-related prose and poetry, The Limerick anthology (1996) and The Limerick compendium (1997), and was joint author of Limerick in old postcards (1997).

== Legacy ==
The College of Business in the University of Limerick was named in his memory in 2003 as the "Kemmy Business School". The city council had proposed in 1999 to name a new bridge after Kemmy, but it was renamed the Abbey Bridge. In 2000 the Limerick City Museum was renamed the Jim Kemmy Municipal Museum. The Jim Kemmy Papers are housed at the Glucksman Library, University of Limerick.

Civic offices
Preceded by Paddy Madden	Mayor of Limerick; 1991–1992	Succeeded by John Quinn
Preceded by Dick Sadler	Mayor of Limerick; 1995–1996	Succeeded by Kieran O'Hanlon

Dáil	Election	Deputy (Party)	Deputy (Party)	Deputy (Party)	Deputy (Party)	Deputy (Party)
13th	1948	Michael Keyes (Lab)	Robert Ryan (FF)	James Reidy (FG)	Daniel Bourke (FF)	4 seats 1948–1981
14th	1951	Michael Keyes (Lab)	Tadhg Crowley (FF)	James Reidy (FG)	Daniel Bourke (FF)	4 seats 1948–1981
14th	1952 by-election	Michael Keyes (Lab)	Tadhg Crowley (FF)	James Reidy (FG)	John Carew (FG)	4 seats 1948–1981
15th	1954	Michael Keyes (Lab)	Tadhg Crowley (FF)	Donogh O'Malley (FF)	John Carew (FG)	4 seats 1948–1981
16th	1957	Ted Russell (Ind.)	Paddy Clohessy (FF)	Donogh O'Malley (FF)	John Carew (FG)	4 seats 1948–1981
17th	1961	Stephen Coughlan (Lab)	Paddy Clohessy (FF)	Donogh O'Malley (FF)	Tom O'Donnell (FG)	4 seats 1948–1981
18th	1965	Stephen Coughlan (Lab)	Paddy Clohessy (FF)	Donogh O'Malley (FF)	Tom O'Donnell (FG)	4 seats 1948–1981
18th	1968 by-election	Stephen Coughlan (Lab)	Paddy Clohessy (FF)	Desmond O'Malley (FF)	Tom O'Donnell (FG)	4 seats 1948–1981
19th	1969	Stephen Coughlan (Lab)	Michael Herbert (FF)	Desmond O'Malley (FF)	Tom O'Donnell (FG)	4 seats 1948–1981
20th	1973	Stephen Coughlan (Lab)	Michael Herbert (FF)	Desmond O'Malley (FF)	Tom O'Donnell (FG)	4 seats 1948–1981
21st	1977	Michael Lipper (Ind.)	Michael Herbert (FF)	Desmond O'Malley (FF)	Tom O'Donnell (FG)	4 seats 1948–1981
22nd	1981	Jim Kemmy (Ind.)	Peadar Clohessy (FF)	Desmond O'Malley (FF)	Tom O'Donnell (FG)	Michael Noonan (FG)
23rd	1982 (Feb)	Jim Kemmy (DSP)	Willie O'Dea (FF)	Desmond O'Malley (FF)	Tom O'Donnell (FG)	Michael Noonan (FG)
24th	1982 (Nov)	Frank Prendergast (Lab)	Willie O'Dea (FF)	Desmond O'Malley (FF)	Tom O'Donnell (FG)	Michael Noonan (FG)
25th	1987	Jim Kemmy (DSP)	Willie O'Dea (FF)	Desmond O'Malley (PDs)	Peadar Clohessy (PDs)	Michael Noonan (FG)
26th	1989	Jim Kemmy (DSP)	Willie O'Dea (FF)	Desmond O'Malley (PDs)	Peadar Clohessy (PDs)	Michael Noonan (FG)
27th	1992	Jim Kemmy (Lab)	Willie O'Dea (FF)	Desmond O'Malley (PDs)	Peadar Clohessy (PDs)	Michael Noonan (FG)
28th	1997	Jim Kemmy (Lab)	Willie O'Dea (FF)	Desmond O'Malley (PDs)	Eddie Wade (FF)	Michael Noonan (FG)
28th	1998 by-election	Jan O'Sullivan (Lab)	Willie O'Dea (FF)	Desmond O'Malley (PDs)	Eddie Wade (FF)	Michael Noonan (FG)
29th	2002	Jan O'Sullivan (Lab)	Willie O'Dea (FF)	Tim O'Malley (PDs)	Peter Power (FF)	Michael Noonan (FG)
30th	2007	Jan O'Sullivan (Lab)	Willie O'Dea (FF)	Kieran O'Donnell (FG)	Peter Power (FF)	Michael Noonan (FG)
31st	2011	Constituency abolished. See Limerick City and Limerick				
