= Nora Bennis =

Irish housewife and political activist

- Bennis, c. 1990s
- Born: Nora Shinners; 11 November 1940
- Died: 11 February 2019 (aged 78)
- Occupations: Housewife; Political activist
- Years active: 1992 to 2016
- Political party: Catholic Democrats

Nora Bennis (11 November 1940 – 11 February 2019) was an Irish housewife and political activist from Limerick, who was a prominent advocate of traditional Catholic family values in the 1990s.

== Early and personal life ==
Bennis was born Nora Shinners, the daughter of Paul Shinners, a veteran of the Easter Rising and Fianna Fáil supporter who emigrated to England and returned to Limerick after marrying Margaret, with whom he had five children. Aged 22, Nora married Gerry Bennis, who worked for Telecom Éireann and was prominent in Limerick GAA; his brothers Richie and Phil both won a 1973 All-Ireland hurling medal. Nora and Gerry had three daughters and a son. She taught Irish dance.

== Early activism ==
Bennis began her activism after going to a 1990 conference in Brighton hoping to hear Mother Teresa, who did not attend. She was impressed by speakers who criticised the "liberal agenda". After the 1992 X Case reopened Ireland's abortion debate, she started Women Working at Home and the Irish Mothers Working at Home Association, as a support network for housewives who felt isolated or ignored. She criticised the Department of Education's sex education program as being values-free, and its "Stay Safe" program of child sexual abuse awareness as undermining parental authority.

In the mid 1990s, Bennis called for a boycott of a sex shop which had opened in Limerick, and staged a protest outside the shop where she led her supporters in saying the rosary. They marched barefoot up and down Ellen Street with Rosary Beads in their hands

In 1994 she became leader of the Solidarity Movement, an alliance of independent political candidates linked to the Family Solidarity pressure-group. She stood as an independent in Munster in the 1994 European Parliament election, getting 5% of the first-preference vote. This unexpectedly strong showing increased her media profile. In 1995 the Solidarity Movement was part of the "No to Divorce" campaign, one of two coalitions which opposed the successful 1995 referendum to introduce divorce. After the referendum, she founded the National Party, which was anti-abortion and proposed a £100 allowance for non-working mothers. She stood for the party in Limerick East in the general elections of 1997 and 2002 and the 1998 by-election, receiving progressively fewer votes.

== 2010s ==
Bennis was a spokesperson for Catholic Democrats (previously named National Party and the Christian Democrats) and secretary of Mothers Alliance Ireland; both groups opposed the 2012 children's rights amendment. She formed a group called Alliance of Parents Against the State, intended to co-ordinate opposition to the amendment. She claimed the amendment would put children "in grave danger of being legally snatched by the State".

Bennis was one of three substitutes for Catholic Democrats candidate Theresa Heaney in the South constituency in the 2014 European elections. She was a candidate in the 2016 general election in the Limerick City constituency, where she failed to be elected, receiving 1.4% of the first-preference vote.

== Death ==
Bennis died in Limerick on 11 February 2019, aged 78.
