= Liberal Party of Ireland =

Defunct Irish political party

- Chairman: Kevin Smith
- Founded: 16 November 1967
- Dissolved: c. May 1969
- Headquarters: Appian Way, Dublin
- Youth wing: Young Liberal Movement of Ireland
- Ideology: Liberalism; Social Liberalism; Pro-Europeanism
- Political position: Centre to Centre left

The Liberal Party of Ireland, sometimes also referred to as the Irish Liberal Party, was a minor political party in Ireland, formed in 1967 and lasting briefly until roughly 1969.

The party was formed on 16 November 1967 and was supported by members of the Ulster Liberal Party, particularly its leader Albert McElroy and Sheelagh Murnaghan, an MP for the Party in Northern Ireland at the time. Seán Dublin Bay Rockall Loftus was amongst those in attendance of its inaugural meeting. The stated aim of the party at its creation was to be part of an alliance of Liberals in both the Republic of Ireland and Northern Ireland who together would work for religious pluralism across the island in the face of the mounting tensions which would develop into the Troubles within a few years. Another raison d'être cited for the creation of the party was the social conservatism experienced in Ireland at the time, with speakers suggests the three major Irish parties (Fine Gael, Fianna Fáil and Labour) were all contributing to that atmosphere. Both the Ulster and Irish Liberals agreed the Republic should embrace the European identify and push towards membership of the EEC.

The Liberal Party contested two by-elections in 1968, one in Wicklow in March and one in Limerick East in May. However, the party struggled to make headway and running candidates in elections quickly sapped the party's resources. By December 1968 a motion to abolish the party in favour of becoming a "political movement" instead was proposed internally. Although rejected, it reflected the weakening strength of the party.

During the 1968 Wicklow by-election, a spokesperson for the Liberal Party said that it had been created to give the Irish voters something other than the "crude capitalism" of Fianna Fáil and the "crude socialism" of Labour, while the then chairperson of the party Kevin Smith derided members of Sinn Féin as "Communists in Green suits".

In October 1968, Ireland held a referendum on its voting system of proportional representation and the Liberal Party came out strongly in favour of its retention.

The Liberal Party did not contest the 1969 general election. However, in Limerick East, where the party had some strength, they endorsed an Independent candidate Hilda O'Malley who had recently split from Fianna Fáil. O'Malley came 5th in the 4-seat constituency.

By May 1969, the party had become defunct, with prominent members resigning, citing declining numbers and interest in the party. Conversely, the party's youth wing the Young Liberal Movement in Ireland continued to operate independently until 1972.

Many members of the Liberal Party would later be involved in another attempt to create a liberal party in Ireland in the form of the Community Democrats of Ireland. Michael B. Crowe, who had been the Liberal Party candidate in the Limerick by-election, was also a prominent member of the Community Democrats.

== Election results ==
Election	Candidate name	First-pref. votes	First-pref. percentage
1968 Wicklow by-election	Kevin McLeavey	526	1.9%
1968 Limerick East by-election	Michael B. Crowe	1,209	3.2%
