= 2009 Limerick County Council election =

Part of the 2009 Irish local elections

← 2004	5 June 2009	2014 →

28 seats on Limerick County Council
	First party	Second party	Third party
Party	Fine Gael	Fianna Fáil	Labour
Seats won	15	9	2
Seat change	+3	-3	+1
	Fourth party	Fifth party
Party	Independent	Progressive Democrats
Seats won	2	0
Seat change	+2	-3
- Map showing the area of Limerick County Council
Council control after election
Fine Gael

An election to Limerick County Council took place on 5 June 2009 as part of that year's Irish local elections. 28 councillors were elected from five local electoral areas (LEAs) for a five-year term of office on the electoral system of proportional representation by means of the single transferable vote (PR-STV).

== Results by party ==
Party	Seats	±	First Pref. votes	FPv%	±%
Fine Gael	15	+3	26,788	44.82	
Fianna Fáil	9	-3	20,502	34.30	
Labour	2	+1	6,814	11.40	
Independent	2	+2	4,453	7.45	
Progressive Democrats	0	-3	-	-	
Totals	28	-	59,764	100.00	—

== Results by local electoral area ==
=== Adare ===
Adare - 7 seats
Party	Candidate	FPv%	Count									
Party	Candidate	FPv%	1	2	3	4	5	6	7	8	9	10
Fine Gael	Leo Walsh*	15.50	1,833									
Fine Gael	Rose Brennan*	14.85	1,757									
Labour	Tomas Hannon*	13.84	1,637									
Fine Gael	Richard Butler*	13.58	1,606									
Fianna Fáil	James Collins	12.48	1,476	1,544								
Fianna Fáil	Leonard Enright*	6.51	770	806	832	845	864	877	1,096	1,534		
Independent	Seamus Sheahan	6.39	756	807	852	891	911	1,011	1,069	1,148	1,151	1,168
Fianna Fáil	James Cavanagh*	5.79	685	706	801	808	820	833	923			
Independent	Patrick Fitzgerald	5.12	606	699	773	828	874	923	999	1,116	1,134	1,172
Fianna Fáil	Richard Crehan	4.47	529	575	589	602	611	622				
Independent	Richie Smith	1.46	173	212	236	267	288					
Electorate: 22,155 Valid: 11,828 (53.39%) Spoilt: 169 Quota: 1,479 Turnout: 11,997 (54.15%)

=== Castleconnell ===
Castleconnell - 7 seats
Party	Candidate	FPv%	Count							
Party	Candidate	FPv%	1	2	3	4	5	6	7	8
Fine Gael	Mary Jackman*	14.60	1,993							
Fianna Fáil	Eddie Wade*	13.44	1,805							
Independent	Brigid Teefy*	11.11	1,492	1,520	1,546	1,590	1,629	1,733		
Fine Gael	John Egan	10.10	1,356	1,402	1,413	1,442	1,454	1,478	1,529	1,552
Fine Gael	Michael Sheahan	9.44	1,267	1,369	1,383	1,465	1,471	1,523	1,550	1,560
Fianna Fáil	Noel Gleeson*	8.63	1,159	1,164	1,179	1,189	1,209	1,366	1,747	
Fine Gael	Mary Harty*	8.93	1,199	1,256	1,267	1,297	1,305	1,345	1,582	1,606
Labour	Elena Secas	7.78	1,045	1,083	1,155	1,298	1,304	1,406	1,464	1,475
Fianna Fáil	Joe Meagher*	6.56	881	885	887	888	904	1,019		
Fianna Fáil	Brian Stokes	4.66	626	638	649	676	695			
Green	Trish Forde-Brennan	2.76	371	391	408					
Sinn Féin	Seamus Keating	1.74	234	236						
Electorate: 23,650 Valid: 13,428 (56.78%) Spoilt: 127 Quota: 1,679 Turnout: 13,555 (57.32%)

=== Kilmallock ===
Kilmallock - 5 seats
Party	Candidate	FPv%	Count									
Party	Candidate	FPv%	1	2	3	4	5	6	7	8	9	10
Labour	James Heffernan	18.22	2,282									
Fianna Fáil	Eddie Ryan	14.69	1,840	1,851	1,878	1,942	2,176					
Fine Gael	Mike Houlihan	12,57	1,575	1,609	1,663	1,736	1,895	2,141				
Fianna Fáil	Mike Donegan	10.11	1,266	1,278	1,296	1,428	1,446	1,682	1,691	1,727	1,752	1,785
Fine Gael	William O'Donnell	9.63	1,206	1,227	1,250	1,325	1,394	1,495	1,508	2,156		
Fine Gael	Gerard Mitchell	8.54	1,070	1,083	1,098	1,138	1,204	1,230	1,254			
Fianna Fáil	Mary Burke	7.66	960	970	978	1,110	1,189	1,316	1,357	1,658	1,700	1,719
Fianna Fáil	Richard O'Donoghue	6.10	764	775	780	882	893					
Independent	Jim Hickey	5.40	677	728	763	788						
Fianna Fáil	John Clifford*	5.38	674	679	687							
Sinn Féin	Richard Young	1.71	214									
Electorate: 18,955 Valid: 12,528 (66.09%) Spoilt: 143 Quota: 2,089 Turnout: 12,671 (66.85%)

=== Newcastle West ===
Newcastle West - 5 seats
Party	Candidate	FPv%	Count							
Party	Candidate	FPv%	1	2	3	4	5	6	7	8
Fine Gael	Jerome Scanlan*	22.86	2,823							
Fine Gael	Patrick O'Donovan*	18.25	2,254							
Fine Gael	Liam Galvin*	14.27	1,762	2,045	2,117					
Fianna Fáil	Michael J. Collins*	12.42	1,534	1,638	1,667	1,701	1,703	1,758	1,937	2,158
Fianna Fáil	Francis Foley*	11.00	1,358	1,401	1,415	1,427	1,434	1,497	1,586	1,916
Labour	Stephen Goulding	7.21	890	1,031	1,085	1,115	1,144	1,300	1,376	1,495
Fianna Fáil	Seamus Ahern	5.84	721	733	739	745	746	777	880	
Fianna Fáil	Anne Lordan	3.47	428	499	504	553	553	588		
Sinn Féin	Mike MacDomhnaill	3.14	388	429	442	495	499			
Independent	Seamus O Suilleabhain	1.55	192	261	263					
Electorate: 19,218 Valid: 12,350 (64.26%) Spoilt: 153 Quota: 2,059 Turnout: 12,503 (65.06%)

=== Rathkeale ===
Rathkeale - 4 seats
Party	Candidate	FPv%	Count				
Party	Candidate	FPv%	1	2	3	4	5
Fine Gael	John Sheahan*	19.74	1,901	1,905	1,941		
Fine Gael	Stephen Keary	18.41	1,773	1,791	1,854	1,893	2,130
Fine Gael	David Naughton*	14.67	1,413	1,416	1,514	1,585	1,684
Fianna Fáil	Kevin Sheahan*	13.77	1,326	1,331	1,427	1,702	2,122
Labour	Seamus Hogan	9.97	960	981	1,069	1,113	1,226
Fianna Fáil	Michael Mulcair	9.40	905	923	943	1,095	
Fianna Fáil	Joe Wallace	8.26	795	796	809		
Independent	Pat Wallace	4.59	442	475			
Independent	Patrick O'Doherty	1.19	115				
Electorate: 15,636 Valid: 9,630 (61.59%) Spoilt: 149 Quota: 1,927 Turnout: 9,779 (62.54%)
