= 1991 Limerick County Council election =

Part of the 1991 Irish local elections

- 27 June 1991

All 28 seats on Limerick County Council
| | First party | Second party | Third party |
|---|---|---|---|
| Party | Fianna Fáil | Fine Gael | Progressive Democrats |
| Seats won | 13 | 10 | 4 |
| Seat change | -5 | - | +4 |
| | Fourth party |
| Party | Labour |
| Seats won | 1 |
| Seat change | +1 |
- Map showing the area of Limerick County Council
Council control after election
TBD

An election to Limerick County Council took place on 27 June 1991 as part of that year's Irish local elections. 28 councillors were elected from five local electoral areas (LEAs) for a five-year term of office on the electoral system of proportional representation by means of the single transferable vote (PR-STV). This term was extended twice, first to 1998, then to 1999.

== Results by party ==
| Party | Seats | ± | First Pref. votes | FPv% | ±% |
|---|---|---|---|---|---|
| Fianna Fáil | 13 | -5 | 21,238 | 43.28 | |
| Fine Gael | 10 | - | 15,765 | 32.13 | |
| Progressive Democrats | 4 | +4 | 7,627 | 15.54 | |
| Labour | 1 | +1 | 1,990 | 4.06 | |
| Totals | 28 | - | 49,068 | 100.00 | — |

== Results by local electoral area ==
=== Bruff ===
Bruff - 6 seats
| Party | Candidate | FPv% | Count | | | | | | |
| Party | Candidate | FPv% | 1 | 2 | 3 | 4 | 5 | 6 | 7 |
|---|---|---|---|---|---|---|---|---|---|
| Fianna Fáil | Michael Brennan* | 18.4% | 1,976 | | | | | | |
| Fine Gael | Michael Noonan TD | 13.7% | 1,480 | 1,492 | 1,514 | 1,565 | | | |
| Fianna Fáil | Michael Collins* | 12.3% | 1,328 | 1,497 | 1,505 | 1,545 | | | |
| Fianna Fáil | John Clifford | 12.2% | 1,316 | 1,465 | 1,479 | 1,508 | 1,522 | 1,525 | 1,646 |
| Progressive Democrats | Tim O'Malley | 11.9% | 1,281 | 1,300 | 1,408 | 1,661 | | | |
| Fine Gael | Jim McCarthy* | 9.6% | 1,034 | 1,039 | 1,112 | 1,126 | 1,168 | 1,174 | 1,473 |
| Fine Gael | Charlie Hanley | 7.9% | 855 | 911 | 918 | 969 | 996 | 1,005 | 1,099 |
| Labour | Noelle Dason | 6.9% | 740 | 748 | 780 | 822 | 861 | 869 | |
| Progressive Democrats | Bobbie Penn | 4.0% | 434 | 447 | 502 | | | | |
| Progressive Democrats | John Wright | 3.0% | 323 | 329 | | | | | |
Electorate: 19,044 Valid: 10,767 (56.54%) Spoilt: 76 Quota: 1,539 Turnout: 10,843 (56.94%)

=== Castleconnell ===
Castleconnell - 6 seats
| Party | Candidate | FPv% | Count | | | | | | | | | |
| Party | Candidate | FPv% | 1 | 2 | 3 | 4 | 5 | 6 | 7 | 8 | 9 | 10 |
|---|---|---|---|---|---|---|---|---|---|---|---|---|
| Fianna Fáil | Eddie Wade* | 17.9% | 2,039 | | | | | | | | | |
| Progressive Democrats | Peadar Clohessy TD* | 14.2% | 1,623 | 1,722 | | | | | | | | |
| Fine Gael | Senator Mary Jackman* | 12.6% | 1,443 | 1,465 | 1,477 | 1,702 | | | | | | |
| Fine Gael | Paddy Hourigan* | 9.2% | 1,048 | 1,065 | 1,078 | 1,097 | 1,110 | 1,212 | 1,320 | 1,373 | 1,542 | 1,557 |
| Fianna Fáil | Noel Gleeson* | 8.2% | 934 | 998 | 1,006 | 1,017 | 1,019 | 1,167 | 1,193 | 1,467 | 1,697 | |
| Fianna Fáil | Willie Keane | 6.7% | 760 | 812 | 823 | 855 | 861 | 882 | 984 | 1,109 | 1,186 | 1,218 |
| Independent | William Meagher | 6.3% | 721 | 733 | 736 | 766 | 770 | 804 | 913 | 1,037 | | |
| Progressive Democrats | Michael Finucane | 5.5% | 631 | 660 | 680 | 742 | 759 | 960 | 1,044 | 1,099 | 1,210 | 1,228 |
| Fianna Fáil | Tim Long | 5.4% | 612 | 692 | 704 | 715 | 718 | 748 | 779 | | | |
| Progressive Democrats | Martin Ryan | 5.0% | 574 | 589 | 592 | 600 | 606 | | | | | |
| Labour | Joe Liston | 4.8% | 552 | 562 | 568 | 604 | 623 | 639 | | | | |
| Independent | Jim Duffy | 4.2% | 484 | 491 | 493 | | | | | | | |
Electorate: 18,499 Valid: 11,421 (61.74%) Spoilt: 95 Quota: 1,632 Turnout: 11,516 (62.25%)

=== Kilmallock ===
Kilmallock - 5 seats
| Party | Candidate | FPv% | Count | | | |
| Party | Candidate | FPv% | 1 | 2 | 3 | 4 |
|---|---|---|---|---|---|---|
| Fine Gael | Matt Callaghan* | 22.7% | 1,865 | | | |
| Fine Gael | Jim Houlihan* | 18.0% | 1,479 | | | |
| Fianna Fáil | Michael Barry* | 15.8% | 1,298 | 1,334 | 1,352 | 1,651 |
| Progressive Democrats | Eddie Creighton* | 15.2% | 1,248 | 1,325 | 1,341 | 1,434 |
| Fianna Fáil | William Sampson* | 12.8% | 1,053 | 1,147 | 1,151 | 1,389 |
| Fine Gael | John O'Grady | 7.9% | 654 | 829 | 887 | 916 |
| Fianna Fáil | Alan Mee* | 7.7% | 634 | 745 | 756 | |
Electorate: 12,482 Valid: 8,231 (65.94%) Spoilt: 97 Quota: 1,372 Turnout: 8,328 (66.72%)

=== Newcastle ===
Newcastle - 6 seats
| Party | Candidate | FPv% | Count | | | | | | |
| Party | Candidate | FPv% | 1 | 2 | 3 | 4 | 5 | 6 | 7 |
|---|---|---|---|---|---|---|---|---|---|
| Fianna Fáil | Michael O'Kelly* | 17.4% | 1,668 | | | | | | |
| Fine Gael | Michael Finucane TD* | 13.5% | 1,300 | 1,309 | 1,331 | 1,382 | | | |
| Fianna Fáil | Michael Healy* | 11.2% | 1,075 | 1,106 | 1,125 | 1,170 | 1,196 | 1,281 | 1,354 |
| Fianna Fáil | John Cregan | 10.5% | 1,013 | 1,039 | 1,040 | 1,048 | 1,107 | 1,146 | 1,285 |
| Fianna Fáil | Thomas Ahern* | 10.2% | 976 | 1,109 | 1,119 | 1,129 | 1,147 | 1,171 | 1,208 |
| Fine Gael | Seán Broderick | 9.7% | 933 | 1,011 | 1,012 | 1,025 | 1,044 | 1,107 | 1,374 |
| Fine Gael | John Kelly* | 7.3% | 706 | 709 | 726 | 757 | 814 | 927 | |
| Labour | Mary Kelly | 7.3% | 698 | 704 | 736 | 783 | 845 | 1,009 | 1,228 |
| Progressive Democrats | Sean Liston | 5.5% | 525 | 529 | 533 | 605 | 628 | | |
| Sinn Féin | Coireall MacCurtain | 3.1% | 300 | 301 | 304 | 311 | | | |
| Progressive Democrats | Seamus Hunt | 3.0% | 288 | 292 | 301 | | | | |
| Independent | Michael Flynn | 1.3% | 127 | 127 | | | | | |
Electorate: 14,404 Valid: 9,609 (66.71%) Spoilt: 109 Quota: 1,373 Turnout: 9,718 (67.47%)

=== Rathkeale ===
Rathkeale - 5 seats
| Party | Candidate | FPv% | Count | | | | | | | |
| Party | Candidate | FPv% | 1 | 2 | 3 | 4 | 5 | 6 | 7 | 8 |
|---|---|---|---|---|---|---|---|---|---|---|
| Fine Gael | Senator Dan Neville* | 18.8% | 1,699 | | | | | | | |
| Fianna Fáil | Kevin Sheahan* | 17.9% | 1,614 | | | | | | | |
| Fianna Fáil | John Griffin* | 16.5% | 1,493 | 1,522 | | | | | | |
| Fianna Fáil | Maureen Barrett* | 16.0% | 1,449 | 1,457 | 1,503 | 1,504 | 1,515 | | | |
| Fine Gael | Jimmy Reidy | 7.7% | 696 | 729 | 732 | 732 | 737 | 775 | 821 | |
| Fine Gael | David Naughton | 6.3% | 573 | 638 | 654 | 656 | 673 | 736 | 832 | 1,222 |
| Progressive Democrats | John Carrig | 6.2% | 564 | 585 | 604 | 607 | 651 | 721 | 896 | 1,017 |
| Green | Patrick O'Doherty | 5.9% | 532 | 551 | 555 | 558 | 581 | 635 | | |
| Independent | Basil Fitzgibbon | 3.1% | 284 | 291 | 308 | 308 | 320 | | | |
| Progressive Democrats | Patrick Sheehan | 1.5% | 136 | 146 | 148 | 154 | | | | |
Electorate: 12,705 Valid: 9,040 (71.15%) Spoilt: 147 Quota: 1,507 Turnout: 9,113 (71.73%)
