= 1985 Limerick County Council election =

Part of the 1985 Irish local elections

- 20 June 1985

All 28 seats on Limerick County Council
| | First party | Second party | Third party |
|---|---|---|---|
| Party | Fianna Fáil | Fine Gael | Independent |
| Seats won | 18 | 10 | 0 |
| Seat change | +3 | -1 | -1 |
- Map showing the area of Limerick County Council
Council control after election
Fianna Fail

An election to Limerick County Council took place on 20 June 1985 as part of the Irish local elections. 28 councillors were elected from five local electoral areas (LEAs) for a five-year term of office on the electoral system of proportional representation by means of the single transferable vote (PR-STV). This term was extended for a further year, to 1991.

== Results by party ==
| Party | Seats | ± | First pref. votes | FPv% | ±% |
|---|---|---|---|---|---|
| Fianna Fáil | 18 | +3 | 27,169 | 57.59 | |
| Fine Gael | 10 | -1 | 17,639 | 37.39 | |
| Independent | 0 | -1 | 1,152 | 2.44 | |
| Totals | 28 | - | 47,180 | 100.00 | |

== Results by local electoral area ==
=== Bruff ===
Bruff: 6 seats
| Party | Candidate | FPv% | Count | | | | | | | | |
| Party | Candidate | FPv% | 1 | 2 | 3 | 4 | 5 | 6 | 7 | 8 | 9 |
|---|---|---|---|---|---|---|---|---|---|---|---|
| Fianna Fáil | Michael J. Noonan TD* | | 1,552 | | | | | | | | |
| Fianna Fáil | Michael Collins* | | 1,381 | | | | | | | | |
| Fine Gael | Jim McCarthy | | 1,234 | 1,238 | 1,239 | 1,275 | 1,325 | | | | |
| Fine Gael | William O'Brien TD* | | 1,160 | 1,185 | 1,190 | 1,197 | 1,231 | 1,235 | 1,246 | 1,246 | 1,649 |
| Fianna Fáil | Michael Brennan* | | 1,110 | 1,235 | 1,266 | 1,281 | 1,306 | 1,307 | 1,461 | | |
| Fine Gael | Michael Whelan | | 1,046 | 1,051 | 1,057 | 1,075 | 1,161 | 1,166 | 1,179 | 1,180 | 1,241 |
| Fine Gael | Tommy Healy | | 528 | 531 | 533 | 535 | 545 | 547 | 551 | 555 | |
| Fianna Fáil | Patrick Fitzgerald | | 439 | 500 | 515 | 520 | 535 | 535 | 649 | 750 | 783 |
| Fianna Fáil | Pat Frost | | 318 | 334 | 341 | 353 | 370 | 372 | | | |
| Labour | Liam Coughlan | | 232 | 233 | 235 | 277 | | | | | |
| Green Alliance | Declan Lehane | | 175 | 176 | 177 | | | | | | |
Electorate: 15,910 Valid: 9,175 (58.28%) Spoilt: 97 Quota: 1,311 Turnout: 9,272

=== Castleconnell ===
Castleconnell: 6 seats
| Party | Candidate | FPv% | Count | | | | | | | |
| Party | Candidate | FPv% | 1 | 2 | 3 | 4 | 5 | 6 | 7 | 8 |
|---|---|---|---|---|---|---|---|---|---|---|
| Fianna Fáil | Peadar Clohessy* | | 2,000 | | | | | | | |
| Fianna Fáil | Eddie Wade* | | 1,965 | | | | | | | |
| Fine Gael | Mary Jackman | | 1,385 | 1,416 | 1,447 | 1,493 | 1,494 | 1,872 | | |
| Fine Gael | Paddy Hourigan* | | 1,364 | 1,386 | 1,406 | 1,429 | 1,430 | 1,767 | | |
| Fianna Fáil | Liam Hickey* | | 1,216 | 1,374 | 1,550 | | | | | |
| Fine Gael | Tommy Wallace | | 832 | 884 | 931 | 954 | 957 | | | |
| Fianna Fáil | Noel Gleeson | | 821 | 917 | 1,001 | 1,043 | 1,058 | 1,125 | 1,202 | 1,248 |
| Fianna Fáil | Martin Carroll | | 809 | 934 | 1,023 | 1,036 | 1,056 | 1,098 | 1,136 | 1,181 |
| Independent | John O'Donoghue | | 175 | 179 | 187 | | | | | |
Electorate: 16,901 Valid: 10,565 (63.29%) Spoilt: 131 Quota: 1,510 Turnout: 10,696

=== Kilmallock ===
Kilmallock: 5 seats
| Party | Candidate | FPv% | Count | | | | | | | |
| Party | Candidate | FPv% | 1 | 2 | 3 | 4 | 5 | 6 | 7 | 8 |
|---|---|---|---|---|---|---|---|---|---|---|
| Fine Gael | Matt Callaghan* | | 1,718 | | | | | | | |
| Fianna Fáil | Michael Maguire* | | 1,516 | | | | | | | |
| Fianna Fáil | Michael Barry* | | 1,106 | 1,128 | 1,144 | 1,163 | 1,195 | 1,562 | | |
| Fianna Fáil | William Sampson* | | 1,075 | 1,126 | 1,229 | 1,354 | 1,392 | 1,555 | | |
| Fine Gael | Jim Houlihan | | 872 | 913 | 924 | 1,059 | 1,062 | 1,212 | 1,256 | 1,267 |
| Fianna Fáil | John Kelleher | | 819 | 824 | 831 | 846 | 856 | | | |
| Fine Gael | Nicholas Hayes | | 775 | 878 | 908 | 1,093 | 1,101 | 1,154 | 1,179 | 1,190 |
| Fianna Fáil | James Reardon | | 425 | 467 | 533 | | | | | |
| Labour | Tom Rea | | 242 | 271 | | | | | | |
Electorate: 12,310 Valid: 8,548 (70.46%) Spoilt: 99 Quota: 1,425 Turnout: 8,647

=== Newcastle ===
Newcastle: 6 seats
| Party | Candidate | FPv% | Count | | | | | | |
| Party | Candidate | FPv% | 1 | 2 | 3 | 4 | 5 | 6 | 7 |
|---|---|---|---|---|---|---|---|---|---|
| Fianna Fáil | Michael O'Kelly* | | 1,747 | | | | | | |
| Fianna Fáil | Michael Healy* | | 1,431 | | | | | | |
| Fianna Fáil | Thomas Ahern* | | 1,216 | 1,425 | | | | | |
| Fine Gael | John Kelly* | | 1,151 | 1,156 | 1,257 | 1,267 | 1,512 | | |
| Fianna Fáil | Tom Cregan* | | 1,117 | 1,182 | 1,208 | 1,245 | 1,335 | 1,383 | |
| Fine Gael | Michael Finucane | | 1,052 | 1,061 | 1,165 | 1,176 | 1,244 | 1,245 | 1,330 |
| Fine Gael | Seán Broderick* | | 979 | 1065 | 1,098 | 1,100 | 1,222 | 1,229 | 1,287 |
| Fine Gael | John L. O'Sullivan | | 553 | 529 | 533 | 605 | 628 | | |
| Labour | Patrick Brennan | | 333 | 335 | | | | | |
Electorate: 13,910 Valid: 9,579 (69.71%) Spoilt: 118 Quota: 1,369 Turnout: 9,697

=== Rathkeale ===
Rathkeale: 5 seats
| Party | Candidate | FPv% | Count | | | | | | | |
| Party | Candidate | FPv% | 1 | 2 | 3 | 4 | 5 | 6 | 7 | 8 |
|---|---|---|---|---|---|---|---|---|---|---|
| Fianna Fáil | John Griffin* | | 1,973 | | | | | | | |
| Fianna Fáil | Maureen Barrett* | | 1,455 | 1,522 | 1,593 | | | | | |
| Fianna Fáil | Paddy Sheehy* | | 1,228 | 1,365 | 1,390 | 1,456 | 1,499 | 1,539 | 1,553 | |
| Fianna Fáil | Kevin Sheahan | | 875 | 967 | 990 | 1,121 | 1,186 | 1,226 | 1,239 | 1,483 |
| Fine Gael | Dan Neville | | 812 | 854 | 860 | 886 | 1,028 | 1,193 | 1,194 | 1,280 |
| Fine Gael | Gerry Foley | | 786 | 805 | 812 | 839 | 991 | 1,148 | 1,151 | 1,263 |
| Independent | Margaret O'Shaughnessy | | 557 | 581 | 622 | 688 | 710 | 834 | 843 | |
| Fine Gael | Jerry Brennan | | 510 | 513 | 571 | 579 | 620 | | | |
| Fine Gael | Tim Kelly | | 457 | 469 | 477 | 525 | | | | |
| Independent | Joseph McCarthy | | 366 | 377 | 400 | | | | | |
| Sinn Féin | Donnchadh O Nuallain | | 240 | 249 | | | | | | |
| Independent | Con Scanlon | | 54 | 58 | | | | | | |
Electorate: 12,557 Valid: 9,313 (75.03%) Spoilt: 108 Quota: 1,553 Turnout: 9,421
