= 1999 Limerick County Council election =

Part of the 1999 Irish local elections

- 10 June 1999

All 28 seats to Limerick County Council
	First party	Second party	Third party
Party	Fianna Fáil	Fine Gael	Progressive Democrats
Seats won	14	10	3
Seat change	+1	-	-1
	Fourth party	Fifth party
Party	Independent	Labour
Seats won	1	0
Seat change	+1	-1
- Map showing the area of Limerick County Council
Council control after election
Fianna Fail

An election to Limerick County Council took place on 10 June 1999 as part of that year's Irish local elections. 28 councillors were elected from five local electoral areas for a five-year term of office on the system of proportional representation by means of the single transferable vote (PR-STV).

== Results by party ==
Party	Seats	±	First Pref. votes	FPv%	±%
Fianna Fáil	14	+1	22,298	46.04	
Fine Gael	10	-	15,692	32.40	
Progressive Democrats	3	-1	4,775	9.86	
Independent	1	+1	4,030	8.32	
Labour	0	-1	941	1.94	
Totals	28	-	48,434	100.00	—

== Results by local electoral area ==
=== Bruff ===
Bruff - 7 seats
Party	Candidate	FPv%	Count								
Party	Candidate	FPv%	1	2	3	4	5	6	7	8	9
Fianna Fáil	Michael Brennan*	15.80	1,624								
Progressive Democrats	Tim O'Malley*	13.68	1,406								
Fine Gael	Cormac Hurley	11.80	1,213	1,224	1,238	1,271	1,403				
Fianna Fáil	John Clifford*	9.90	1,132	1,234	1,243	1,259	1,273	1,279	1,473		
Fine Gael	Richard Butler	10.84	1,114	1,133	1,163	1,182	1,199	1,202	1,225	1,233	1,415
Fianna Fáil	Leonard Enright	9.12	937	1,035	1,042	1,052	1,068	1,071	1,198	1,261	1,316
Fianna Fáil	Sandra Marsh	6.97	716	738	748	772	865	917	980	1,010	1,133
Fine Gael	Edmond Costello	5.78	594	619	624	631	637	646	686	696	759
Fianna Fáil	Patrick Fitzgerald	4.74	487	535	539	541	547	547			
Labour	Trisha Keyes-Bevan	4.63	476	481	490	548	596	611	625	634	
Progressive Democrats	Pat Hennessy	3.43	353	357	384	410					
Green	David Edler	1.38	142	147	151						
Independent	Denis Riordan	0.82	84	84	86						
Electorate: 21,941 Valid: 10,278 (46.84%) Spoilt: 112 Quota: 1,285 Turnout: 10,390 (47.35%)

=== Castleconnell ===
Castleconnell - 7 seats
Party	Candidate	FPv%	Count												
Party	Candidate	FPv%	1	2	3	4	5	6	7	8	9	10	11	12	13
Fine Gael	Senator Mary Jackman*	14.93	1,841												
Fianna Fáil	Eddie Wade*	12.56	1,549												
Fianna Fáil	Joe Meagher	8.12	1,001	1,005	1,008	1,020	1,042	1,053	1,066	1,116	1,160	1,177	1,274	1,281	1,282
Fine Gael	Paddy Hourigan*	7.29	899	948	952	980	1,013	1,046	1,126	1,226	1,273	1,459	1,563		
Fianna Fáil	Noreen Ryan	6.58	812	825	830	838	874	952	1,034	1,217	1,272	1,314	1,381	1,384	1,386
Progressive Democrats	Brigid Teefy	6.44	794	815	822	859	917	973	1,022	1,058	1,304	1,468	1,535	1,537	1,539
Fianna Fáil	Noel Gleeson*	6.13	756	766	768	779	844	866	884	978	1,016	1,064	1,272	1,274	1,276
Fine Gael	Mary Harty	5.76	710	754	758	788	816	835	884	893	966	1,122	1,323	1,331	
Independent	Patrick Coffey	5.55	685	692	700	726	763	791	831	845	865	910			
Fine Gael	Leo Walsh	4.77	588	623	636	663	676	716	759	792	836				
Fianna Fáil	Eamon Lawlor	4.33	534	544	547	551	567	602	641						
Progressive Democrats	Damien O'Dwyer	3.97	489	504	515	536	602	637	680	696					
Labour	Niall Greene	3.77	465	489	515	526	536	589							
Independent	John Redington	3.46	427	471	491	508	515								
Progressive Democrats	Martin Ryan	3.32	410	419	424	429									
Independent	P.J. O'Donnell	2.04	251	259	263										
Green	Aine McCarthy	0.98	121	127											
Electorate: 22,243 Valid: 12,332 (55.44%) Spoilt: 108 Quota: 1,542 Turnout: 12,440 (55.93%)

=== Kilmallock ===
Kilmallock - 4 seats
Party	Candidate	FPv%	Count				
Party	Candidate	FPv%	1	2	3	4	5
Independent	John Gallahue	20.97	1,824				
Fine Gael	Jim Houlihan*	16.05	1,396	1,406	1,627	1,772	
Fianna Fáil	Pat McAuliffe	15.59	1,356	1,363	1,407	1,620	1,795
Progressive Democrats	Eddie Creighton*	15.21	1,323	1,339	1,504	1,530	1,705
Fianna Fáil	Mary O'Brien	10.32	898	923	945	1,018	1,401
Fianna Fáil	Eddie Ryan	9.66	840	857	885	912	
Fianna Fáil	Tom Lenihan	6.22	541	545	560		
Fine Gael	Joe Wheeler	5.99	521	526			
Electorate: 13,808 Valid: 8,699 (63.00%) Spoilt: 120 Quota: 1,740 Turnout: 8,819 (63.87%)

=== Newcastle West ===
Newcastle West - 5 seats
Party	Candidate	FPv%	Count			
Party	Candidate	FPv%	1	2	3	4
Fine Gael	Michael Finucane TD*	22.10	1,903			
Fianna Fáil	Senator John Cregan*	16.78	1,445			
Fianna Fáil	Michael O'Kelly*	13.10	1,128	1,144	1,176	1,323
Fianna Fáil	Seamus Ahern	12.81	1,103	1,138	1,195	1,463
Fine Gael	Seán Broderick*	12.78	1,098	1,326	1,401	1,461
Independent	Joseph Mullane	8.84	761	832	937	1,117
Fianna Fáil	Michael Healy*	8.56	737	825	876	
Sinn Féin	Coireall MacCurtain	4.19	361	378		
Green	Ted Bradley	0.86	74	86		
Electorate: 15,682 Valid: 8,610 (54.90%) Spoilt: 123 Quota: 1,436 Turnout: 8,733 (55.69%)

=== Rathkeale ===
Rathkeale - 5 seats
Party	Candidate	FPv%	Count		
Party	Candidate	FPv%	1	2	3
Fine Gael	Senator Dan Neville*	30.00	2,555		
Fianna Fáil	Kevin Sheahan*	16.06	1,368	1,501	
Fianna Fáil	John Cregan	15.08	1,284	1,379	1,446
Fine Gael	David Naughton*	14.79	1,260	1,855	
Fianna Fáil	John Griffin*	14.56	1,240	1,382	1,463
Fianna Fáil	Michael Mulcair	9.51	810	980	1,088
Electorate: 15,267 Valid: 8,517 (55.79%) Spoilt: 147 Quota: 1,420 Turnout: 8,664 (56.75%)
