= 2004 Limerick County Council election =

Part of the 2004 Irish local elections

- 11 June 2004

All 28 seats on Limerick County Council
	First party	Second party	Third party
Party	Fianna Fáil	Fine Gael	Progressive Democrats
Seats won	12	12	3
Seat change	-2	+2	-
	Fourth party	Fifth party
Party	Labour	Independent
Seats won	1	0
Seat change	+1	-1
- Map showing the area of Limerick County Council
Council control after election
TBD

An election to Limerick County Council took place on 11 June 2004 as part of that year's Irish local elections. 28 councillors were elected from five local electoral areas (LEAs) for a five-year term of office on the electoral system of proportional representation by means of the single transferable vote (PR-STV).

== Results by party ==
Party	Seats	±	First Pref. votes	FPv%	±%
Fianna Fáil	12	-2	23,157	39.13	
Fine Gael	12	+2	22,841	38.60	
Progressive Democrats	3	-	4,681	7.91	
Labour	1	+1	2,279	3.85	
Independent	0	-1	4,121	6.96	
Totals	28	-	59,175	100.00	—

== Results by local electoral area ==
=== Bruff ===
Bruff - 7 seats
Party	Candidate	FPv%	Count											
Party	Candidate	FPv%	1	2	3	4	5	6	7	8	9	10	11	12
Fine Gael	Richard Butler*	14.04	1,954											
Fianna Fáil	Niall Collins	11.49	1,600	1,637	1,648	1,657	1,673	1,685	1,698	1,768				
Fine Gael	Cormac Hurley*	7.96	1,108	1,144	1,148	1,175	1,264	1,362	1,453	1,457	1,489	1,555	1,744	
Fianna Fáil	Leonard Enright*	7.72	1,075	1,086	1,096	1,101	1,108	1,114	1,123	1,197	1,298	1,350	1,438	1,510
Fianna Fáil	John Clifford*	6.61	920	922	1,004	1,009	1,011	1,017	1,023	1,086	1,169	1,207	1,222	1,454
Progressive Democrats	Rose Brennan*	6.49	904	911	921	925	929	960	965	1,113	1,196	1,440	1,662	1,855
Labour	Deirdre Ní Chinneide	6.34	883	908	912	938	954	970	1,220	1,225	1,270	1,407	1,440	1,566
Fianna Fáil	Sandra Marsh*	5.55	772	778	784	798	828	935	981	999	1,025	1,100	1,131	1,174
Fine Gael	Gerard Murnane	4.76	663	678	736	747	782	786	792	801	860	899	1,070	
Fine Gael	Tom P. Healy	4.53	631	665	668	675	694	695	704	802	848	866		
Progressive Democrats	Sinead Teefy	4.40	613	631	659	671	676	736	762	776	817			
Independent	Patrick Fitzgerald	3.99	556	560	562	623	636	642	658	680				
Fianna Fáil	James Cavanagh	3.99	555	557	559	559	559	562	563					
Labour	Karan O'Loughlin	3.08	429	432	437	468	508	545						
Progressive Democrats	Pat Hennessy*	2.79	388	391	398	413	428							
Fine Gael	Tina O'Gorman	2.41	335	342	343	351								
Independent	Denis Riordan	1.95	271	274	277									
Progressive Democrats	George O'Leary	1.90	264	264										
Electorate: 23,618 Valid: 13,921 (58.94%) Spoilt: 253 Quota: 1,741 Turnout: 14,174 (60.01%)

=== Castleconnell ===
Castleconnell - 7 seats
Party	Candidate	FPv%	Count								
Party	Candidate	FPv%	1	2	3	4	5	6	7	8	9
Fine Gael	Mary Jackman*	14.60	2,119								
Fianna Fáil	Eddie Wade*	14.35	2,083								
Progressive Democrats	Brigid Teefy*	10.25	1,487	1,516	1,599	1,606	1,648	1,675	1,715	1,829	
Fianna Fáil	Joe Meagher*	9.08	1,318	1,322	1,347	1,350	1,366	1,461	1,470	1,485	1,534
Fianna Fáil	Noel Gleeson	8.92	1,294	1,300	1,336	1,344	1,360	1,414	1,430	1,467	1,692
Fine Gael	Kieran O'Donnell	8.01	1,163	1,259	1,274	1,289	1,316	1,329	1,390	1,528	1,776
Fianna Fáil	Noreen Ryan*	8.01	1,163	1,184	1,220	1,226	1,289	1,311	1,342	1,405	1,601
Fine Gael	Mary Harty*	7.43	1,079	1,128	1,143	1,156	1,163	1,253	1,293	1,419	1,732
Fine Gael	Paddy Hourigan*	7.37	1,069	1,111	1,125	1,131	1,140	1,154	1,180	1,231	
Green	Trish Forde-Brennan	3.71	539	564	569	604	619	624	842		
Labour	Manus Bree	3.27	474	490	494	522	538	546			
Fianna Fáil	Tim Long	2.24	325	328	344	347	360				
Fianna Fáil	Ursula Stokes	1.62	235	246	262	266					
Independent	Seán Gilmour	1.14	166	168	171						
Electorate: 25,025 Valid: 14,514 (58.00%) Spoilt: 253 Quota: 1,815 Turnout: 14,767 (59.01%)

=== Kilmallock ===
Kilmallock - 4 seats
Party	Candidate	FPv%	Count							
Party	Candidate	FPv%	1	2	3	4	5	6	7	8
Fianna Fáil	John Gallahue*	17.43	1,715	1,725	1,803	1,835	1,896	1,916	2,196	
Fine Gael	Jim Houlihan*	14.25	1,402	1,427	1,468	1,745	2,105			
Fianna Fáil	Pat McAuliffe*	13.78	1,356	1,376	1,424	1,470	1,562	1,600	1,858	1,928
Progressive Democrats	Eddie Creighton*	13.10	1,289	1,296	1,338	1,386	1,414	1,435	1,616	1,668
Fianna Fáil	Eddie Ryan	12.58	1,238	1,242	1,293	1,327	1,345	1,367	1,549	1,603
Independent	Pat Heffernan	9.32	917	950	1,073	1,146	1,266	1,301		
Independent	Brendan Danaher	7.17	706	723	753	813				
Fine Gael	Thomas Blackburne	5.73	564	577	604					
Sinn Féin	Noel Hanley	2.91	286	303						
Labour	Thomas Rea	2.03	200	207						
Independent	James Coll	1.71	168							
Electorate: 15,225 Valid: 9,841 (64.64%) Spoilt: 161 Quota: 1,969 Turnout: 10,002 (65.69%)

=== Newcastle West ===
Newcastle West - 5 seats
Party	Candidate	FPv%	Count									
Party	Candidate	FPv%	1	2	3	4	5	6	7	8	9	10
Fine Gael	Patrick O'Donovan*	13.26	1,485	1,492	1,518	1,552	1,566	1,654	1,707	1,757	1,932	
Fine Gael	Liam Galvin	11.74	1,315	1,335	1,346	1,406	1,412	1,459	1,489	1,523	1,576	1,959
Fianna Fáil	Michael J. Collins	10.72	1,200	1,212	1,233	1,251	1,284	1,390	1,460	1,610	1,762	1,818
Fianna Fáil	Seamus Ahern*	10.20	1,142	1,149	1,152	1,161	1,170	1,200	1,223	1,275	1,305	1,386
Fianna Fáil	Francis Foley	9.35	1,047	1,056	1,063	1,102	1,110	1,153	1,180	1,261	1,358	1,574
Fine Gael	Jerome Scanlan	9.24	1,035	1,038	1,045	1,058	1,160	1,202	1,327	1,455	1,557	1,681
Fine Gael	Maurice Hartnett	7.78	871	890	893	943	963	996	1,014	1,036	1,075	
Independent	Joseph Mullane	5.19	581	588	602	617	641	720	800	842		
Fianna Fáil	Vincent Kiely	4.88	547	548	551	555	606	624	661			
Independent	Marian Collins	4.47	501	517	527	542	564					
Independent	John Leahy	3.78	423	425	427	433						
Sinn Féin	Coireall MacCurtain	3.66	410	416	497	510	605	623				
Labour	Denis Hobson	2.62	293	310	311							
Sinn Féin	Mike MacDomhnaill	1.75	196	201								
Green	Eamon Collins	1.37	153									
Electorate: 17,522 Valid: 11,199 (63.91%) Spoilt: 182 Quota: 1,867 Turnout: 11,381 (64.95%)

=== Rathkeale ===
Rathkeale - 5 seats
Party	Candidate	FPv%	Count			
Party	Candidate	FPv%	1	2	3	4
Fine Gael	Tom Neville*	24.71	2,599			
Fine Gael	David Naughton*	13.05	1,373	1,595	1,761	
Fianna Fáil	Kevin Sheahan*	12.85	1,352	1,434	1,525	1,824
Fianna Fáil	John Griffin*	10.80	1,136	1,208	1,283	1,527
Fianna Fáil	John Cregan*	10.30	1,084	1,131	1,252	
Fine Gael	John Sheahan	10.26	1,079	1,205	1,381	1,789
Fine Gael	Stephen Keary	9.48	997	1,210	1,346	1,408
Green	Pat Culhane	4.87	512	576		
Independent	Paudie Mulvihil	3.69	388	407		
Electorate: 16,697 Valid: 10,520 (63.01%) Spoilt: 174 Quota: 1,754 Turnout: 10,694 (64.05%)
