= 2014 Limerick City and County Council election =

Part of the 2014 Irish local elections

- 23 May 2014

All 40 seats on Limerick City and County Council
	First party	Second party	Third party
Party	Fianna Fáil	Fine Gael	Sinn Féin
Seats won	13	12	6
	Fourth party	Fifth party	Sixth party
Party	Labour	Anti-Austerity Alliance	Independent
Seats won	3	3	3
- Map showing the area of Limerick City and County Council
Council control before election
Fine Gael
Labour Party
Council control after election
Fine Gael
Labour Party

An election to all 40 seats on Limerick City and County Council took place on 23 May 2014 as part of the 2014 Irish local elections, a reduction from an overall total of 45 seats at the previous elections (17 at the 2009 City Council election) and 28 at the 2009 County Council election). It was a new local authority replacing the abolished Limerick City Council and Limerick County Council. Limerick City and County was divided into 6 local electoral areas (LEAs) to elect 40 councillors for a five-year term of office on the electoral system of proportional representation by means of the single transferable vote (PR-STV).

Significantly Fianna Fáil emerged as the largest party on the council despite being 3,838 first preference votes behind Fine Gael. The party won seats in Limerick city, historically a weak area for them in local elections. Its best results were in Cappaghmore–Kilmallock and Limerick City East where they secured 3 seats in each LEA. Fine Gael were disadvantaged by the merger of the 2 local authorities as they held many councillors on the old City Council and several of these Councillors were defeated under the new boundaries. However, the party won 3 seats in Newcastle West. It was a very poor election for Labour as they just returned 1 seat in each of the 3 city LEAs just as did the Anti-Austerity Alliance. Sinn Féin won 6 seats, to join their existing member Maurice Quinlivan. Independents secured the remaining 3 seats, 1 of which was Emmett O'Brien a former member of the Fianna Fáil National Executive. After the elections 4 of the Fianna Fáil members broke away to form an independent block over an internal disagreement over who should secure the Chairmanship of the council. This was later resolved after intercession by Party Headquarters and they rejoined the Fianna Fáil grouping.

== Results by party ==
Party	Seats	±	1st pref	FPv%	±%
Fianna Fáil	13		19,680	27.4	
Fine Gael	12		23,518	32.7	
Sinn Féin	6		9,298	12.9	
Labour	3		4,760	6.6	
Anti-Austerity Alliance	3		3,136	4.4	
Independent	3		11,456	15.9	
Total	40		71,848	100.0	—

== Results by local electoral area ==
*: Outgoing councillor.

=== Adare–Rathkeale ===
Adare-Rathkeale: 6 seats
Party	Candidate	FPv%	Count							
Party	Candidate	FPv%	1	2	3	4	5	6	7	8
Independent	Emmett O'Brien	18.4%	2,270							
Fine Gael	Tom Neville	15.2%	1,873							
Fine Gael	Stephen Keary	13.7%	1,688	1,761	1,800					
Fianna Fáil	Kevin Sheahan	9.9%	1,229	1,334	1,343	1,366	1,444	1,618	1,621	1,749
Sinn Féin	Ciara McMahon	8.3%	1,027	1,110	1,118	1,247	1,302	1,360	1,361	1,527
Fianna Fáil	Richard O'Donoghue	7.4%	912	942	949	963	1,224	1,445	1,449	1,718
Fianna Fáil	James Cavanagh	6.3%	777	813	819	831	891			
Fine Gael	Rose Brennan	6.2%	766	811	840	867	940	1,138	1,156	1,375
Fianna Fáil	Séamus Sheahan	5.9%	736	749	753	772				
Independent	Patrick Fitzgerald	5.7%	704	783	789	888	1,055	1,144	1,146	
Anti-Austerity Alliance	Kathleen Enright	2.8%	350	394	397					
Electorate: 23,045 Valid: 12,332 Spoilt: 118 Quota: 1,762 Turnout: 12,450 (54.02%)

=== Cappamore–Kilmallock ===
Cappamore–Kilmallock: 7 seats
Party	Candidate	FPv%	Count					
Party	Candidate	FPv%	1	2	3	4	5	6
Independent	Brigid Teefy	16.04%	2,369					
Fianna Fáil	Eddie Ryan	14.7%	2,178					
Sinn Féin	Lisa-Marie Sheehy	12.8%	1,889					
Fianna Fáil	Noel Gleeson	9.5%	1,399	1,488	1,554	1,559	1,893	
Fianna Fáil	Mike Donegan	9.1%	1,339	1,374	1,467	1,474	1,548	1,825
Fine Gael	Gerard Mitchell	8.6%	1,272	1,367	1,426	1,430	1,525	1,713
Fine Gael	John Egan	7.9%	1,165	1,242	1,251	1,254	1,355	1,509
Fine Gael	William O'Donnell	7.5%	1,108	1,186	1,224	1,227	1,271	1,669
Fine Gael	Mike Houlihan	7.3%	1,071	1,101	1,141	1,148	1,208	
Independent	Joe Meagher	6.7%	982	1,100	1,125	1,139		
Electorate: 27,485 Valid: 14,772 Spoilt: 187 Quota: 1,847 Turnout: 14,959 (54.4%)

=== Limerick City East ===
Limerick City East: 8 seats
Party	Candidate	FPv%	Count														
Party	Candidate	FPv%	1	2	3	4	5	6	7	8	9	10	11	12	13	14	15
Sinn Féin	Seighin O Ceallaigh	14.3%	1,703														
Fianna Fáil	Shane Clifford	11.2%	1,338														
Fianna Fáil	Kieran O'Hanlon	8.2%	975	995	999	1,020	1,047	1,073	1,132	1,196	1,257	1,350					
Fine Gael	Michael Sheahan	7.7%	924	929	930	930	932	941	1,009	1,015	1,024	1,108	1,109	1,113	1,113	1,115	1,312
Labour	Elena Secas	7.3%	867	878	878	938	943	972	1,020	1,029	1,064	1,139	1,143	1,162	1,164	1,165	1,229
Fine Gael	Marian Hurley	6.5%	772	775	775	777	781	788	866	874	916	990	992	994	995	996	1,200
Fine Gael	Leo Walsh	5.9%	709	713	721	723	725	733	745	758	782	851	851	860	860	861	
Fianna Fáil	Jerry O'Dea	5.2%	619	636	641	658	669	691	760	792	862	917	925	953	955	959	1,113
Anti-Austerity Alliance	Paul Keller	4.5%	540	614	618	631	676	707	718	781	823	846	847	1,345			
Fine Gael	Diarmuid Scully	4.2%	499	506	506	514	519	533	542	583	659						
Independent	Sarah Jane Hennelly	3.9%	467	484	487	492	543	629	651	714	752	789	791	856	868	869	911
Fianna Fáil	Joe Pond	3.8%	455	463	464	467	469	469									
Anti-Austerity Alliance	Derek Towell	3.7%	442	536	538	552	587	624	637	673	716	758	762				
Fine Gael	Sarah Lee Kiely	3.6%	427	445	449	472	495	529	535	554							
Independent	Jim Hickey	3.2%	384	400	400	409	447	482	491								
Independent	Orla McLoughlin	2.6%	313	345	350	370	388										
Independent	Noel Hannon	1.9%	236	268	274	295											
Labour	Derek Mulcahy	1.9%	234	243	243												
Independent	Richie Smith	0.4%	43	51													
Electorate: 27,654 Valid: 11,947 Spoilt: 167 Quota: 1,328 Turnout: 12,114 (43.8%)

=== Limerick City North ===
Limerick City North- 6 seats
Party	Candidate	FPv%	Count										
Party	Candidate	FPv%	1	2	3	4	5	6	7	8	9	10	11
Sinn Féin	Maurice Quinlivan	24.5%	2,456										
Fine Gael	Michael Hourigan	12.4%	1,249	1,278	1,281	1,294	1,301	1,341	1,348	1,426	1,628		
Labour	Frankie Daly	10.1%	1,014	1,179	1,195	1,201	1,225	1,289	1,303	1,336	1,398	1,454	
Fianna Fáil	Joe Crowley	10.1%	1,014	1,053	1,057	1,065	1,075	1,085	1,200	1,251	1,284	1,296	1,362
Anti-Austerity Alliance	Cian Prendeville	9.6%	964	1,277	1,288	1,312	1,350	1,368	1,393	1,423	1,448		
Independent	John Gilligan	8.3%	831	1,036	1,045	1,060	1,100	1,116	1,156	1,207	1,265	1,288	1,446
Independent	Gerry McLoughlin	4.99%	501	569	584	600	623	644	664	703	740	753	880
Fine Gael	Denis McCarthy	4.3%	430	440	445	446	457	488	512	525			
Labour	Tom Shortt	4.2%	426	456	456	462	472	489	504	535	578	618	
Independent	Desmond Hayes	3.3%	334	349	354	368	383	391	397				
Fianna Fáil	Christy McInerney	2.7%	268	289	289	289	293	297					
Fine Gael	Tina O'Gorman	1.9%	195	233	242	243	258						
Independent	Frank Ryan	1.7%	169	213	214	235							
Independent	Denis Riordan	1.2%	125	139	139								
Independent	Patrick McCarthy	0.7%	65	93									
Electorate: 20,980 Valid: 10,041 Spoilt: 150 Quota: 1,435 Turnout: 10,191 (48.6%)

=== Limerick City West ===
Limerick City West: 7 seats
Party	Candidate	FPv%	Count												
Party	Candidate	FPv%	1	2	3	4	5	6	7	8	9	10	11	12	13
Fianna Fáil	James Collins	14.9%	1,445												
Fine Gael	Maria Byrne	14.1%	1,370												
Labour	Joe Leddin	14.1%	1,154	1,176	1,208	1,213									
Sinn Féin	Malachy McCreesh	9.8%	952	960	963	963	968	982	992	1,029	1,043	1,073	1,097	1,149	1,191
Fine Gael	Daniel Butler	7.4%	721	748	790	809	824	827	841	860	974	1,036	1,179	1,247	
Anti-Austerity Alliance	John Loftus	6.6%	642	650	654	656	670	698	722	761	770	800	821	938	991
Fianna Fáil	Seán Lynch	5.4%	519	576	581	583	586	599	605	614	630	653	669	701	919
Fine Gael	Fergus Kilcoyne	5.3%	516	526	541	548	550	569	575	579	628	654	692	713	771
Fianna Fáil	Geraldine Leddin	4.1%	394	458	469	473	481	483	492	500	515	554	592	619	
Labour	Tomás Hannon	3.8%	369	382	388	390	394	394	408	416	440	461			
Independent	Richie Ryan	3.3%	319	325	328	338	351	371	393	469	477	502	541		
Fine Gael	Jim Long	3.1%	300	303	315	320	325	330	332	341	364				
Fine Gael	Felim Cronin	2.8%	275	279	290	295	297	299	300	302					
Independent	Cathal McCarthy	2.02%	196	198	199	200	211	236	265						
Independent	Sunny Martins Duruagwu	1.9%	183	186	188	190	205	215							
Independent	Jason Griffin	1.5%	144	145	146	161	161								
Independent	Gerry Casey	1.3%	124	127	131	131									
Fine Gael	Frank Mulqueen	0.7%	63	66	73										
Electorate: 20,242 Valid: 9,686 Spoilt: 98 Quota: 1,211 Turnout: 9,784 (48.3%)

=== Newcastle West ===
Newcastle West: 6 seats
Party	Candidate	FPv%	Count						
Party	Candidate	FPv%	1	2	3	4	5	6	7
Fine Gael	Jerome Scanlan	18.3%	2,396						
Fine Gael	Liam Galvin	13.7%	1,795	1,860	1,888				
Fianna Fáil	Michael J. Collins	12.9%	1,682	1,772	1,905				
Sinn Féin	Séamus Browne	9.7%	1,271	1,296	1,390	1,394	1,467	1,674	1,814
Fianna Fáil	Francis Foley	8.5%	1,112	1,144	1,188	1,201	1,279	1,400	1,772
Fine Gael	John Sheahan	7.9%	1,027	1,077	1,096	1,097	1,192	1,263	1,556
Fianna Fáil	Seamus Ahern	7.2%	941	947	987	997	1,090	1,148	
Fine Gael	Damien Riedy	6.9%	907	1,057	1,094	1,098	1,277	1,366	1,429
Labour	Stephen Goulding	5.3%	696	729	756	759			
Independent	Christy Kelly	4.99%	652	677	793	795	884		
Fianna Fáil	John Leahy	2.7%	348	391					
Anti-Austerity Alliance	Joe Harrington	1.5%	198	205					
Independent	Seán O'Mahony	0.3%	45	47					
Electorate: 21,891 Valid: 13,070 Spoilt: 143 Quota: 1,868 Turnout: 13,213 (60.4%)

== Changes ==
=== Co-options ===
Party	Outgoing	LEA	Reason	Date	Co-optee
Fianna Fáil	Shane Clifford	Limerick City East	Personal reasons.	31 December 2015	Joe Pond
Fianna Fáil	Joe Crowley	Limerick City North	Death.	15 February 2016	Vivienne Crowley
Fine Gael	Tom Neville	Adare–Rathkeale	Elected to the 32nd Dáil at the 2016 general election.	14 March 2016	Adam Teskey
Sinn Féin	Maurice Quinlivan	Limerick City North	Elected to the 32nd Dáil at the 2016 general election.	23 March 2016	Joe Costelloe
Fine Gael	Maria Byrne	Limerick City West	Elected to 25th Seanad at the 2016 Seanad election.	22 October 2016	Elenora Hogan
Anti-Austerity Alliance	Cian Prendeville	Limerick City North	Personal reasons.	27 October 2018	Mary Cahillane

=== Changes in affiliation ===
Name	LEA	Elected as	New affiliation	Date
John Loftus	Limerick City West	Anti-Austerity Alliance	Independent	27 August 2015
Richard O'Donoghue	Adare–Rathkeale	Fianna Fáil	Independent	14 December 2015
Lisa-Marie Sheehy	Cappamore-Kilmallock	Sinn Féin	Independent	5 September 2017
