= Richard O'Donoghue =

Irish politician (born 1970/1971)

Richard O'Donoghue TD
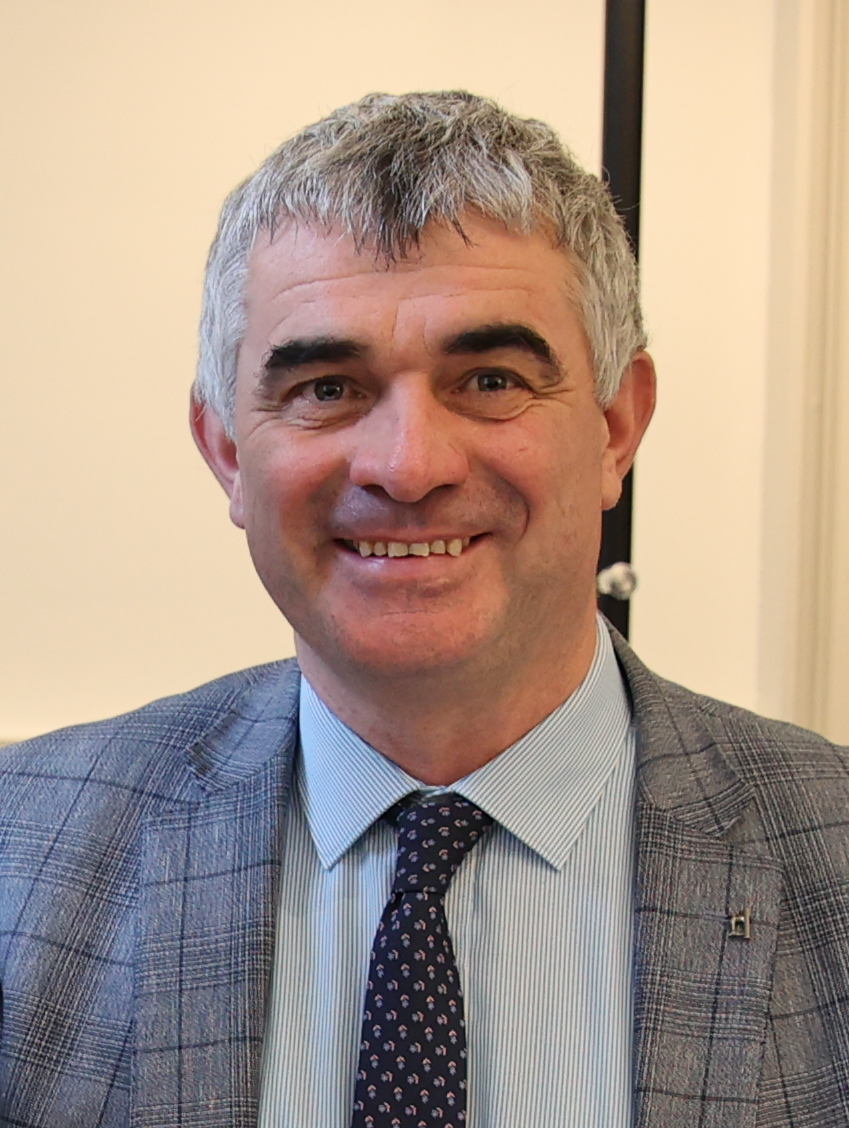
- O'Donoghue in 2024

Teachta Dála
- Incumbent
- Assumed office February 2020
- Constituency: Limerick County

General Secretary of Independent Ireland
- Incumbent
- Assumed office 10 November 2023
- Leader: Michael Collins
- Preceded by: New party

Personal details
- Born: 1970/1971 (age 55–56) Limerick, Ireland
- Party: Independent Ireland (since 2023)
- Other political affiliations: Independent (2015–2023); Fianna Fáil (until 2015)
- Spouse: Kay O'Donoghue
- Children: 4

Richard O'Donoghue (born 1970/1971) is an Irish politician who has been a Teachta Dála (TD) for the Limerick County constituency since the 2020 general election. Originally in Fianna Fáil, he was elected as an independent TD, and in 2023 he joined the newly formed Independent Ireland party.

== Political career ==
O'Donoghue is a self-employed building contractor.

He first stood for election in the 2009 local elections, when he was an unsuccessful Fianna Fáil candidate for Limerick County Council. At the 2014 local elections, he won a seat on the new Limerick City and County Council, but he left Fianna Fáil in December 2015 and sat as independent.

At the 2016 general election, O'Donoghue stood as an independent candidate in the Limerick County constituency. He won only 6.4% of the first-preference votes, and was not elected.

At the 2019 local elections, he was re-elected to the council, as an independent. At the 2020 general election, he won a seat in Dáil Éireann, ousting the sitting Fine Gael TD Tom Neville. He is the first independent TD to represent the Limerick County constituency. His brother, John O'Donoghue was co-opted to Richard O'Donoghue's seat on Limerick City and County Council following his election to the Dáil.

In 2020, it was reported that O'Donoghue had expressed concern over the speed of development of the COVID-19 vaccines and was quoted as saying that "at the moment I would not like to take it". However, he subsequently said that this was a misunderstanding, and that he was only temporarily unable to have the vaccination because of ongoing medical treatment but would have the vaccination once this was completed. He also asserted that a video circulating on the internet purportedly showing him to be anti-vaccination was faked.

In November 2023, he was named as the general secretary of Independent Ireland, a new political party led by Michael Collins, TD for Cork South-West.

He was re-elected in 2024, seeing a 60% increase in his vote share. He was subsequently appointed Cathaoirleach of the influential committee on budgetary oversight

== Personal life ==
O'Donoghue is married and has four children. He lives in the village of Granagh, County Limerick.

Dáil	Election	Deputy (Party)	Deputy (Party)	Deputy (Party)
32nd	2016	Niall Collins (FF)	Patrick O'Donovan (FG)	Tom Neville (FG)
33rd	2020	Niall Collins (FF)	Patrick O'Donovan (FG)	Richard O'Donoghue (Ind.)
34th	2024	Niall Collins (FF)	Patrick O'Donovan (FG)	Richard O'Donoghue (II)
