= 2004 Irish local elections =

Nationwide local authority elections

← 1999	11 June 2004	2009 →

1,627 County, City, Borough and Town Council Seats
- Turnout: 58.64% ▲8.45pp
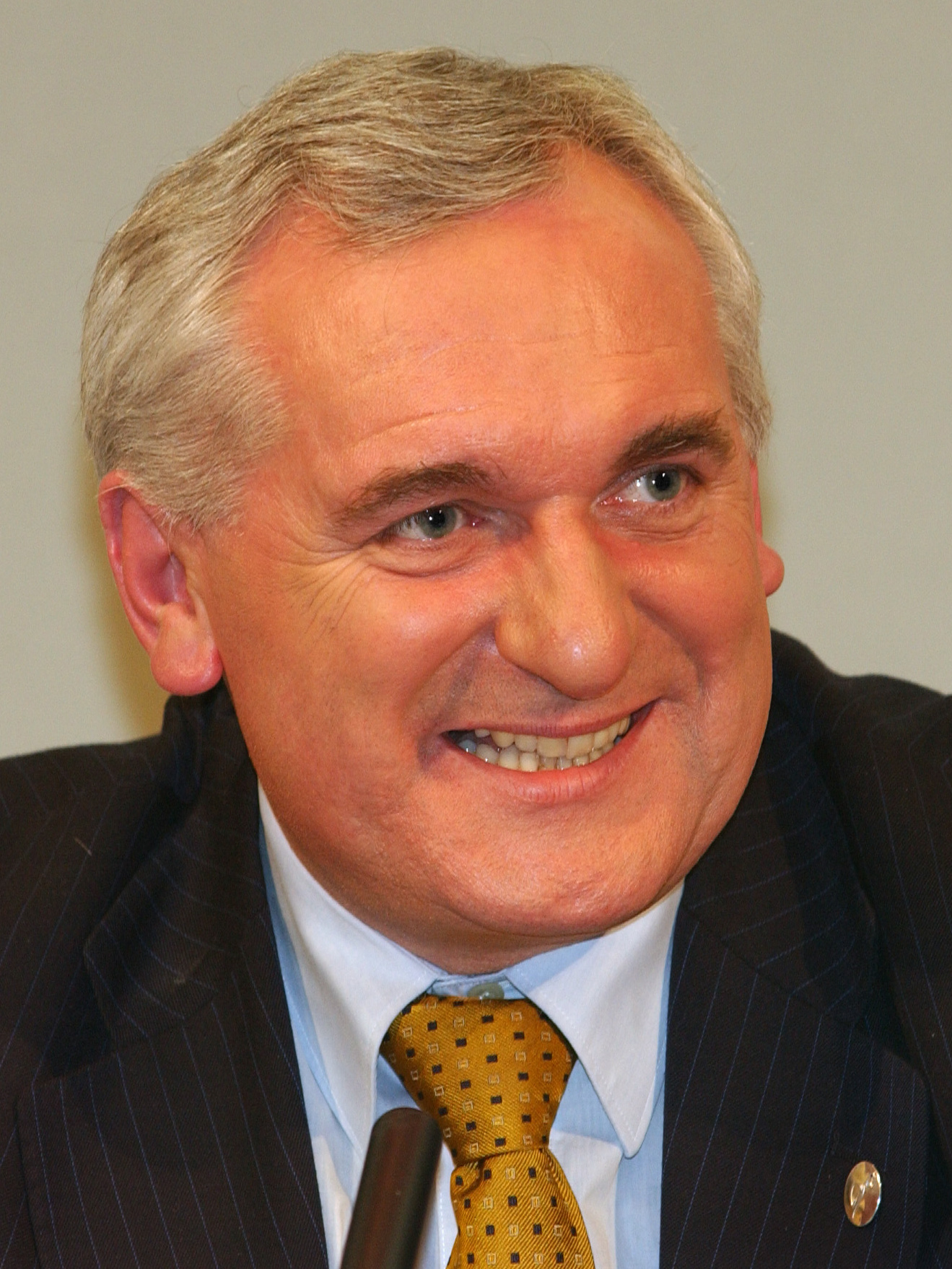

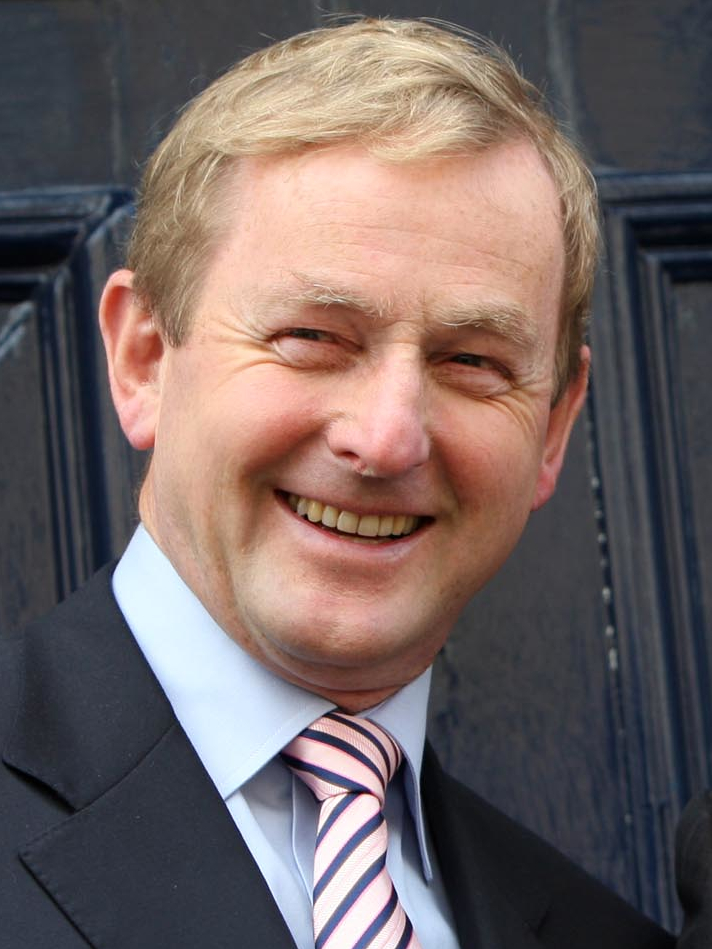

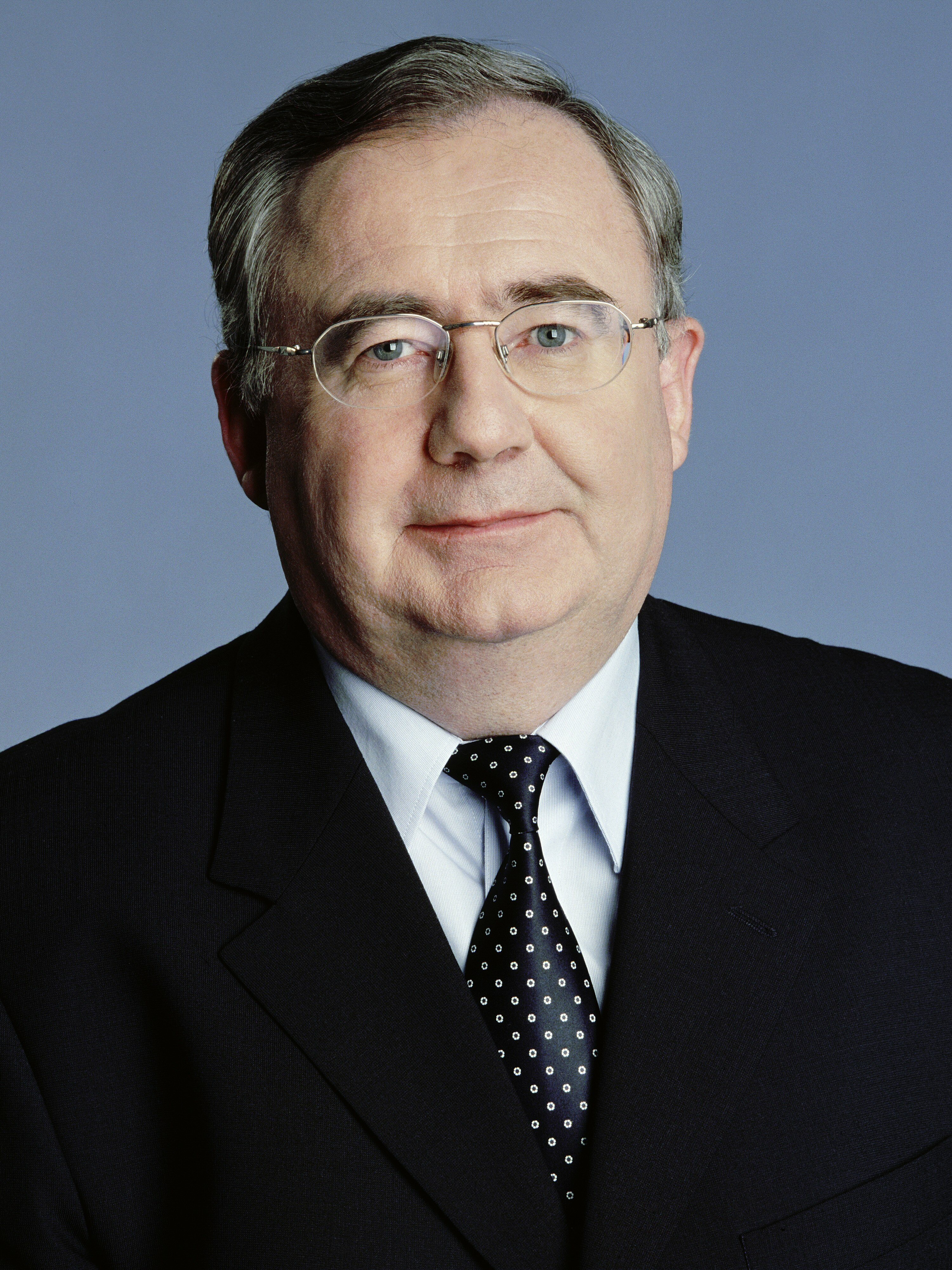

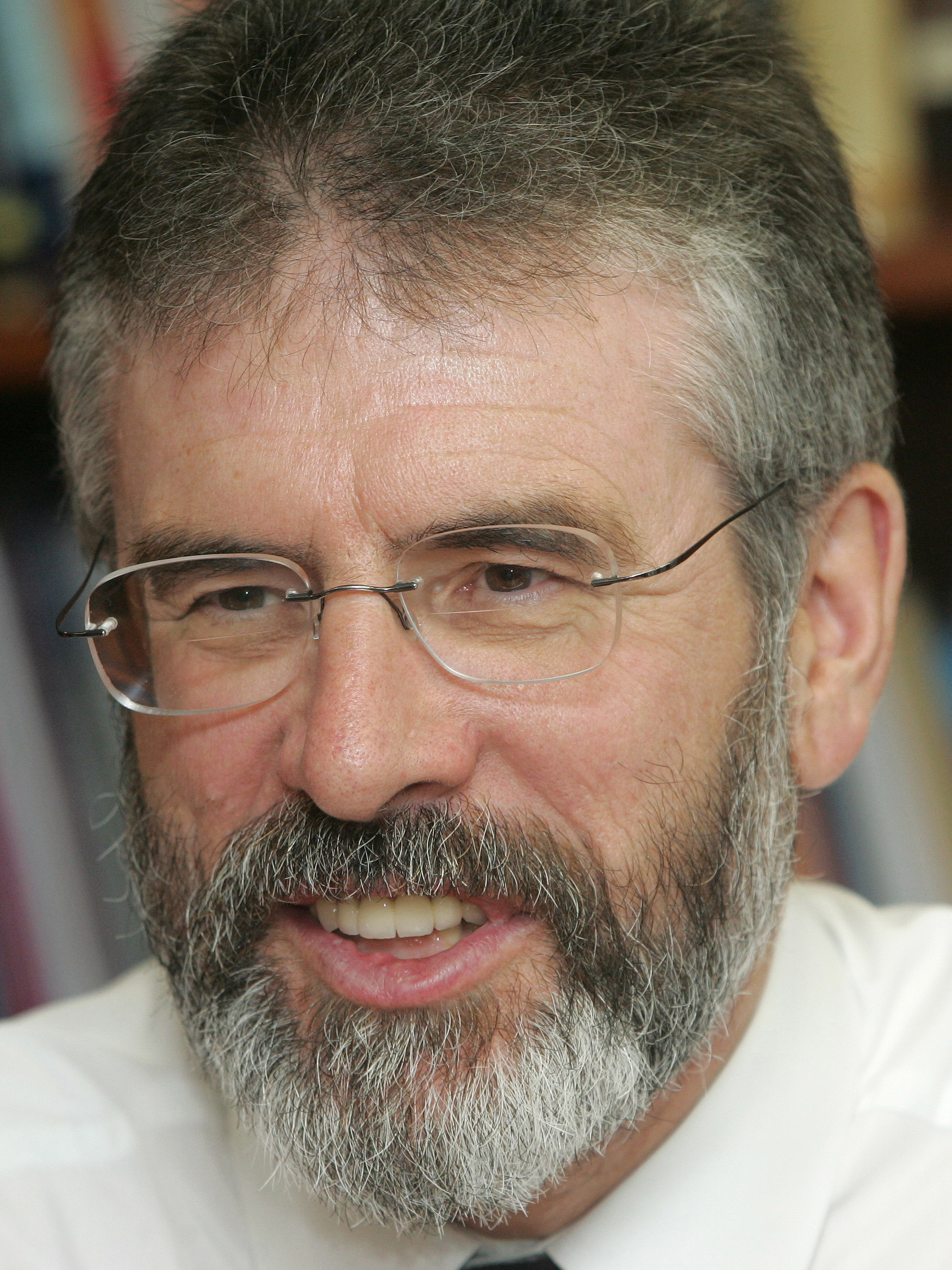

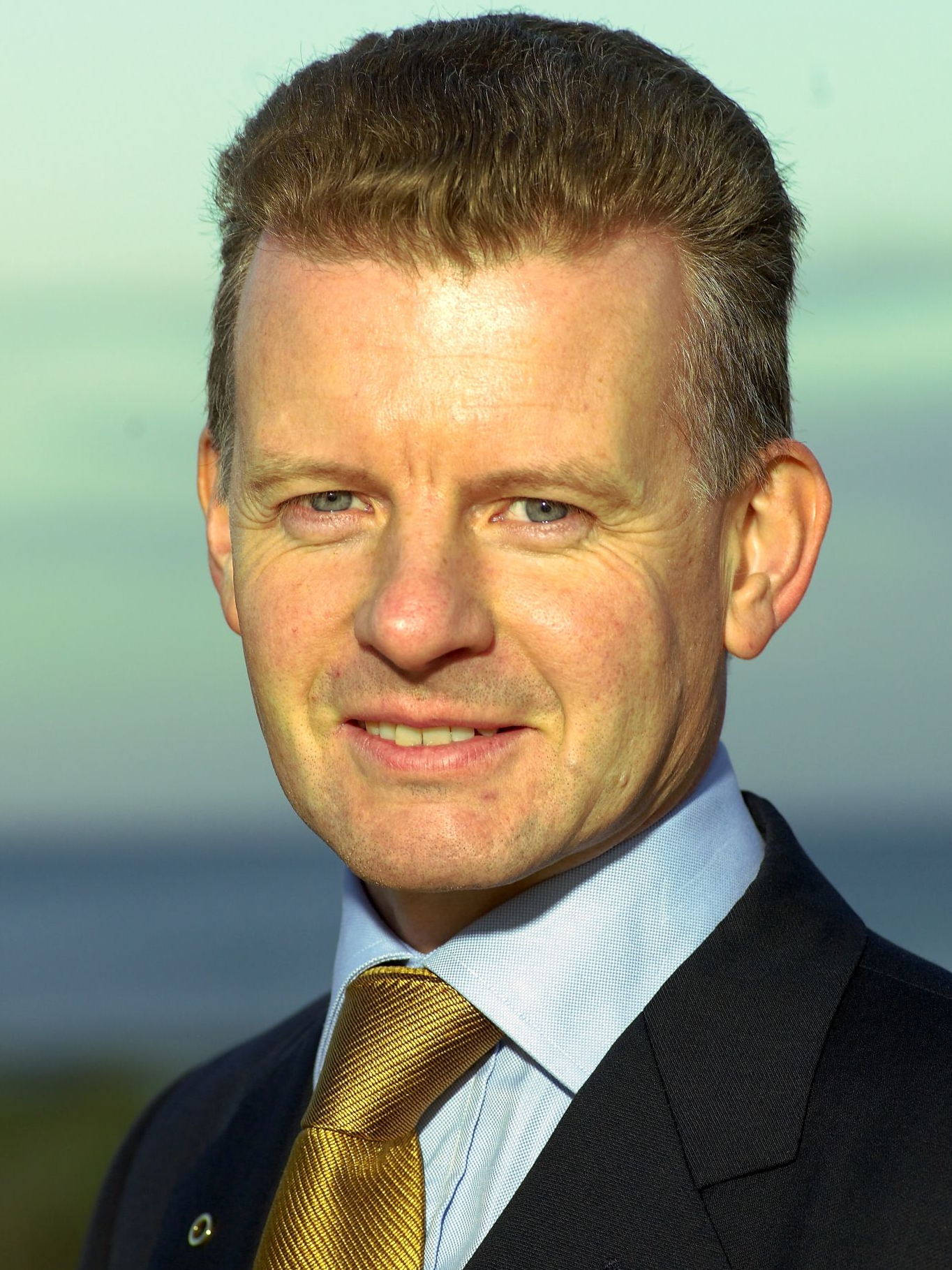

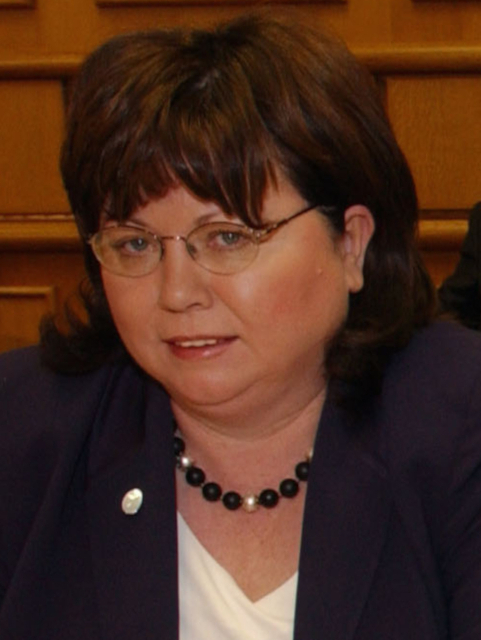
	First party	Second party	Third party
Leader	Bertie Ahern	Enda Kenny	Pat Rabbitte
Party	Fianna Fáil	Fine Gael	Labour
Leader since	19 November 1994	6 June 2002	13 October 2001
Percentage	31.8%	27.6%	14.2%
Largest Party on Council	16	10	4
Councillors	542	468	188
Councillors +/-	▼129	▲32	▲18
	Fourth party	Fifth party	Sixth party
Leader	Gerry Adams	Trevor Sargent	Mary Harney
Party	Sinn Féin	Green	Progressive Democrats
Leader since	13 November 1983	6 November 2001	26 October 1993
Percentage	8.1%	3.9%	3.9%
Largest Party on Council	1	N/A	N/A
Councillors	127	32	32
Councillors +/-	▲63	▲15	Steady

The 2004 Irish local elections were held in all the counties, cities and towns of Ireland on Friday, 11 June 2004, on the same day as the European elections and referendum on the amending the constitutional provisions on citizenship. Polling was delayed until 19 June 2004 in County Roscommon, due to the sudden death of Councillor Gerry Donnelly.

Turnout was the highest for 20 years at around 60%, helped by the extra publicity of the referendum. The result was a setback for Fianna Fáil, which saw its share of the vote drop by 7 percentage points from its 1999 result to 32%, losing 20% of its council seats. The party lost its majority on Clare County Council for the first time in 70 years, and fell behind Fine Gael in Galway, Limerick and Waterford city councils. Labour's share of the vote remained static at 11% while Fine Gael dropped 1%. However, both parties gained seats with the Labour Party becoming the largest party on Dublin City Council. Major gains were made by Sinn Féin which managed to double the number of seats it held, mainly at the expense of Fianna Fáil.

These were the first elections since the Local Government Act 2001 modernised council structures and abolished the dual mandate. Many new councillors were elected for the first time, including 33 of the 52 of the councillors on Dublin City Council, which the city manager described as "unprecedented in the history of local government". Many of the seats vacated by TDs and senators were won by family members.

== Results ==
Voters received different-coloured ballot papers for the European election, city/county council election, and referendum, all of which went into the same ballot box and were separated by colour once the boxes arrived at the count centre for the city/county. According to the different franchises in Irish law, all residents were eligible to vote in the local elections, all EU citizens were eligible to vote in the European elections, and the referendum was confined to Irish citizens. Voters in towns with town councils received an additional ballot for that election, cast in a separate ballot box and counted locally within the town.

=== County, city and town council seats ===
Party	Seats	±
Fianna Fáil	542	▼129
Fine Gael	468	▲32
Labour	188	▲18
Sinn Féin	125	▲63
Green	32	▲19
Progressive Democrats	32	Steady
Others	240	▼3
Total	1627	Steady

=== County and City Councils ===
Vote share of parties in the election for County and City Councils
1. Fianna Fáil (31.8%)
2. Fine Gael (27.6%)
3. Labour Party (11.4%)
4. Sinn Féin (8%)
5. Green Party (3.9%)
6. Progressive Democrats (3.8%)
7. Other (13.5%)

Party	Seats	±	1st pref	FPv%	±%
Fianna Fáil	302	▼80	578,139	31.8	▼7.1
Fine Gael	293	▲16	503,088	27.6	▼0.5
Labour	101	▲18	207,518	11.4	▲0.6
Sinn Féin	54	▲33	146,391	8.0	▲4.5
Progressive Democrats	19	▼6	69,650	3.8	▲0.9
Green	18	▲10	71,052	3.9	▲1.4
Socialist Party	4	▲2	13,494	0.7	▲0.3
Independent Fianna Fáil	2	▼2	9,356	0.5	Steady
Workers' Party	2	▼1	4,170	0.2	▼0.3
SKIA	1	Steady	1,618	0.1	Steady
Socialist Workers	0	Steady	6,125	0.3	+0.2
Republican Sinn Féin	0	▼1	2,036	0.1	—
Christian Solidarity	0	Steady	281	0.0	▼0.1
Independent	87	▲11	207,207	11.4	▼0.2
Total	883	Steady	1,820,125	100	—

County and City Council Seats
Political Parties	County council	City council
Fianna Fáil	274	28
Fine Gael	263	30
Labour Party	69	32
Sinn Féin	39	15
Progressive Democrats	14	5
Green Party	15	3
Other	85	11

Authority	FF	FG	Lab	PDs	GP	SF	IFF	WP	WUA	SKIA	Ind	Total	Details
Carlow	8	7	4	1	1	0	0	0	0	0	0	21	Details
Cavan	11	11	0	0	0	3	0	0	0	0	0	25	Details
Clare	13	10	1	0	1	0	0	0	0	0	7	32	Details
Cork City	11	8	6	1	1	2	0	0	0	0	2	31	Details
Cork County	16	24	5	1	0	2	0	0	0	0	2	48	Details
Donegal	14	8	0	0	0	4	2	0	0	0	1	29	Details
Dublin City	12	10	15	1	1	10	0	0	0	0	3	52	Details
Dún Laoghaire–Rathdown	7	9	6	1	4	0	0	0	0	0	1	28	Details
Fingal	4	5	6	1	3	1	0	0	0	0	4	24	Details
Galway City	2	3	4	3	1	1	0	0	0	0	1	15	Details
Galway County	10	10	1	3	0	1	0	0	0	0	5	30	Details
Kerry	11	8	2	0	0	2	0	0	0	1	3	27	Details
Kildare	10	7	4	0	1	0	0	0	0	0	3	25	Details
Kilkenny	8	11	5	0	1	0	0	0	0	0	1	26	Details
Laois	11	9	1	1	0	1	0	0	0	0	2	25	Details
Leitrim	10	8	0	0	0	2	0	0	0	0	2	22	Details
Limerick City	2	5	4	0	0	0	0	0	0	0	6	17	Details
Limerick County	12	12	1	3	0	0	0	0	0	0	0	28	Details
Longford	9	10	0	0	0	0	0	0	0	0	2	21	Details
Louth	9	7	1	0	0	5	0	0	0	0	4	26	Details
Mayo	12	15	1	0	0	1	0	0	0	0	2	31	Details
Meath	12	9	0	0	1	2	0	0	0	0	5	25	Details
Monaghan	5	7	0	0	0	7	0	0	0	0	1	20	Details
Offaly	8	6	0	2	0	0	0	0	0	0	5	21	Details
Roscommon	9	10	0	0	0	1	0	0	0	0	6	26	Details
Sligo	10	10	3	0	0	1	0	0	0	0	1	25	Details
South Dublin	6	3	7	2	2	3	0	0	0	0	3	26	Details
North Tipperary	10	5	2	0	0	0	0	0	0	0	4	21	Details
South Tipperary	10	8	2	0	0	0	0	0	3	0	3	26	Details
Waterford City	1	4	3	0	0	2	0	2	0	0	3	15	Details
Waterford County	7	11	4	0	0	1	0	0	0	0	0	23	Details
Westmeath	9	8	6	0	0	0	0	0	0	0	0	23	Details
Wexford	6	7	1	0	0	3	0	0	0	0	4	21	Details
Wicklow	6	7	6	0	1	0	0	0	0	0	4	24	Details

=== Borough and town councils ===
Party	Seats	±
Fianna Fáil	240	▼49
Fine Gael	175	▲16
Labour	87	Steady
Sinn Féin	71	▲30
Green	14	▲9
Progressive Democrats	13	▲6
Others	144	▼12
Total	744	Steady

==== Borough councils ====
Authority	FF	FG	Lab	SF	GP	PDs	Other
Clonmel	3	2	1			1	5 (Note: Includes 5 borough councillors for the Workers and Unemployed Action Group.)
Drogheda	3	2	2	2			3
Kilkenny	4	4	3		1		
Sligo	4	2	3	3			
Wexford	2	2	5	1			2
Total	16	12	14	6	1	1	10

==== Town councils ====
Town	FF	FG	Lab	SF	GP	PDs	Ind	Total
Ardee	2	3	1	1		1	1	9
Arklow	3	2	2				2	9
Athlone	4	2	1	1			1	9
Athy	2	3	3	1				9
Balbriggan	2	1	2		1	1	2	9
Ballina	4	2		1		1	1	9
Ballinasloe	3	1		1			4	9
Ballybay	3	3		2			1	9
Ballyshannon	3	4		1			1	9
Bandon	3	4		1			1	9
Bantry	4	3		1			1	9
Belturbet	4	3					2	9
Birr	2	3	1			1	2	9
Boyle	3	3	1				2	9
Bray	3	1	4	1	3			12
Buncrana	3	2		2			2	9
Bundoran	5	2		1	1			9
Carlow	3	3	2			1		9
Carrickmacross	3	2		3			1	9
Carrick-on-Suir	3	1	2	1			2	9
Cashel	2		1	1			5	9
Castlebar	3	3	1	1			1	9
Castleblayney	3	1		3			2	9
Cavan	4	3	1	1				9
Clonakilty	2	2		2			3	9
Clones	3	1		4			1	9
Cobh	1	2	3	1			2	9
Cootehill	3	3		2			1	9
Dundalk	3	2		3	1		3	12
Dungarvan	2	2	3	1			1	9
Edenderry	5	2				1	1	9
Ennis	3	2			1		3	9
Enniscorthy	3	2		1			3	9
Fermoy		1	1	1		1	5	9
Gorey	4	3	1	1				9
Granard	3	2	1				3	9
Greystones	3	3	1				2	9
Kells	4	1	2	1			1	9
Kilkee	5	2					2	9
Killarney	3	1	1				4 (Note: Michael Gleeson of the South Kerry Independent Alliance is included in this total.)	9
Kilrush	4	1					4	9
Kinsale	2	4	1		1		1	9
Leixlip	2	2	2		1		2	9
Letterkenny	4	1		1	1		2	9
Lismore	4	3	1				1	9
Listowel	4	3	1	1				9
Longford	2	3		1		1	2	9
Loughrea	3	1				1	4	9
Macroom	2	4	2				1	9
Mallow	2	2	3	1			1	9
Midleton	3	2		1			3	9
Monaghan	3	2		4				9
Mountmellick	6	2					1	9
Muine Bheag	5	2	2					9
Mullingar	2	2	4				1	9
Naas	3	1	1		1	1	2	9
Navan	4	2		2			1	9
Nenagh	3	1	2	1			2	9
Newbridge	3	2	1			1	2	9
New Ross	4	2	2	1				9
Passage West	3	3		1	1		1	9
Portlaoise	3	3		1			2	9
Shannon	2	2	2				3	9
Skibbereen	2	3	2	1			1	9
Templemore	4	3					2	9
Thurles	1	1	2	1			4	9
Tipperary	2	2	1				4	9
Tralee	4	1	3	2			2	12
Tramore	3	3	1				2	9
Trim	2	2	1	1			3	9
Tuam	1	3				1	4	9
Tullamore	3	2	2				2	9
Westport	3	3		1			2	9
Wicklow	2	2	2	1			2	9
Youghal	3	2		2	1		1	9
