= 2004 Waterford County Council election =

Part of the 2004 Irish local elections

- 11 June 2004

All 23 seats on Waterford County Council
	First party	Second party	Third party
Party	Fine Gael	Fianna Fáil	Labour
Seats won	11	7	4
Seat change	+3	-4	+1
	Fourth party	Fifth party
Party	Sinn Féin	Independent
Seats won	1	0
Seat change	+1	-1
- Map showing the area of Waterford County Council
Council control after election
TBD

An election to Waterford County Council took place on 11 June 2004 as part of that year's Irish local elections. 23 councillors were elected from five local electoral areas (LEAs) for a five-year term of office on the electoral system of proportional representation by means of the single transferable vote (PR-STV).

== Results by party ==
Party	Seats	±	First Pref. votes	FPv%	±%
Fine Gael	11	+3	10,392	35.44	
Fianna Fáil	7	-4	10,747	36.65	
Labour	4	+1	4,291	16.63	
Sinn Féin	1	+1	865	2.95	
Independent	0	-1	2,208	7.53	
Totals	23	-	29,324	100.00	—

== Results by local electoral area ==
=== Dungarvan ===
Dungarvan - 7 seats
Party	Candidate	FPv%	Count														
Party	Candidate	FPv%	1	2	3	4	5	6	7	8	9	10	11	12	13	14	15
Fianna Fáil	Tom Cronin*	10.07	869	871	877	879	913	941	949	993	1,084						
Fine Gael	Tom Higgins*	9.13	788	797	822	858	912	931	1,007	1,065	1,103						
Fine Gael	Damien Geoghegan*	8.91	769	774	790	832	854	862	940	967	985	1,069	1,077	1,078	1,126		
Sinn Féin	Brendan Mansfield	7.67	662	669	686	702	709	719	726	744	791	819	821	876	888	893	895
Fine Gael	Pat Nugent	7.60	656	658	669	672	680	700	760	780	816	1,051	1,059	1,059	1,204		
Labour	Billy Kyne*	7.45	643	651	672	717	728	732	752	799	811	829	829	829	884	896	905
Labour	Fiachra O Ceillchair*	7.16	618	622	635	646	654	671	673	686	771	803	803	804	834	845	848
Fine Gael	Geraldine Veale*	6.10	527	531	535	536	539	594	625	642	666						
Labour	Teresa Wright	5.79	500	514	545	582	593	615	623	693	716	784	787	787	832	841	852
Fianna Fáil	Patrick Kenneally*	5.63	486	489	491	493	515	527	536	602	694	777	779	780			
Fianna Fáil	Seamus O'Donnell	5.13	443	446	452	453	464	468	476	526							
Fianna Fáil	Nuala Ryan*	4.36	376	379	397	401	444	455	471								
Fine Gael	Oliver Coffey	3.66	316	320	328	329	334	340									
Independent	Garry O'Halloran	2.75	237	241	247	247	248										
Fianna Fáil	Damien Dillon	2.62	226	231	244	246											
Labour	Lar Hart	2.51	217	222	227												
Independent	Mel Shanley	2.33	201	210													
Independent	Dan Dineen	1.15	99														
Electorate: 13,731 Valid: 8,633 (62.87%) Spoilt: 113 Quota: 1,080 Turnout: 8,746 (63.70%)

=== Kilmacthomas ===
Kilmacthomas - 3 seats
Party	Candidate	FPv%	Count		
Party	Candidate	FPv%	1	2	3
Fine Gael	Liam Brazil	27.78	1,094		
Fianna Fáil	Pat Leahy*	24.20	953	968	1,004
Labour	Ger Barron*	21.33	840	884	1,026
Fianna Fáil	Tom Cunningham*	19.73	777	803	854
Independent	Roisin O'Shea	6.96	274	298	
Electorate: 6,346 Valid: 3,938 (62.05%) Spoilt: 58 Quota: 985 Turnout: 3,996 (62.97%)

=== Lismore ===
Lismore - 4 seats
Party	Candidate	FPv%	Count					
Party	Candidate	FPv%	1	2	3	4	5	6
Fine Gael	Nora Flynn*	19.45	1,012	1,034	1,102			
Fianna Fáil	James Tobin*	16.35	851	876	890	897	927	1,049
Fianna Fáil	Kevin Wilkinson*	15.89	827	857	876	882	979	1,092
Fianna Fáil	Bernard Leddy	11.55	601	635	645	648	666	728
Fine Gael	Declan Doocey	11.01	573	609	673	690	853	983
Labour	John Pratt	9.03	470	486	514	523	608	
Fine Gael	Cathy McGrath	7.42	386	399	459	476		
Independent	John Cashman	5.34	278	297				
Independent	William Lane	3.96	206					
Electorate: 8,313 Valid: 5,204 (62.60%) Spoilt: 84 Quota: 1,041 Turnout: 5,288 (63.61%)

=== Suir ===
Suir - 3 seats
Party	Candidate	FPv%	Count				
Party	Candidate	FPv%	1	2	3	4	5
Fine Gael	Mary Greene*	22.75	835	864	888	958	
Fine Gael	Paudie Coffey*	22.64	831	839	874	898	916
Fianna Fáil	Kieran O'Ryan*	21.69	796	815	833	911	924
Fianna Fáil	Liam Fogarty	10.93	401	412	437	508	516
Fianna Fáil	Niall Kirwan	6.59	242	224	256	267	
Labour	John Rockett	6.51	239	249	312	315	316
Sinn Féin	John Power	5.53	203	219			
Independent	Bobby Moore	3.35	123				
Electorate: 5,759 Valid: 3,670 (63.73%) Spoilt: 52 Quota: 918 Turnout: 3,722 (64.63%)

=== Tramore ===
Tramore - 6 seats
Party	Candidate	FPv%	Count							
Party	Candidate	FPv%	1	2	3	4	5	6	7	8
Fine Gael	John Carey*	14.20	1,119	1,144						
Fine Gael	Ann Marie Power	11.36	895	939	996	1,081	1,169			
Fianna Fáil	Pat Daly*	11.23	885	939	948	997	1,020	1,022	1,025	1,060
Fine Gael	Lola O'Sullivan*	10.38	818	846	922	973	1,100	1,120	1,126	
Labour	Paddy O'Callaghan	9.70	764	784	801	840	916	921	925	1,193
Fianna Fáil	Geoff Power*	9.04	712	720	731	746	780	782	784	861
Fianna Fáil	Dan Cowman*	8.43	664	682	695	812	860	867	869	929
Green	Michael Power	6.78	534	562	625	640	722	729	730	
Independent	Joe Conway	5.95	469	487	525	556				
Fianna Fáil	Blaise Hannigan	5.22	411	427	439					
Independent	Betty Twomey*	4.07	321	333						
Progressive Democrats	Paul Dunne	3.64	287							
Electorate: 13,607 Valid: 7,879 (57.90%) Spoilt: 153 Quota: 1,126 Turnout: 8,032 (59.03%)
