= Limerick County (Dáil constituency) =

Dáil constituency (2016–present)

- Dáil constituency
- Location of Limerick County within Ireland
- Interactive map of constituency boundaries since the 2024 general election
- Major settlements: Abbeyfeale; Kilmallock; Newcastle West; Rathkeale

Current constituency
- Created: 2016
- Seats: 3
- TDs: Niall Collins (FF); Richard O'Donoghue (II); Patrick O'Donovan (FG)
- Local government area: Limerick City and County
- Created from: Kerry North–West Limerick; Limerick
- EP constituency: South

Limerick County is a parliamentary constituency that has been represented in Dáil Éireann, the lower house of the Irish parliament or Oireachtas, since the 2016 general election. The constituency elects three deputies (Teachtaí Dála, commonly known as TDs) on the system of proportional representation by means of the single transferable vote (PR-STV).

== History and boundaries ==
The Constituency Commission proposed in its 2012 report that at the next general election a new constituency called Limerick County be created from territory then in the constituencies of Kerry North–West Limerick and Limerick. This was adopted under the Electoral (Amendment) (Dáil Constituencies) Act 2013 which came into effect at the 2016 general election. The Constituency Review Report 2023 of the Electoral Commission recommended that no change be made at the next general election.

For the 2024 general election, the Electoral (Amendment) Act 2023 defines the constituency as:

"The city and county of Limerick, except the parts thereof which are comprised in the constituency of Limerick City."

Changes to the Limerick County constituency
Years	TDs	Boundaries	Notes
2016–2020	3	The city and county of Limerick, except the parts in the constituency of Limerick City.	Created from Limerick constituency, with the additions of electoral divisions in County Limerick previously part of the Kerry North–West Limerick constituency; transfer of the electoral divisions of Abington, Ballybricken, Caherconlish East, Caherconlish West, Cappamore, Clonkeen, Doon West, Glenstal, Roxborough in the former rural district of Limerick No. 1, and Bilboa the former Tipperary No. 2 Rural District to the Limerick City constituency.
2020–	3	The city and county of Limerick, except the parts in the constituency of Limerick City.	Transfer of the electoral divisions of Cappamore, Doon West and Bilboa from the Limerick City constituency.

== TDs ==
Teachtaí Dála (TDs) for Limerick County 2016–
Key to parties: FF = Fianna Fáil; FG = Fine Gael; II = Independent Ireland; Ind = Independent
Dáil	Election	Deputy (Party)	Deputy (Party)	Deputy (Party)
32nd	2016	Niall Collins (FF)	Patrick O'Donovan (FG)	Tom Neville (FG)
33rd	2020	Niall Collins (FF)	Patrick O'Donovan (FG)	Richard O'Donoghue (Ind)
34th	2024	Niall Collins (FF)	Patrick O'Donovan (FG)	Richard O'Donoghue (II)

Note: The columns in this table are used only for presentational purposes, and no significance should be attached to the order of columns. For details of the order in which seats were won at each election, see the detailed results of that election.

== Elections ==
*: Outgoing TD

=== 2024 general election ===
2024 general election: Limerick County
Party	Candidate	FPv%	Count												
Party	Candidate	FPv%	1	2	3	4	5	6	7	8	9	10	11	12	13
Fine Gael	Patrick O'Donovan	25.4	11,563												
Independent Ireland	Richard O'Donoghue	23.2	10,540	10,576	10,591	10,640	10,663	10,782	10,815	11,034	11,468				
Fianna Fáil	Niall Collins	20.4	9,284	9,331	9,334	9,340	9,350	9,358	9,373	9,468	9,596	9,799	10,095	10,124	11,525
Sinn Féin	Joanne Collins	13.2	6,005	6,010	6,022	6,037	6,074	6,119	6,335	6,398	6,602	6,899	7,251	7,288	7,505
Fianna Fáil	Bridie Collins	3.7	1,687	1,695	1,697	1,699	1,706	1,713	1,722	1,750	1,809	1,947	2,088	2,096	
Fine Gael	Noreen Stokes	3.3	1,511	1,580	1,589	1,590	1,603	1,608	1,615	1,645	1,672	1,872	2,107	2,116	2,314
Aontú	Michael Ryan	2.9	1,309	1,312	1,315	1,348	1,362	1,458	1,474	1,510	1,571	1,647			
Independent	Jim Barrett	2.0	913	918	921	940	964	993	1,013	1,070					
Green	Rob O'Donnell	1.9	873	876	880	886	942	951	1,063	1,084	1,120				
Independent	Richie Crehan	1.2	565	566	568	578	584	602	611						
PBP–Solidarity	Laura Fahey (Note: Fahey is a member of People Before Profit.)	0.9	413	413	422	424	471	478							
The Irish People	Lorraine O'Sullivan	0.6	281	281	282	377	392								
Irish Freedom	Donna O'Loughlin	0.6	256	256	258										
Party for Animal Welfare	Gerben Uunk	0.6	254	255	266	277									
Independent	April Sheehan Corkery	0.2	82	82											
Electorate: 75,018 Valid: 45,536 Spoilt: 332 Quota: 11,385 Turnout: 61.1%

=== 2020 general election ===
2020 general election: Limerick County
Party	Candidate	FPv%	Count					
Party	Candidate	FPv%	1	2	3	4	5	6
Fine Gael	Patrick O'Donovan	20.0	9,228	9,458	9,952	10,893	15,552	
Fianna Fáil	Niall Collins	18.4	8,436	8,631	8,885	11,870		
Sinn Féin	Séighin Ó Ceallaigh	15.0	6,916	7,204	7,814	8,125	8,579	8,955
Independent	Richard O'Donoghue	13.1	6,021	6,599	7,050	7,647	8,587	10,320
Fine Gael	Tom Neville	12.6	5,810	5,970	6,358	6,765		
Fianna Fáil	Michael Collins	11.2	5,150	5,320	5,532			
Green	Claire Keating	5.4	2,503	2,688				
Aontú	Conor O'Donoghue	1.5	714					
Independent	Robert O'Donnell	0.9	402					
Independent	Con Cremin	0.8	373					
Renua	John Dalton	0.7	313					
National Party	Cristín Ní Mhaoldhomhnaigh	0.5	224					
Electorate: 72,165 Valid: 46,090 Spoilt: 409 Quota: 11,523 Turnout: 46,499 (64.4%)

=== 2016 general election ===
2016 general election: Limerick County
Party	Candidate	FPv%	Count					
Party	Candidate	FPv%	1	2	3	4	5	6
Fianna Fáil	Niall Collins	27.6	12,276					
Fine Gael	Patrick O'Donovan	19.1	8,479	8,637	8,712	9,183	9,498	10,291
Fine Gael	Tom Neville	18.0	8,013	8,214	8,291	8,874	9,217	10,369
Independent	Emmett O'Brien	12.2	5,432	5,737	5,879	6,676	7,569	9,481
Sinn Féin	Seamus Browne	7.5	3,347	3,465	3,550	3,783		
Social Democrats	James Heffernan	7.4	3,270	3,463	3,698	4,319	5,662	
Independent	Richard O'Donoghue	6.4	2,855	3,021	3,118			
Green	Alexander Storey Cosgrave	0.7	311	321				
Direct Democracy	Mark Keogh	0.5	222	231				
Independent	John O'Gorman	0.5	207	219				
Electorate: 67,633 Valid: 44,412 Spoilt: 336 Quota: 11,104 Turnout: 44,748 (66.16%)

== See also ==
- Elections in the Republic of Ireland
- Politics of the Republic of Ireland
- List of Dáil by-elections
- List of political parties in the Republic of Ireland
