= Civic Offices, Limerick =

Municipal building in County Limerick, Ireland

Coordinates: 52.6389°N 8.6454°W

The Civic Offices is a municipal facility in Dooradoyle, Limerick, County Limerick, Ireland.

== History ==
Previously Limerick County Council held its meetings at County Buildings in O'Connell Street. The county council moved a new facility, which was designed by Bucholz McEvoy, in 2003. The building was awarded first place in the Annual Business Week / Architectural Record Awards in 2004. Originally known as "County Hall", the building was renamed the "Civic Offices" following the merger of Limerick City Council and Limerick County Council to create Limerick City and County Council in 2014.
