= James Heffernan (Irish politician) =

Irish former politician (born 1979)

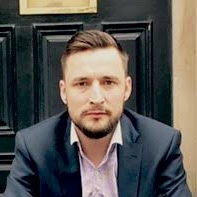
- Heffernan in 2015

Senator
- In office 25 May 2011 – 8 June 2016
- Constituency: Agricultural Panel

Personal details
- Born: 3 October 1979 (age 46) Limerick, Ireland
- Party: Social Democrats (2015–2016)
- Other political affiliations: Independent (2012–2015); Labour Party (2007–2012)
- Education: University of Limerick
- Profession: Former teacher

James Heffernan (born 3 October 1979) is an Irish former Labour Party politician.

== Background ==
He is from a Limerick hurling family, with his father and brother, both called Pat, having played for the county. Heffernan was heavily involved with Labour Youth during his time in university, serving on the organisation's internal disciplinary committee.

== Career ==
=== Primary-school teacher ===
A graduate of the University of Limerick, Heffernan was a primary school teacher by profession. Before becoming a full-time politician in around 2009, Heffernan taught in a number of schools, including St Anne's in Whitechapel, London.

=== Labour politician ===
He was a candidate at 2007 general election for the Limerick West constituency. He was a member of Limerick County Council from 2009 to 2011 for the Kilmallock local electoral area. He was a candidate at the 2011 general election for the Limerick constituency, polling 7,910 first preference votes (17.5%). He was elected to the 24th Seanad in April 2011 on the Agricultural Panel for the Labour Party.

He lost the parliamentary Labour Party whip in December 2012 after voting against the government on the Social Welfare Bill. The loss of the whip resulted in a falloff in Heffernan's Seanad voting attendance. In September 2013, it was reported that Heffernan attended only 23% of all votes in the Seanad, the second worst record.

=== Social Democrats ===
In February 2015, he claimed he was forming a new political party in order to oppose Sinn Féin. On 4 September 2015, the Social Democrats announced that Heffernan was one of their five election candidates.

== Anti-social behaviour ==
Between 31 July 31 and 2 August 2016, Heffernan was allegedly arrested 3 times for offences including spitting at Gardaí, and drunken behaviour while attending Indiependence Music & Arts Festival in Mitchelstown, County Cork. In January 2019, he was found guilty of assaulting three Gardaí after he was arrested outside Indiependence in August 2016.

In April 2019, Heffernan was imprisoned for three months for the assault.

In 2020 he was accused of stealing a book on parliamentary debates, as well as a coat, from the Stephens Green Club.

In May 2023 he was given a four month sentence, suspended for 18 months, for various public order offences. He had been arrested 3 times in Dublin in the 24 hours after he attempted to hand in nomination papers at Trinity College for the 2022 Dublin University by-election but they were rejected. In court it emerged he had 33 prior convictions including 14 under the Public Order Act, three assaults, thefts including burglary, and road traffic offences.

== See also ==
- List of members of the Oireachtas imprisoned since 1923
