= 2004 Waterford City Council election =

Part of the 2004 Irish local elections

- 11 June 2004

All 15 seats on Waterford City Council
	First party	Second party	Third party
Party	Fine Gael	Labour	Sinn Féin
Seats won	4	3	2
Seat change	+1	+1	+2
	Fourth party	Fifth party	Sixth party
Party	Workers' Party	Fianna Fáil	Independent
Seats won	2	1	3
Seat change	-1	-3	+1
	Seventh party
Party	Progressive Democrats
Seats won	0
Seat change	-1
- Map showing the area of Waterford City Council
Council control after election
TBD

An election to Waterford City Council took place on 11 June 2004 as part of that year's Irish local elections. 15 councillors were elected from three local electoral areas (LEAs) for a five-year term of office on the electoral system of proportional representation by means of the single transferable vote (PR-STV).

== Results by party ==
Party	Seats	±	First Pref. votes	FPv%	±%
Fine Gael	4	+1	3,235	18.52	
Labour	3	+1	2,660	15.23	
Sinn Féin	2	+2	2,366	13.55	
Workers' Party	2	-1	1,774	10.16	
Fianna Fáil	1	-3	2,435	13.94	
Independent	3	+1	3,702	21.19	
Progressive Democrats	0	-1	516	2.95	
Totals	15	0	17,467	100.00	—

== Results by local electoral area ==
=== Waterford No.1 ===
Waterford No.1 - 4 seats
Party	Candidate	FPv%	Count					
Party	Candidate	FPv%	1	2	3	4	5	6
Fine Gael	Hilary Quinlan*	20.82	923					
Labour	Pat Hayes*	19.69	873	884	896			
Sinn Féin	Joe Kelly	14.89	660	663	674	699	765	817
Workers' Party	Davy Walsh*	11.28	500	504	511	576	640	759
Fianna Fáil	Sean Dower*	9.90	439	442	503	530	589	688
Independent	Pat Power	7.58	336	340	351	387	464	
Independent	Oli Dempsey	7.08	314	316	331	367		
Fine Gael	Dick Hayden	5.64	250	258	264			
Fianna Fáil	Maurice Walsh	3.11	138	139				
Electorate: 7,534 Valid: 4,433 (58.84%) Spoilt: 145 Quota: 887 Turnout: 4,578 (60.76%)

=== Waterford No.2 ===
Waterford No.2 - 5 seats
Party	Candidate	FPv%	Count							
Party	Candidate	FPv%	1	2	3	4	5	6	7	8
Independent	Davy Daniels*	23.10	1,620							
Labour	Jack Walsh	10.49	736	778	810	835	892	1,047	1,218	
Independent	Mary Roche*	9.53	668	752	803	866	976	1,139	1,319	
Fine Gael	Jim D'Arcy	8.61	604	646	673	702	787	869	921	950
Sinn Féin	Frank Walsh	8.51	597	616	629	656	708	764		
Fine Gael	Tom Cunningham*	8.40	589	651	733	782	902	959	1,008	1,033
Green	Brendan McCann	7.53	528	561	590	614	651			
Fine Gael	Jacqueline Kelly	6.72	471	513	549	601				
Fianna Fáil	Stephanie Keating	6.16	432	469	500					
Fianna Fáil	Michael Ivory*	6.02	422	467	518	697	743	774	830	856
Progressive Democrats	Oliver Clery*	4.93	346	391						
Electorate: 11,949 Valid: 7,013 (58.69%) Spoilt: 108 Quota: 1,169 Turnout: 7,121 (59.59%)

=== Waterford No.3 ===
Waterford No.3 - 6 seats
Party	Candidate	FPv%	Count									
Party	Candidate	FPv%	1	2	3	4	5	6	7	8	9	10
Workers' Party	John Halligan*	18.65	1,123									
Sinn Féin	David Cullinane	18.42	1,109									
Labour	Seamus Ryan*	17.46	1,051									
Fianna Fáil	Tom Murphy*	11.97	721	756	788	812	818	864				
Independent	Laurence (Cha) O'Neill*	9.58	577	609	654	709	718	756	788	875		
Fine Gael	Mary O'Halloran*	6.61	398	411	426	454	461	488	499	541	545	617
Fianna Fáil	Chuck O'Connell	4.70	283	294	308	321	323	342	353			
Green	Catherine Kinsella	3.31	199	220	252	274	291	314	381	423	429	508
Independent	Jim Boland	3.11	187	212	248	260	277	280				
Progressive Democrats	Padraig O Griofa	2.82	170	178	185	195	196					
Workers' Party	Billy McCarthy*	2.51	151	255	293	312	327	340	388	420	424	
Socialist Workers	Roy Hassey	0.86	52	65	94	101						
Electorate: 10,649 Valid: 6,021 (56.54%) Spoilt: 139 Quota: 861 Turnout: 6,160 (57.85%)
