= Tom Neville (politician) =

Irish former politician (born 1975)

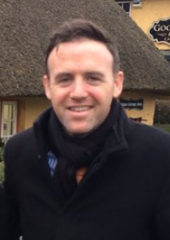
- Neville in 2016

Teachta Dála
- In office February 2016 – February 2020
- Constituency: Limerick County

Limerick County Councillor
- In office May 2014 – February 2016
- Constituency: Adare–Rathkeale
- In office October 2003 – June 2009
- Constituency: Rathkeale

Personal details
- Born: 25 September 1975 (age 50) Limerick, Ireland
- Party: Fine Gael
- Spouse: Jenny Dixon (m. 2019)
- Parent: Dan Neville (father)
- Education: University of Limerick

Tom Neville (born 25 September 1975) is an Irish former Fine Gael politician who served as a Teachta Dála (TD) for the Limerick County constituency from 2016 to 2020.

He had been a member of Limerick County Council from 2003 to 2009 and from 2014 to 2016. His father is the former Fine Gael TD Dan Neville. He was co-opted onto Limerick County Council in 2003 in place of his father.

He lost his seat at the 2020 general election. He unsuccessfully contested the 2020 Seanad election.

Neville is also an actor and stand-up comedian.

Dáil	Election	Deputy (Party)	Deputy (Party)	Deputy (Party)
32nd	2016	Niall Collins (FF)	Patrick O'Donovan (FG)	Tom Neville (FG)
33rd	2020	Niall Collins (FF)	Patrick O'Donovan (FG)	Richard O'Donoghue (Ind.)
34th	2024	Niall Collins (FF)	Patrick O'Donovan (FG)	Richard O'Donoghue (II)
