= Patrick O'Donovan =

Irish politician (born 1977)

Patrick O'Donovan TD
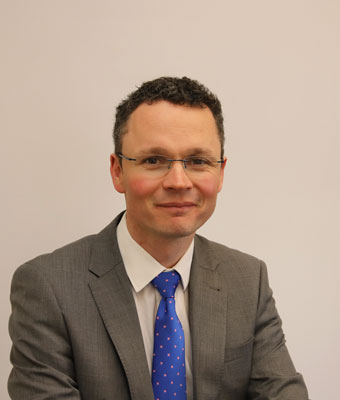
- O'Donovan in 2020

Minister without Portfolio
- Incumbent
- Assumed office 2 November 2026
- Taoiseach: Micheál Martin

Minister for Culture, Communications and Sport
- In office 23 January 2025 – 2 November 2026 (Note: Temporary reassignment.)
- Taoiseach: Micheál Martin
- Preceded by: Catherine Martin
- Succeeded by: Peter Burke

Minister for Further and Higher Education, Research, Innovation and Science
- In office 9 April 2024 – 23 January 2025
- Taoiseach: Simon Harris
- Preceded by: Simon Harris
- Succeeded by: James Lawless

Minister of State
- 2022–2024: Tourism, Culture, Arts, Gaeltacht, Sport and Media
- 2017–2024: Public Expenditure, NDP Delivery and Reform
- 2017–2020: Finance
- 2016–2017: Transport, Tourism and Sport

Teachta Dála
- Incumbent
- Assumed office February 2016
- Constituency: Limerick County
- In office February 2011 – February 2016
- Constituency: Limerick

Personal details
- Born: 21 March 1977 (age 49) Limerick, Ireland
- Party: Fine Gael
- Spouse: Eileen Keary (m. 2014)
- Children: 3
- Education: University College Cork; Mary Immaculate College
- Website: patrickodonovan.ie

Patrick O'Donovan (born 21 March 1977) is an Irish Fine Gael politician who has served as government minister since 2024. He served as Minister for Further and Higher Education, Research, Innovation and Science from 2024 to 2025 and as Minister for Culture, Communications and Sport from January 2025 until a temporary reassignment in November 2026. He remains in government as a Minister without Portfolio. He was a Minister of State from 2016 to 2024. He has been a Teachta Dála (TD) for Limerick County since 2016, and was a TD for Limerick from 2011 to 2016.

== Personal life ==
He was born and raised in Newcastle West, County Limerick. He has a degree in chemistry from University College Cork. After working as an analytical chemist and industry consultant, he returned to college obtaining a Graduate Diploma in Education from Mary Immaculate College, Limerick. He later worked as a primary school teacher. In 2014, he married Eileen Keary; and they have three children.

In early 2026, O'Donovan publicly spoke about being diagnosed with epilepsy and his identity as a disabled person.

== Early career ==
He was a member of Limerick County Council for the Newcastle West local electoral area from 2003 to 2011.

In January 2014, he called for "tougher controls on the use of open source internet browsers and payment systems" which he claimed allowed users to remain anonymous in the illegal trade of drugs, weapons and pornography.

== In government ==
=== Minister of State ===
On 19 May 2016, following the 2016 general election and the formation of minority Fine Gael government led by Enda Kenny, O'Donovan was appointed as Minister of State at the Department of Transport, Tourism and Sport with responsibility for Tourism and Sport.

On 20 June 2017, following the appointment of Leo Varadkar as Taoiseach, he was appointed by the new government as Minister of State at the Department of Public Expenditure and Reform and at the Department of Finance with responsibility for Public Procurement, Open Government and eGovernment. In August 2017, he claimed in an interview with the Sunday Independent, that the Provisional IRA were responsible for the Dublin and Monaghan bombings. Fine Gael declined to comment on the matter.

On 1 July 2020, he was appointed by the new government formed after the 2020 general election led by Micheál Martin as Minister of State at the Department of Public Expenditure and Reform, with responsibility for the Office of Public Works.

In December 2022, following the appointment of Leo Varadkar as taoiseach, he was re-appointed to the same post, as well as the post of Minister of State at the Department of Tourism, Culture, Arts, Gaeltacht, Sport and Media with special responsibility for the Gaeltacht. On 29 June 2023 he was hospitalised after collapsing in the chamber of Dáil Éireann. Ten weeks later he had recovered sufficiently to resume his post. He later ascribed the incident to undiagnosed photosensitive epilepsy.

=== Minister for Further and Higher Education, Research, Innovation and Science ===
On 9 April 2024, O'Donovan was appointed as Minister for Further and Higher Education, Research, Innovation and Science following the appointment of Simon Harris as Taoiseach.

He was appointed by Fine Gael as director of elections for Daniel Butler in the 2024 Limerick mayoral election.

=== Minister for Culture, Communications and Sport ===
==== 2025 ====
On 23 January 2025, O'Donovan was appointed as Minister for Culture, Communications and Sport in the government led by Micheál Martin, following the 2024 general election.

In December 2025, O'Donovan proposed new measures requiring social media users to verify their age with a government smartphone app before accessing platforms such as Facebook and Instagram in order to protect children from pornographic material and other adult content online. These proposals were met with strong criticism from civil liberty and digital privacy campaigners, as well as legal and digital experts. Critics described the plans as disproportionate, intrusive and potentially illegal, however O'Donovan responded by emphasising the importance of child protection.

On 19 December 2025, O'Donovan accused one of his predecessors, Shane Ross, of setting back the role of women in Irish sport by "about 20 years".

==== 2026 ====
On 4 January, O'Donovan and Simon Harris announced the introduction of a new tax credit for “unscripted programmes”, which would include the likes of game shows and reality TV.

On 8 January 2026, O'Donovan faced criticism from fellow TDs and the Dublin Rape Crisis Centre after claiming that X (formerly Twitter) was not responsible for non-consensual sexual images and child sexual abuse images created by the platform's AI tool, Grok, at the request of users. He had instead argued that the users requesting the creation of the images were solely responsible. The following day, O'Donovan announced that he had deactivated his X account due to his concerns about the use of Grok to generate said material.On 13 January, he claimed that his comments about X and Grok had been “taken out of context”. On 16 January, during an interview on RTÉ Radio 1, O'Donovan rejected claims that the government had not been taking the issue seriously, describing the accusation as "rubbish".

In March 2026, an investigation carried out by the OCCRP and its partners found that Aughinish Alumina, a Russian-owned alumina refinery in Limerick, indirectly supplies materials to sanctioned Russian arms manufacturers. This contradicted statements made by O'Donovan during a Dáil debate in April 2022 that the refinery is "not in any way connected to a war machine", and "not connected, as some people might want to suggest, to any sort of Russian empire”.

On 13 April, O'Donovan said that he would be asking Coimisiún na Meán to review whether media coverage of recent fuel protests had been balanced; this was strongly criticised by the National Union of Journalists, who described the comments as "sinister and deeply disturbing". During a debate in the Dáil the following day, Labour Party leader Ivana Bacik also criticised him when she compared him to the outgoing Hungarian prime minister Viktor Orban. O'Donovan later repudiated the comparison, saying that "If I was ... a woman, I don’t think she’d have said it." He was also strongly criticised by other TDs, including members of Fine Gael, while Tánaiste and Fine Gael leader Simon Harris distanced himself from O'Donovan's comments. Following a meeting with officials from Coimisiún na Meán on 14 April, a spokesperson for O'Donovan said that the Minister was no longer seeking a media coverage review despite his comments the day before. On 17 April, O'Donovan admitted that he had "made a hames" of what he was trying to say when calling for a review of media coverage of the fuel protests, but defended his record as minister, and said he planned to propose a new bill related to media independence in the future.

== Notes ==
Political offices
Preceded by Michael Ring	Minister of State at the Department of Transport, Tourism and Sport; 2016–2017	Succeeded by Brendan Griffin
Preceded by Eoghan Murphy	Minister of State at the Department of Finance; 2017–2020	Succeeded by Jack Chambers
Preceded by Eoghan Murphy	Minister of State at the Department of Public Expenditure, National Development Plan Delivery and Reform; 2017–2024	Succeeded by Kieran O'Donnell
Preceded by Jack Chambers	Minister of State at the Department of Tourism, Culture, Arts, Gaeltacht, Sport and Media; 2022–2024	Succeeded by Thomas Byrne
Preceded by Simon Harris	Minister for Further and Higher Education, Research, Innovation and Science; 2024–2025	Succeeded by James Lawless
Preceded by Catherine Martin as Minister for Tourism, Culture, Arts, Gaeltacht, Sport and Media	Minister for Culture, Communications and Sport; 2025–2026	Succeeded by Peter Burke

Dáil	Election	Deputy (Party)	Deputy (Party)	Deputy (Party)	Deputy (Party)	Deputy (Party)	Deputy (Party)	Deputy (Party)
4th	1923	Richard Hayes (CnaG)	James Ledden (CnaG)	Seán Carroll (Rep)	James Colbert (Rep)	John Nolan (CnaG)	Patrick Clancy (Lab)	Patrick Hogan (FP)
4th	1924 by-election	Richard O'Connell (CnaG)	James Ledden (CnaG)	Seán Carroll (Rep)	James Colbert (Rep)	John Nolan (CnaG)	Patrick Clancy (Lab)	Patrick Hogan (FP)
5th	1927 (Jun)	Richard O'Connell (CnaG)	Gilbert Hewson (Ind.)	Tadhg Crowley (FF)	James Colbert (FF)	George C. Bennett (CnaG)	Patrick Clancy (Lab)	Michael Keyes (Lab)
6th	1927 (Sep)	Richard O'Connell (CnaG)	Daniel Bourke (FF)	Tadhg Crowley (FF)	James Colbert (FF)	George C. Bennett (CnaG)	Patrick Clancy (Lab)	John Nolan (CnaG)
7th	1932	James Reidy (CnaG)	Daniel Bourke (FF)	Tadhg Crowley (FF)	James Colbert (FF)	George C. Bennett (CnaG)	Robert Ryan (FF)	John O'Shaughnessy (FP)
8th	1933	James Reidy (CnaG)	Daniel Bourke (FF)	Tadhg Crowley (FF)	Donnchadh Ó Briain (FF)	George C. Bennett (CnaG)	Robert Ryan (FF)	Michael Keyes (Lab)
9th	1937	John O'Shaughnessy (FG)	Daniel Bourke (FF)	Michael Colbert (FF)	Donnchadh Ó Briain (FF)	George C. Bennett (FG)	Robert Ryan (FF)	Michael Keyes (Lab)
10th	1938	James Reidy (FG)	Daniel Bourke (FF)	Tadhg Crowley (FF)	Donnchadh Ó Briain (FF)	George C. Bennett (FG)	Robert Ryan (FF)	Michael Keyes (Lab)
11th	1943	James Reidy (FG)	Daniel Bourke (FF)	Tadhg Crowley (FF)	Donnchadh Ó Briain (FF)	George C. Bennett (FG)	Robert Ryan (FF)	Michael Keyes (Lab)
12th	1944	James Reidy (FG)	Daniel Bourke (FF)	Michael Colbert (FF)	Donnchadh Ó Briain (FF)	George C. Bennett (FG)	Robert Ryan (FF)	Michael Keyes (Lab)
13th	1948	Constituency abolished. See Limerick East and Limerick West						

Dáil	Election	Deputy (Party)	Deputy (Party)	Deputy (Party)
31st	2011	Niall Collins (FF)	Dan Neville (FG)	Patrick O'Donovan (FG)
32nd	2016	Constituency abolished. See Limerick County		

Dáil	Election	Deputy (Party)	Deputy (Party)	Deputy (Party)
32nd	2016	Niall Collins (FF)	Patrick O'Donovan (FG)	Tom Neville (FG)
33rd	2020	Niall Collins (FF)	Patrick O'Donovan (FG)	Richard O'Donoghue (Ind.)
34th	2024	Niall Collins (FF)	Patrick O'Donovan (FG)	Richard O'Donoghue (II)
