= Michael Brennan (Progressive Democrats politician) =

Irish politician (born 1946)

Senator
- In office 12 September 2002 – 13 September 2007
- Constituency: Nominated by the Taoiseach

Personal details
- Born: 24 September 1946 (age 79) County Limerick, Ireland
- Party: Progressive Democrats; Fianna Fáil
- Spouse: Rose Houlihan

Michael Brennan (born 24 September 1946) is an Irish former politician from Adare in County Limerick who served as a member of Seanad Éireann.

Brennan was a Fianna Fáil member of Limerick County Council for over 20 years, and served as chairman of the council in 2000. He contested the 1997 general election as an independent candidate having failed to get a Fianna Fáil nomination to run for the party. He later rejoined Fianna Fáil and was nominated by the Taoiseach to Seanad Éireann in 2002, but left the party again on 29 April 2004 to join the Progressive Democrats (PD), after a dispute arising from the end of the dual mandate.

Under the Local Government Act 2001, members of the Oireachtas could no longer serve as local councillors, and Brennan's wife Rose sought a Fianna Fáil nomination to stand for election as his successor in the Bruff Electoral Area. She did not win a nomination, and speculation that she would be imposed as a candidate by the national party did not happen. Rose Brennan also joined the Progressive Democrats, and was elected as a PD county councillor for Bruff. She subsequently became deputy Cathaoirleach of Limerick County Council, and in the 2009 local elections she was elected as a Fine Gael member of the council for the Adare area.

At the 2007 general election Brennan stood as a candidate for the Progressive Democrats in the Limerick West constituency. He polled 1,935 first preferences, 4.79% of the vote on a quota of 10,108 and did not win a seat. Brennan was not returned to the Seanad in the 2007 election.
