= Mary Jackman =

Irish politician (1943–2022)

Senator
- In office 17 September 1997 – 12 September 2002
- In office 1 November 1989 – 17 February 1993
- Constituency: Labour Panel

Personal details
- Born: Mary Furlong; 30 April 1943 Cappawhite, County Tipperary, Ireland
- Died: 30 May 2022 (aged 79) Castletroy, Limerick, Ireland
- Party: Fine Gael
- Spouse: Nicholas Jackman
- Children: 1
- Education: University College Cork

Mary Jackman (née Furlong; 30 April 1943 – 30 May 2022) was an Irish Fine Gael councillor, senator, and secondary school teacher.

She was a senator from 1989 to 1992 and again from 1997 to 2002 and elected chair of Limerick County Council in 1999.

== Biography ==
Born in Cappawhite, County Tipperary, Jackman lived in Castletroy in County Limerick for most of her life.

She studied Geography and English at University College Cork. She captained the university camogie team which won the Ashbourne Cup in 1965.

She then trained as a teacher, and she had spent her entire teaching career at Presentation College in Limerick's inner city from 1965.

A member of Limerick County Council for the Castleconnell local electoral area from 1985 to 2014, she was the first woman Cathaoirleach (chair) of Limerick County Council. Her grandfather, Patrick Duggan, had served on Limerick's first county council.

Jackman was the first public representative from Limerick County Council to win a seat in Irish Seanad.

Jackman had unsuccessfully contested four general elections in the Limerick East constituency (1989, 1992, 1997, and 2002), falling just 305 votes short of winning seat at the 1997 general election. She was also defeated at the Limerick East by-election in March 1998, and did not stand at the 2007 general election.

After her 1989 defeat, she was elected to the 19th Seanad on the Labour Panel. She lost her seat at the 1993 Seanad elections, at which point she returned to teaching in Limerick.

She was then re-elected in 1997 to the 21st Seanad. In 1999, she was the first woman to become Cathaoirleach (chair) of Limerick County Council

At the 2002 Seanad elections, she stood instead on the Industrial and Commercial Panel, but did not win a seat.

She served on the governing bodies of the University of Limerick and the Limerick Institute of Technology, chaired the Limerick Vocational Education Committee, and co-designed the Leaving Certificate Applied Geography syllabus.

She was married to Nicholas Jackman and had one daughter. Jackman died in Limerick on 30 May 2022, aged 79.
