= Limerick County Council =

Former local authority for County Limerick in Ireland (1899–2014)

Limerick County Council Comhairle Contae Luimnigh
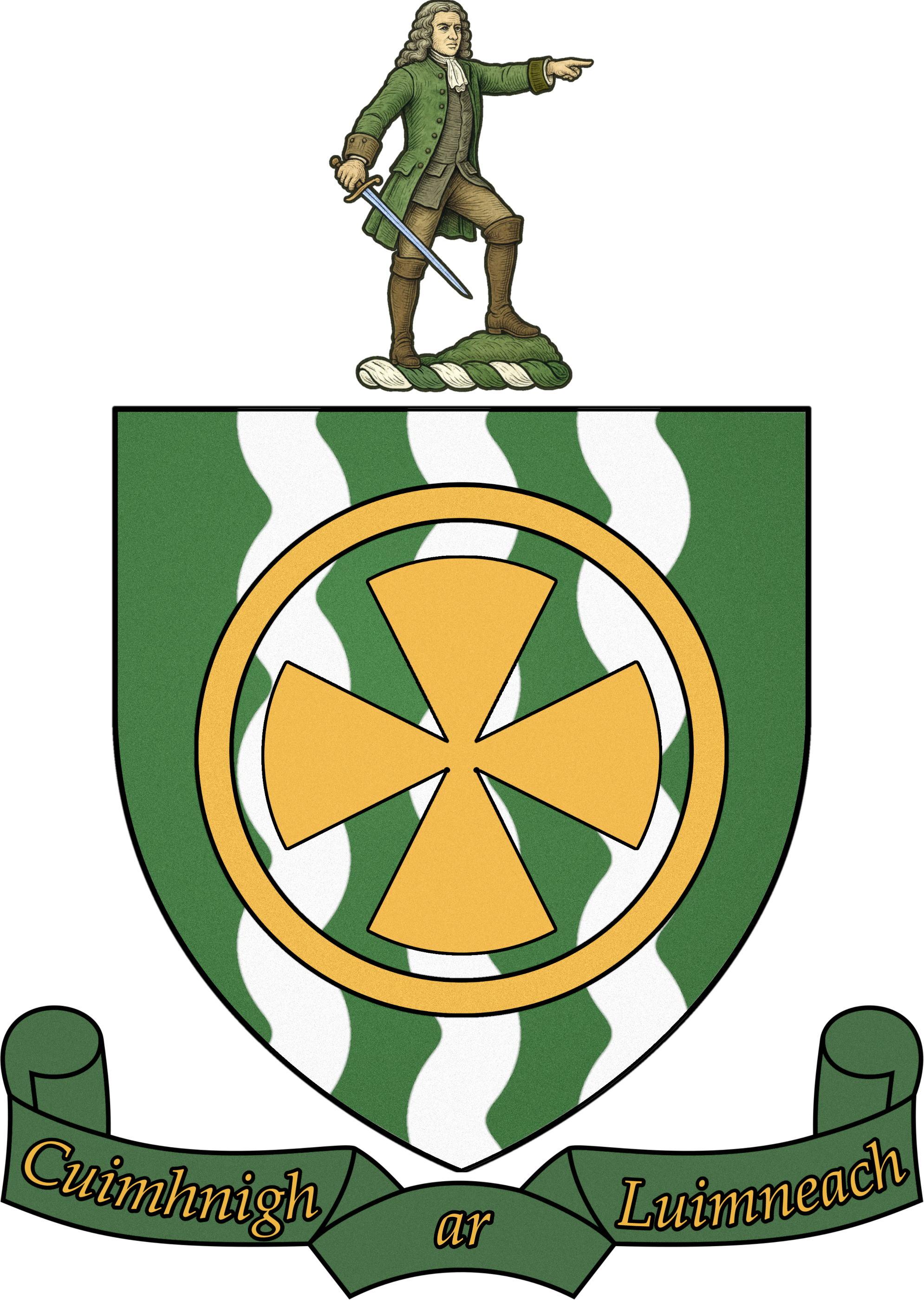

Type
- Type: County council of County Limerick

History
- Established: 1 April 1899
- Disbanded: 1 June 2014
- Succeeded by: Limerick City and County Council
- Seats: 28

Elections
- Last election: 5 June 2009

Motto
- Irish: Cuimhnigh ar Luimneach, lit. 'Remember Limerick'

Meeting place
- County Hall, Dooradoyle, Limerick

The area governed by the council

Limerick County Council (Irish: Comhairle Contae Luimnigh) was the local authority of County Limerick, Ireland, from 1899 to 2014. As a county council, it was governed by the Local Government Act 2001. The head of the council had the title of Cathaoirleach (chairperson).

== History ==
Limerick County Council was established on 1 April 1899 under the Local Government (Ireland) Act 1898 for the administrative county of County Limerick, succeeding the former judicial county of Limerick.

The county council was originally based at Limerick Courthouse and then moved to County Buildings in O'Connell Street in two stages; Nos. 82 and 83 were acquired in 1911 and Nos. 80 and 81 in 1966. The county council then moved to County Hall, Dooradoyle in 2003. Limerick County Council was also responsible for a large proportion of Limerick city's suburbs. The remaining areas of Limerick city were under the authority of Limerick City Council which was a separate authority.

On 28 June 2011, the Minister for the Environment, Community and Local Government Phil Hogan announced that Limerick City Council and Limerick County Council would be merged into a single local authority. The merger would come into effect following the 2014 local elections, at which there was a single 2014 Limerick City and County Council election. The first steps in this merger was the appointment of Conn Murray as the dual manager of both Limerick City Council and Limerick County Council.

It was abolished in 2014 when the Local Government Reform Act 2014 was implemented. The new authority, Limerick City and County Council, came into being on 1 June 2014.

== Elections ==
The Local Government (Ireland) Act 1919 introduced the electoral system of proportional representation by means of the single transferable vote (PR-STV) for the 1920 Irish local elections.

| Year | FG | FF | Lab | PDs | Ind | Total |
| 2009 | 15 | 9 | 2 | — | 2 | 28 |
| 2004 | 12 | 12 | 1 | 3 | 0 | 28 |
| 1999 | 10 | 14 | 0 | 3 | 1 | 28 |
| 1991 | 10 | 13 | 1 | 4 | 0 | 28 |
| 1985 | 10 | 18 | 0 | — | 0 | 28 |
