= 2024 Limerick City and County Council election =

Part of the 2024 Irish local elections

| ← 2019 | 7 June 2024 | 2029 → |

All 40 seats on Limerick City and County Council 21 seats needed for a majority
| | First party | Second party | Third party |
|---|---|---|---|
| Party | Fine Gael | Fianna Fáil | Sinn Féin |
| Seats won | 13 | 10 | 3 |
| Seat change | ▼1 | ▼2 | ▲1 |
| | Fourth party | Fifth party | Sixth party |
| Party | Labour | Independent Ireland | Social Democrats |
| Seats won | 3 | 2 | 2 |
| Seat change | Steady | New | ▲1 |
| | Seventh party | Eighth party | Ninth party |
| Party | Green | Aontú | Independents |
| Seats won | 1 | 1 | 5 |
| Seat change | ▼1 | ▲1 | ▼1 |
- Area of Limerick City and County Council

Elections to all 40 seats on Limerick City and County Council and to the directly elected mayor of Limerick were held in June 2024 as part of the 2024 Irish local elections. Limerick City and County is divided into 6 local electoral areas (LEAs) to elect 40 councillors for a five-year term of office on the electoral system of proportional representation by means of the single transferable vote (PR-STV). Limerick is the first local authority in Ireland to have directly elected mayor, following a plebiscite held at the previous council election.

== Mayoral election ==
An election for a directly elected Mayor of Limerick was held under the Local Government (Mayor of Limerick) and Miscellaneous Provisions Act 2024. Candidates can be nominated by a registered political party or with the support of 60 electors.

2024 Mayor of Limerick
| Party | Candidate | FPv% | Count | | | | | | | | | | | |
| Party | Candidate | FPv% | 1 | 2 | 3 | 4 | 5 | 6 | 7 | 8 | 9 | 10 | 11 | 12 |
|---|---|---|---|---|---|---|---|---|---|---|---|---|---|---|
| Independent | John Moran | 22.96 | 18,308 | 18,363 | 18,397 | 18,462 | 18,618 | 19,080 | 19,350 | 19,719 | 20,982 | 22,290 | 24,958 | 28,451 |
| Independent | Helen O'Donnell | 16.18 | 12,903 | 12,991 | 13,016 | 13,061 | 13,275 | 13,588 | 13,938 | 14,288 | 15,389 | 16,688 | 19,353 | 23,829 |
| Fianna Fáil | Dee Ryan | 14.78 | 11,785 | 11,843 | 11,864 | 11,939 | 12,081 | 12,370 | 12,540 | 12,937 | 13,965 | 15,473 | 18,875 | |
| Fine Gael | Daniel Butler | 12.78 | 10,190 | 10,249 | 10,274 | 10,316 | 10,420 | 10,731 | 10,962 | 11,337 | 12,385 | 13,632 | | |
| Sinn Féin | Maurice Quinlivan | 10.45 | 8,331 | 8,356 | 8,438 | 8,509 | 8,693 | 8,845 | 9,156 | 9,528 | 11,571 | | | |
| Independent | Frankie Daly | 5.74 | 4,574 | 4,597 | 4,645 | 4,686 | 4,815 | 4,907 | 5,410 | 5,689 | | | | |
| Aontú | Sarah Beasley | 3.30 | 2,635 | 2,662 | 2,698 | 2,738 | 2,811 | 2,859 | | | | | | |
| Labour | Conor Sheehan | 3.00 | 2,390 | 2,404 | 2,439 | 2,480 | 2,614 | 2,946 | 3,047 | | | | | |
| Social Democrats | Elisa O'Donovan | 2.99 | 2,384 | 2,401 | 2,478 | 2,526 | 3,061 | 3,336 | 3,439 | 3,799 | | | | |
| Green | Brian Leddin | 2.89 | 2,303 | 2,313 | 2,368 | 2,409 | 2,578 | | | | | | | |
| Rabharta | Laura Keyes | 1.35 | 1,079 | 1,089 | 1,122 | 1,165 | | | | | | | | |
| Independent | Caitríona Ní Chatháin | 1.11 | 886 | 896 | 990 | 1,016 | | | | | | | | |
| Party for Animal Welfare | Gerben Uunk | 0.95 | 758 | 768 | 788 | | | | | | | | | |
| People Before Profit | Ruairi Fahy | 0.86 | 689 | 692 | | | | | | | | | | |
| Independent | Colm Ó Móráin | 0.66 | 530 | | | | | | | | | | | |
Valid: 79,745 Spoilt: 1,923 Quota: 39,873 Turnout: 81,668

== Results by party in the Local elections ==
| Party | Candidates | Seats | ± | First Pref. votes | FPv% | ±% |
|---|---|---|---|---|---|---|
| Fine Gael | 18 | 13 | ▼1 | 24,121 | 29.85 | ▼4.34 |
| Fianna Fáil | 17 | 10 | ▼2 | 18,859 | 23.34 | ▼3.24 |
| Sinn Féin | 11 | 3 | ▲1 | 6,579 | 8.14 | ▲2.16 |
| Labour | 3 | 3 | Steady | 4,319 | 5.35 | ▲1.35 |
| Independent Ireland | 7 | 2 | New | 5,198 | 6.43 | New |
| Social Democrats | 3 | 2 | ▲1 | 1,794 | 2.22 | ▼0.59 |
| Aontú | 3 | 1 | ▲1 | 2,258 | 2.79 | ▼0.11 |
| Green | 4 | 1 | ▼1 | 2,120 | 2.62 | ▼2.32 |
| Rabharta | 2 | 0 | New | 397 | 0.49 | New |
| People Before Profit | 1 | 0 | New | 392 | 0.49 | New |
| Party for Animal Welfare | 1 | 0 | New | 112 | 0.14 | New |
| Independent | 20 | 5 | ▼1 | 14,647 | 18.13 | ▲1.59 |
| Totals | 90 | 40 | Steady | 80,796 | 100.00 | |

== Results by local electoral area ==
*: Outgoing councillor elected in 2019.
†: Outgoing councillor coopted subsequent to the 2019 election.

=== Adare–Rathkeale ===
Adare–Rathkeale: 6 seats
| Party | Candidate | FPv% | Count | | | | | | |
| Party | Candidate | FPv% | 1 | 2 | 3 | 4 | 5 | 6 | 7 |
|---|---|---|---|---|---|---|---|---|---|
| Fine Gael | Stephen Keary | 17.71% | 2,329 | | | | | | |
| Fine Gael | Adam Teskey | 14.46% | 1,902 | | | | | | |
| Fianna Fáil | Bridie Collins | 11.51% | 1,514 | 1,617 | 1,733 | 1,870 | 1,877 | 2,161 | |
| Independent Ireland | John O'Donoghue | 9.75% | 1,282 | 1,342 | 1,446 | 1,487 | 1,491 | 1,785 | 1,830 |
| Independent | Richie Crehan | 9.50% | 1,249 | 1,263 | 1,353 | 1,436 | 1,437 | 1,540 | 1,571 |
| Independent Ireland | Tommy Hartigan | 9.25% | 1,217 | 1,255 | 1,432 | 1,621 | 1,625 | 1,688 | 1,701 |
| Fianna Fáil | Gerald Ward | 8.23% | 1,082 | 1,120 | 1,170 | 1,384 | 1,389 | 1,516 | 1,615 |
| Fianna Fáil | Trina O'Dea | 7.28% | 957 | 987 | 1,033 | 1,073 | 1,075 | | |
| Sinn Féin | Joanne Collins | 6.09% | 801 | 828 | | | | | |
| Fine Gael | Michael Sheahan | 5.95% | 782 | 920 | 961 | | | | |
| Independent | Robert Daly | 0.28% | 37 | 39 | | | | | |
Electorate: 25,573 Valid: 13,152 Spoilt: 150 Quota: 1,879 Turnout: 13,302 (52.02%)

=== Cappamore–Kilmallock ===
Cappamore–Kilmallock: 7 seats
| Party | Candidate | FPv% | Count | | | | | | | | | |
| Party | Candidate | FPv% | 1 | 2 | 3 | 4 | 5 | 6 | 7 | 8 | 9 | 10 |
|---|---|---|---|---|---|---|---|---|---|---|---|---|
| Independent | Brigid Teefy | 16.28% | 2,672 | | | | | | | | | |
| Fianna Fáil | Martin Ryan | 12.54% | 2,059 | | | | | | | | | |
| Independent | Eddie Ryan | 12.25% | 2,011 | 2,085 | | | | | | | | |
| Fine Gael | Noreen Stokes | 8.78% | 1,442 | 1,557 | 1,631 | 1,636 | 1,713 | 1,734 | 1,885 | 2,016 | 2,359 | |
| Fine Gael | Gregory Conway | 8.27% | 1,358 | 1,393 | 1,400 | 1,402 | 1,419 | 1,507 | 1,545 | 1,638 | 1,693 | 1,726 |
| Sinn Féin | P.J. Carey | 7.52% | 1,234 | 1,271 | 1,288 | 1,292 | 1,325 | 1,458 | 1,555 | 1,632 | 1,750 | 1,766 |
| Fine Gael | Tommy O'Sullivan | 7.44% | 1,221 | 1,238 | 1,252 | 1,255 | 1,276 | 1,315 | 1,359 | 1,455 | 1,491 | 1,535 |
| Fianna Fáil | Michael Donegan | 5.64% | 926 | 958 | 1,000 | 1,003 | 1,018 | 1,088 | 1,124 | 1,314 | 1,375 | 1,420 |
| Fianna Fáil | Al Fitzgerald | 4.57% | 751 | 802 | 869 | 870 | 895 | 923 | 963 | | | |
| Aontú | Michael Ryan | 4.10% | 673 | 731 | 789 | 792 | 867 | 943 | 1,036 | 1,107 | | |
| Independent Ireland | Grainne Hanley | 3.66% | 601 | 624 | 631 | 636 | 717 | | | | | |
| Green | Robert O'Donnell | 3.31% | 543 | 588 | 637 | 638 | 736 | 768 | | | | |
| Independent | Michelle Hayes | 3.18% | 522 | 580 | 617 | 622 | | | | | | |
| Fianna Fáil | Denny Hourigan | 2.46% | 404 | 476 | | | | | | | | |
Electorate: 28,184 Valid: 16,417 Spoilt: 167 Quota: 2,053 Turnout: 16,584 (58.84%)

=== Limerick City East ===
Limerick City East: 7 seats
| Party | Candidate | FPv% | Count | | | | | | | | | | |
| Party | Candidate | FPv% | 1 | 2 | 3 | 4 | 5 | 6 | 7 | 8 | 9 | 10 | 11 |
|---|---|---|---|---|---|---|---|---|---|---|---|---|---|
| Fianna Fáil | Catherine Slattery | 14.73% | 1,894 | | | | | | | | | | |
| Fine Gael | Peter Doyle | 13.43% | 1,727 | | | | | | | | | | |
| Fianna Fáil | Joe Pond | 12.36% | 1,589 | 1,654 | | | | | | | | | |
| Labour | Elena Secas | 12.27% | 1,577 | 1,601 | 1,636 | | | | | | | | |
| Fine Gael | Sarah Kiely | 10.91% | 1,403 | 1,491 | 1,523 | 1,534 | 1,557 | 1,578 | 1,582 | 1,614 | | | |
| Green | Sean Hartigan | 5.87% | 755 | 769 | 778 | 783 | 793 | 799 | 805 | 858 | 1,028 | 1,083 | 1,390 |
| Fine Gael | Michael Murphy | 5.74% | 738 | 744 | 766 | 769 | 776 | 783 | 788 | 877 | 905 | 915 | |
| Aontú | Eric Nelligan | 5.69% | 731 | 746 | 754 | 758 | 777 | 805 | 805 | 856 | 889 | 937 | 1,002 |
| Sinn Féin | Ursula Gavan | 3.76% | 483 | 494 | 496 | 498 | 505 | 654 | 654 | 697 | 753 | 1,139 | 1,203 |
| Social Democrats | Donnah S. Vuma | 3.65% | 469 | 477 | 481 | 482 | 503 | 509 | 515 | 546 | | | |
| Independent | Dean Lillis | 3.34% | 429 | 433 | 437 | 437 | 507 | 515 | 515 | | | | |
| Sinn Féin | Danielle O'Shea | 3.20% | 411 | 433 | 434 | 436 | 449 | 557 | 557 | 573 | 688 | | |
| Sinn Féin | Mike Killeen | 2.84% | 365 | 381 | 382 | 382 | 387 | | | | | | |
| Rabharta | Michael O'Brien | 1.00% | 128 | 134 | 135 | 137 | | | | | | | |
| Independent | Patrick McCarthy | 0.80% | 103 | 108 | 108 | 109 | | | | | | | |
| Independent | Tally Slater | 0.42% | 54 | 56 | 56 | 56 | | | | | | | |
Electorate: 27,360 Valid: 12,856 Spoilt: 209 Quota: 1,608 Turnout: 13,065 (47.75%)

=== Limerick City North ===
Limerick City North: 7 seats
| Party | Candidate | FPv% | Count | | | | | | | | | | | | | | |
| Party | Candidate | FPv% | 1 | 2 | 3 | 4 | 5 | 6 | 7 | 8 | 9 | 10 | 11 | 12 | 13 | 14 | 15 |
|---|---|---|---|---|---|---|---|---|---|---|---|---|---|---|---|---|---|
| Independent | Frankie Daly | 12.19% | 1,553 | 1,560 | 1,569 | 1,578 | 1,621 | | | | | | | | | | |
| Labour | Conor Sheehan | 11.90% | 1,516 | 1,522 | 1,556 | 1,585 | 1,604 | | | | | | | | | | |
| Fianna Fáil | Kieran O'Hanlon | 10.33% | 1,316 | 1,319 | 1,331 | 1,346 | 1,351 | 1,352 | 1,353 | 1,373 | 1,389 | 1,505 | 1,545 | 1,626 | | | |
| Fine Gael | Olivia O'Sullivan | 9.10% | 1,160 | 1,164 | 1,210 | 1,236 | 1,260 | 1,261 | 1,263 | 1,353 | 1,364 | 1,474 | 1,485 | 1,782 | | | |
| Aontú | Sarah Beasley | 6.70% | 854 | 859 | 863 | 878 | 915 | 917 | 919 | 932 | 964 | 985 | 1,028 | 1,045 | 1,057 | 1,264 | 1,355 |
| Sinn Féin | Sharon Benson | 5.70% | 727 | 780 | 783 | 788 | 795 | 796 | 796 | 807 | 856 | 877 | 1,224 | 1,240 | 1,247 | 1,388 | 1,439 |
| Independent | Pat O'Neill | 5.30% | 675 | 675 | 676 | 684 | 702 | 705 | 707 | 723 | 735 | 763 | 766 | 808 | 832 | 878 | 1,019 |
| Independent | Dean Quinn | 5.07% | 646 | 651 | 652 | 657 | 666 | 667 | 667 | 678 | 700 | 710 | 726 | 740 | 746 | | |
| Independent | Adam Kearney | 4.52% | 576 | 578 | 589 | 605 | 624 | 630 | 630 | 655 | 673 | 692 | 704 | 754 | 783 | 822 | |
| Social Democrats | Shane Hickey-O'Mara | 4.33% | 552 | 557 | 561 | 595 | 599 | 600 | 601 | 675 | 831 | 879 | 895 | 938 | 969 | 993 | 1,092 |
| Fine Gael | Richard Delaney | 4.28% | 545 | 547 | 575 | 585 | 616 | 622 | 623 | 653 | 657 | 682 | 693 | | | | |
| Sinn Féin | Tom Collopy | 4.22% | 538 | 581 | 582 | 586 | 593 | 594 | 594 | 599 | 635 | 638 | | | | | |
| Fianna Fáil | Suzzie O'Deniyi | 3.18% | 405 | 407 | 411 | 428 | 443 | 445 | 446 | 498 | 511 | | | | | | |
| PBP–Solidarity | Ruairi Fahy | 3.08% | 392 | 400 | 401 | 418 | 426 | 427 | 427 | 463 | | | | | | | |
| Green | Saša Novak Uí Chonchúir | 2.98% | 380 | 382 | 383 | 416 | 423 | 424 | 424 | | | | | | | | |
| Independent Ireland | Ruth Clarke | 2.31% | 294 | 294 | 295 | 304 | | | | | | | | | | | |
| Rabharta | Laura Keyes | 2.11% | 269 | 270 | 271 | | | | | | | | | | | | |
| Fine Gael | Mark Spain | 1.40% | 178 | 178 | | | | | | | | | | | | | |
| Sinn Féin | Tanya Dunworth | 1.32% | 168 | | | | | | | | | | | | | | |
Electorate: 27,239 Valid: 12,744 Spoilt: 178 Quota: 1,594 Turnout: 12,922 (47.44%)

=== Limerick City West ===
Limerick City West: 7 seats
| Party | Candidate | FPv% | Count | | | | | | | | | | | |
| Party | Candidate | FPv% | 1 | 2 | 3 | 4 | 5 | 6 | 7 | 8 | 9 | 10 | 11 | 12 |
|---|---|---|---|---|---|---|---|---|---|---|---|---|---|---|
| Fine Gael | Daniel Butler | 18.38% | 2,233 | | | | | | | | | | | |
| Fine Gael | Dan McSweeney | 14.20% | 1,725 | | | | | | | | | | | |
| Labour | Joe Leddin | 10.09% | 1,226 | 1,360 | 1,374 | 1,389 | 1,405 | 1,415 | 1,428 | 1,538 | | | | |
| Fianna Fáil | Abul Kalam Azad Talukder | 8.70% | 1,057 | 1,079 | 1,083 | 1,135 | 1,138 | 1,144 | 1,147 | 1,178 | 1,183 | 1,196 | 1,197 | 1,278 |
| Fianna Fáil | Fergus Kilcoyne | 6.90% | 838 | 944 | 999 | 1,000 | 1,012 | 1,018 | 1,031 | 1,051 | 1,196 | 1,255 | 1,257 | 1,405 |
| Independent | Maria Donoghue | 6.44% | 783 | 817 | 822 | 828 | 843 | 888 | 898 | 947 | 1,019 | 1,116 | 1,118 | 1,252 |
| Social Democrats | Elisa O'Donovan | 6.36% | 773 | 842 | 852 | 861 | 867 | 873 | 893 | 1,003 | 1,059 | 1,213 | 1,219 | 1,378 |
| Fine Gael | Michael MacCurtain | 5.15% | 626 | 794 | 834 | 837 | 845 | 848 | 853 | 900 | 936 | 969 | 974 | |
| Independent Ireland | Esther Aherne | 4.75% | 577 | 632 | 656 | 659 | 680 | 737 | 759 | 787 | 889 | 979 | 981 | 1,066 |
| Sinn Féin | Malachy McCreesh | 4.26% | 518 | 536 | 542 | 544 | 551 | 563 | 777 | 801 | 847 | | | |
| Independent | Seán Lynch | 4.06% | 493 | 531 | 566 | 567 | 587 | 625 | 632 | 653 | | | | |
| Green | Peter Spencer | 3.64% | 442 | 480 | 485 | 485 | 492 | 500 | 508 | | | | | |
| Sinn Féin | Frances Lonergan | 2.67% | 324 | 336 | 339 | 342 | 347 | 354 | | | | | | |
| Independent | Cathal McCarthy | 2.25% | 273 | 278 | 280 | 285 | 295 | | | | | | | |
| Independent | Alec Morrissey | 1.20% | 146 | 155 | 157 | 159 | | | | | | | | |
| Independent | Shahin Reza | 0.53% | 64 | 66 | 66 | | | | | | | | | |
| Independent | Khalid Mahmood | 0.36% | 44 | 45 | 45 | | | | | | | | | |
| Independent | Michael Rafferty | 0.13% | 16 | 18 | 18 | | | | | | | | | |
Electorate: 25,596 Valid: 12,152 Spoilt: 207 Quota: 1,520 Turnout: 12,359 (48.28%)

=== Newcastle West ===
Newcastle West: 6 seats
| Party | Candidate | FPv% | Count | | | | | | | |
| Party | Candidate | FPv% | 1 | 2 | 3 | 4 | 5 | 6 | 7 | 8 |
|---|---|---|---|---|---|---|---|---|---|---|
| Independent | Jerome Scanlon | 16.93% | 2,301 | | | | | | | |
| Fine Gael | Liam Galvin | 16.60% | 2,257 | | | | | | | |
| Fianna Fáil | Michael Collins | 14.80% | 2,012 | | | | | | | |
| Fine Gael | John Sheahan | 9.52% | 1,294 | 1,317 | 1,394 | 1,500 | 1,506 | 1,651 | 1,684 | 1,751 |
| Fine Gael | Tom Ruddle | 8.83% | 1,201 | 1,333 | 1,359 | 1,384 | 1,407 | 1,489 | 1,659 | 1,836 |
| Fianna Fáil | Francis Foley | 8.15% | 1,108 | 1,146 | 1,279 | 1,387 | 1,414 | 1,495 | 1,621 | 1,756 |
| Sinn Féin | Pádraig Collins | 7.43% | 1,010 | 1,040 | 1,080 | 1,116 | 1,124 | 1,175 | 1,282 | 1,455 |
| Independent Ireland | James Barrett | 4.92% | 669 | 730 | 747 | 777 | 785 | 949 | 1,013 | |
| Fianna Fáil | Gerard Madigan | 4.60% | 626 | 680 | 687 | 713 | 723 | 734 | | |
| Independent Ireland | Pat King | 4.10% | 558 | 577 | 590 | 633 | 638 | | | |
| Fianna Fáil | Kathleen Barrett | 2.36% | 321 | 330 | 346 | | | | | |
| Party for Animal Welfare | Gerben Uunk | 0.82% | 112 | 122 | 125 | | | | | |
Electorate: 23,720 Valid: 13,595 Spoilt: 126 Quota: 1,925 Turnout: 13,721 (57.85%)
