= Local government in the Republic of Ireland =

- Counties and cities (since 2014) coloured by Regional Assembly (since 2015)
- Category: Unitary state
- Location: Ireland
- Number: 26 County Councils; 3 City Councils; 2 City and County Councils
- Populations: 31,972 (County Leitrim) – 592,713 (Dublin city)
- Areas: 54 km^{2} (Galway city) – 7,468 km^{2} (County Cork)
- Government: Council government
- Subdivisions: Municipal district Local electoral area

The functions of local government in the Republic of Ireland are mostly exercised by thirty-one local authorities, termed County, City, or City and County Councils. The principal decision-making body in each of the thirty-one local authorities is composed of the members of the council, elected by universal franchise in local elections every five years from multi-seat local electoral areas using the single transferable vote. Many of the authorities' statutory functions are, however, the responsibility of ministerially appointed career officials termed Chief executives. The competencies of the city and county councils include planning, transport infrastructure, sanitary services, public safety (notably fire services) and the provision of public libraries. Each local authority sends representatives to one of three Regional Assemblies.

Local government in the state is governed by Local Government Acts 1925 to 2024, the principal act of which is the Local Government Act 2001. The Local Government (Ireland) Act 1898 is the founding document of the present system. The Twentieth Amendment of the Constitution of Ireland (1999) provided for constitutional recognition of local government for the first time in Ireland in a new Article 28A. The Local Government Reform Act 2014 changed the structure by the abolition of all town councils and the merger of certain county councils. The reforms came into effect in 2014, to coincide with that year's local elections.

== Historical development ==
=== Pre-independence ===
The county was a unit of judicial and administrative government introduced to Ireland following the Norman invasion. The country was shired in a number of phases with County Wicklow being the last to be shired in 1625. County Tipperary was divided into two judicial counties (or ridings) following the establishment of assize courts in 1838. At various times in the past, other entities at a level below that of the county or county borough have been employed in Ireland for various judicial, administrative and revenue collecting purposes. Some of these, such as the barony and grand jury, no longer fulfil their original purpose while retaining only vestigial legal relevance in the modern state. Others, such as the poor law unions, have been transformed into entities still in use by the modern state, but again, their original functions have been substantially altered.

Sixty years later, a more radical reorganisation of local government took place with the Local Government (Ireland) Act 1898. This Act established a county council for each of thirty-three Irish administrative counties (County Tipperary was divided with North Riding and South Riding) and a county borough corporation in six cities that were separate from their respective counties. Each county was divided into urban and rural districts. Urban districts in the area of five municipal boroughs retained the style and title of a borough with a corporation. In all other places, a district council was established. Smaller towns retained town commissioners within rural districts.

=== Development since 1922 ===
The geographic remit of the Irish Free State, established in December 1922 pursuant to the Anglo-Irish Treaty of 1921, was confined to 26 of the traditional counties of Ireland, which included 27 administrative counties and four county boroughs.

Rural districts were abolished everywhere except County Dublin in 1925, and in County Dublin in 1930.

In 1994 County Dublin and the borough of Dún Laoghaire were abolished with their administrative areas being divided among three new counties: Dún Laoghaire–Rathdown, Fingal and South Dublin. The state was divided into eight Regional Authorities.

The Local Government Act 2001 simplified the local government structure, with the principal tier of local government (county and city councils) covering the entire territory of the state and having general responsibility for all functions of local government except in 80 towns within the territory of county councils, where the lower tier (town councils) existed with more limited functions. The five county boroughs of Dublin, Cork, Galway, Waterford, and Limerick were re-styled city councils, with the same status in law as county councils. The lower-level tiers of borough corporations, urban district councils and town commissioners were reduced to a single tier of town council, with five permitted to retain the title of borough council: the city of Kilkenny and the four towns of Sligo, Drogheda, Clonmel, and Wexford.

The Local Government Reform Act 2014 enacted changes which took effect after the 2014 local elections:

- Town councils and borough councils were abolished.
- All counties outside Dublin were divided into municipal districts, with county councillors also being district councillors.
- Limerick City Council and Limerick County Council were dissolved and succeeded by Limerick City and County Council.
- Waterford City Council and Waterford County Council were dissolved and succeeded by Waterford City and County Council.
- North Tipperary County Council and South Tipperary County Council were dissolved and succeeded by Tipperary County Council.
- Councillors' power to overturn planning decisions was removed.
- A portion of Local services to be funded by the property tax.
- The 8 Regional Authorities were dissolved and their functions transferred to the Regional Assemblies.

The civic and ceremonial status of existing cities, boroughs and larger towns was retained after being merged with counties. Those municipal districts that included existing cities or boroughs merged became either "metropolitan districts" or "borough districts". They continue to have mayors as do those districts containing county towns. In all other councils the equivalent office is known as Chair or Cathaoirleach. Each municipal district was issued with a new statutory charter setting out its powers alongside any historic charters that already existed.

At the 2019 Limerick City and County Council election, voters approved a proposal in a plebiscite on the establishment of a directly elected mayor for Limerick City and County by a vote of 52.4%. Support for directly elected mayors has been almost equally divided when put to a popular vote. While the Limerick plebiscite passed by a small margin, voters in Waterford and Cork both rejected the proposal by equally small margins in 2019. The 2024 Limerick mayoral election took place in June 2024, with John Moran, an independent candidate being inaugurated as the first directly elected mayor in Ireland on 21 June 2024.

== County and city councils ==
Region	Local authority	Population (2022)	Area (km^{2})	Population density	Head office	Title of Chair	Number	Resident per member	Regional Assembly members	Code (Note: Vehicle registration plate code. The code may cover the area of multiple local government areas, as in the case of the 4 areas of Dublin.)
Eastern and Midland	Eastern and Midland	2,529,358								
Eastern and Midland	Dublin City Council	588,233	118	5,002	Dublin	Lord Mayor	63	9,337	7	D
Eastern and Midland	Dún Laoghaire–Rathdown County Council	233,457	127	1,840	Dún Laoghaire	Cathaoirleach	40	5,836	3	D
Eastern and Midland	Fingal County Council	329,218	453	727	Swords	Mayor	40	8,230	3	D
Eastern and Midland	Kildare County Council	246,977	1,694	146	Naas	Cathaoirleach	40	6,174	3	KE
Eastern and Midland	Laois County Council	91,657	1,720	53	Portlaoise	Cathaoirleach	19	4,824	2	LS
Eastern and Midland	Longford County Council	46,634	1,091	43	Longford	Cathaoirleach	18	2,591	2	LD
Eastern and Midland	Louth County Council	139,100	832	167	Dundalk	Cathaoirleach	29	4,797	2	LH
Eastern and Midland	Meath County Council	220,296	2,335	94	Navan	Cathaoirleach	40	5,507	3	MH
Eastern and Midland	Offaly County Council	82,668	1,990	42	Tullamore	Cathaoirleach	19	4,351	2	OY
Eastern and Midland	South Dublin County Council	299,793	223	1,344	Tallaght	Mayor	40	7,495	3	D
Eastern and Midland	Westmeath County Council	95,840	1,825	53	Mullingar	Cathaoirleach	20	4,792	2	WH
Eastern and Midland	Wicklow County Council	155,485	2,033	76	Wicklow	Cathaoirleach	32	4,859	3	WW
Northern and Western	Northern and Western	900,937								
Northern and Western	Cavan County Council	81,201	1,932	42	Cavan	Cathaoirleach	18	4,511	2	CN
Northern and Western	Donegal County Council	166,321	4,860	34	Lifford	Cathaoirleach	37	4,495	3	DL
Northern and Western	Galway City Council	83,456	53	1,575	Galway	Mayor	18	4,636	2	G
Northern and Western	Galway County Council	192,995	6,100	32	Galway	Cathaoirleach	39	4,949	3	G
Northern and Western	Leitrim County Council	35,087	1,589	22	Carrick-on-Shannon	Cathaoirleach	18	1,949	2	LM
Northern and Western	Mayo County Council	137,231	5,588	25	Castlebar	Cathaoirleach	30	4,574	3	MO
Northern and Western	Monaghan County Council	64,832	1,296	50	Monaghan	Cathaoirleach	18	3,602	2	MN
Northern and Western	Roscommon County Council	69,995	2,548	27	Roscommon	Cathaoirleach	18	3,889	2	RN
Northern and Western	Sligo County Council	69,819	1,838	38	Sligo	Cathaoirleach	18	3,879	2	SO
Southern	Southern	1,693,241								
Southern	Carlow County Council	61,931	898	69	Carlow	Cathaoirleach	18	3,441	2	CW
Southern	Clare County Council	127,419	3,442	37	Ennis	Cathaoirleach	28	4,551	2	CE
Southern	Cork City Council	222,333	198	1,123	Cork	Lord Mayor	31	7,172	2	C
Southern	Cork County Council	358,898	7,281	49	Cork	Mayor	55	6,525	5	C
Southern	Kerry County Council	155,258	4,735	33	Tralee	Cathaoirleach	33	4,705	3	KY
Southern	Kilkenny County Council	103,685	2,072	50	Kilkenny	Cathaoirleach	24	4,320	2	KK
Southern	Limerick City and County Council	205,444	2,760	74	Limerick	Mayor	40	5,136	3	L
Southern	Tipperary County Council	167,661	4,304	39	Clonmel & Nenagh	Cathaoirleach	40	4,192	3	T
Southern	Waterford City and County Council	127,085	1,859	68	Waterford	Mayor	32	3,971	2	W
Southern	Wexford County Council	163,527	2,365	69	Wexford	Cathaoirleach	34	4,810	3	WX
Ireland		5,123,536	70,182	73			949	5,399		

== European Union territorial divisions ==
Eurostat, the statistical Directorate-General of the European Union, uses a geographical hierarchy system called the Nomenclature of Territorial Units for Statistics (NUTS) for various statistical and financial disbursement purposes. The entirety of Ireland is a First-level NUTS of the European Union. The Second level (NUTS 2) divides Ireland into three regions which have a Regional Assembly. The Third level (NUTS 3) divides these regions into 8, each of which is a strategic planning area. Below this are local administrative units (LAUs) which are the basic statistical components for the regions; in Ireland these are the local electoral areas (LEAs).

== Funding ==
Following the abolition of domestic property rates in the late 1970s, local councils found it extremely difficult to raise money. The shortfall from the abolition of property rates led to the introduction of service charges for water and refuse, but these were highly unpopular in certain areas and led in certain cases to large-scale non-payment. Arising from a decision made by the Rainbow Government domestic water charges were abolished on 1 January 1997 placing further pressure on local government funding.

The Department of Finance is a significant source of funding at present, and additional sources are rates on commercial and industrial property, housing rents, service charges and borrowing. The dependence on Exchequer has led to charges that Ireland has an overly centralised system of local government. Numerous studies carried out by consultants on behalf of the Government have recommended the reintroduction of some form of local taxation/charging regime, but these were generally seen as politically unacceptable.

Since 1999, motor tax is paid into the Local Government Fund, established by the Local Government Act 1998, and is distributed on a "Needs and Resources" basis.

In 2013, a local property tax was introduced to provide funding for local authorities.

== Responsibilities ==
Local government bodies have responsibility for such matters as planning, local roads, sanitation, and libraries. The Minister for Housing, Planning and Local Government has responsibility for local authorities and related services. Fingal County Manager David O'Connor: "Local Authorities perform both a representational and an operational role because the Irish system of Local Government encompasses both democratic representation and public administration."

Local government has progressively lost control over services to national and regional bodies, particularly since the foundation of the state in 1922. For instance, local control of education has largely been passed to Education and Training Boards, established in 2013, while other bodies such as the Department of Education and Youth still hold significant powers. In 1970 local government lost its health remit, which had been already eroded by the creation of the Department of Health in 1947, to the health board system. In the 1990s the National Roads Authority took overall authority for national roads projects, supported by local authorities who maintain the non-national roads system. The whole area of waste management has been transformed since the 1990s, with a greater emphasis on environmental protection, recycling infrastructure and higher environmental standards. In 1993 the Environmental Protection Agency was established to underpin a more pro-active and co-ordinated national and local approach to protecting the environment. An Bord Pleanála was established in 1977 (restructured as An Coimisiún Pleanála in 2025) and assumed some of the planning responsibilities which had been the responsibility of local authorities. Additionally, the trend has been to remove decision-making from elected councillors to full-time professionals and officials. In particular, every city and county has a manager, who is the chief executive but is also a public servant appointed by the Public Appointments Service (formerly the Civil Service and Local Appointments Commission), and is thus answerable to the national government as well as the local council, in theory. Therefore, local policy decisions are sometimes heavily influenced by the TDs who represent the local constituency in Dáil Éireann (the main chamber of parliament), and may be dictated by national politics rather than local needs.

== Local Government Management Agency ==
The Local Government Management Agency is an agency of the Department of Housing, Local Government and Heritage which provides a range of professional services to local authorities. It was established in 2012. It provides a central data management service to enable the collection of the Home Charge, the Non Principle Private Residence (NPPR) charge and the proposed water charge.

== See also ==
- City status in the Republic of Ireland
- Local government in Dublin
- Local government in Northern Ireland
- Category:Local councillors in the Republic of Ireland

== Bibliography ==
- Mark Callanan and Justin F. Keogan, Local Government in Ireland Inside Out (2003)
- Matthew Potter, The Government and the People of Limerick. The History of Limerick Corporation/City Council 1197–2006 (2006)
- Desmond Roche, Local Government in Ireland (1982)
