= 2024 Limerick mayoral election =

2024 Mayor of Limerick election

- 7 June 2024
- Turnout: 51.8%
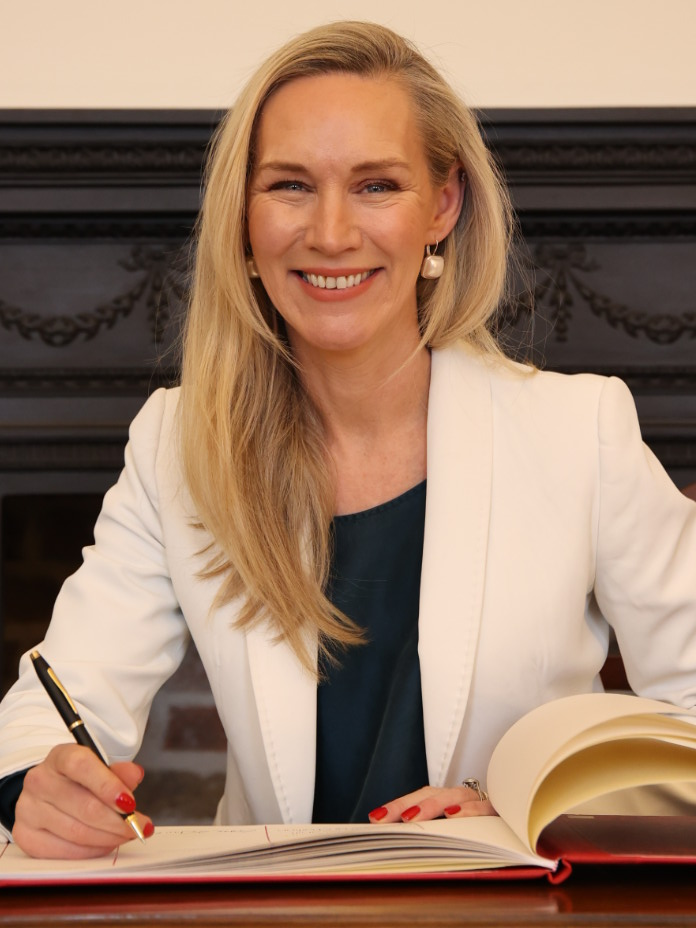

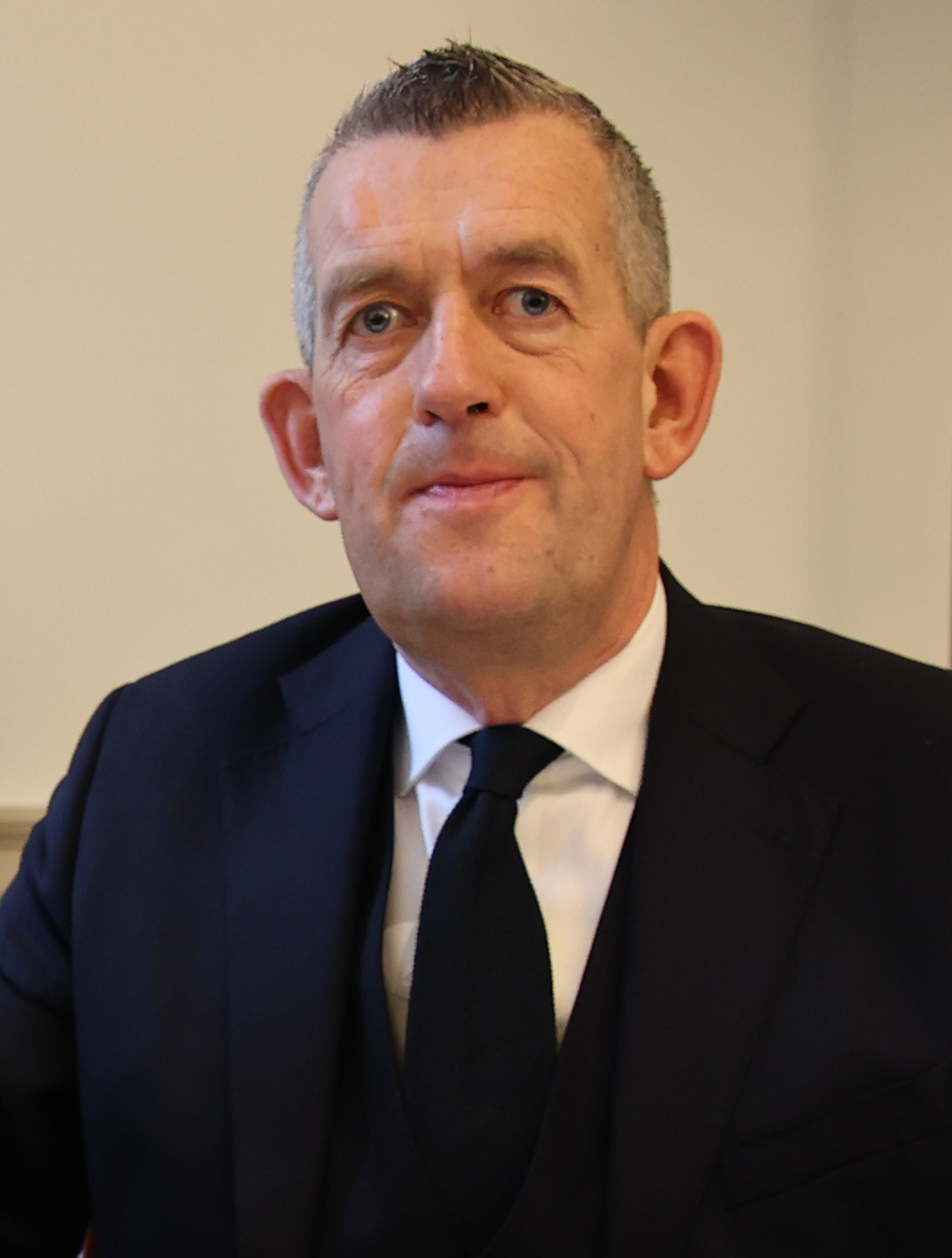
| | Ind | Ind |
| Candidate | John Moran | Helen O'Donnell | Dee Ryan |
| Party | Independent | Independent | Fianna Fáil |
| 1st preference | 18,308 (23.0%) | 12,903 (16.2%) | 11,785 (14.8%) |
| Final count | 28,451 (35.7%) | 23,829 (29.9%) | Eliminated |
| | FG | | Ind |
| Candidate | Daniel Butler | Maurice Quinlivan | Frankie Daly |
| Party | Fine Gael | Sinn Féin | Independent |
| 1st preference | 10,190 (12.8%) | 8,331 (10.5%) | 4,574 (5.7%) |
| Final count | Eliminated | Eliminated | Eliminated |
Mayor before election
Position established
Elected mayor
John Moran
Independent

An election to decide the first directly elected Mayor of Limerick was held on 7 June 2024, as part of the 2024 Irish local elections. Limerick is the first local authority in Ireland to have directly elected mayor, following a plebiscite held at the previous council election. The election was held under the Local Government (Mayor of Limerick) and Miscellaneous Provisions Act 2024. Candidates were nominated by a registered political party or with the support of 60 electors.

There were fifteen declared candidates in the contest for mayor, ten from political parties, and five independent candidates.

On 11 June 2024, John Moran was elected as mayor.

== Background ==
In May 2019 a plebiscite was held with the 2019 Limerick City and County Council election in which voters approved a proposal in a plebiscite on the establishment of a directly elected mayor for Limerick City and County by a vote of 52.4%. Under the Local Government (Mayor of Limerick) and Miscellaneous Provisions Act 2024, the first election to the new office would take place as part of the 2024 Limerick City and County Council election.

In August 2023, the Local Government (Mayor of Limerick) Bill 2023 was published. Kieran O'Donnell, Minister of State at the Department of Housing, Local Government and Heritage, stated that the government intended that the election for a directly elected Mayor for Limerick would be held in 2024, at the local elections which were scheduled to be held in June 2024.

The Local Government (Mayor of Limerick) and Miscellaneous Provisions Act 2024 was enacted on 6 March 2024. Under its provisions, the powers currently vested in the chief executive would be transferred to the Mayor of Limerick. On 5 April, Darragh O'Brien, the Minister for Housing, Local Government and Heritage, confirmed the date of 7 June 2024 by ministerial order.

== Campaign ==
On 27 February, former Secretary General of the Department of Finance, John Moran, announced his intention to run as an independent candidate in the election. He launched his campaign on 9 April in Newcastle West.

On 27 February, CEO of Limerick Chamber, Dee Ryan, declared her candidacy to seek the Fianna Fáil nomination for the election. Ryan was confirmed as the party's candidate on 11 March following an internal consultation process and was endorsed by Tánaiste Micheál Martin and Limerick TD Willie O'Dea.

On 11 March, businesswoman Helen O'Donnell announced her candidacy as an independent and launched her campaign that day at Limerick's Strand Hotel.

On 3 April, Limerick TD, Maurice Quinlivan, was selected as the Sinn Féin candidate for the election.

On 11 April, Limerick City and County Councillor, Conor Sheehan, announced his candidacy to seek the Labour Party nomination. He was selected as the party's candidate at a meeting of Labour members on 22 April.

On 12 April, Limerick City and County Councillor and former Mayor, Daniel Butler, was nominated as Fine Gael's candidate at a selection convention at Limerick Racecourse and was endorsed by Taoiseach Simon Harris.

On 14 April, Limerick City and County Councillor, Frankie Daly, announced on social media that he would be running as an independent.

== Debates ==
2024 Limerick mayoral election debates
| Date | Broadcaster | Moderator | Programme | Participants | | | | | | | | | | | | | | |
| P Participant A Absent invitee | | | | Moran | O'Donnell | Ryan | Butler | Quinlivan | Daly | Sheehan | O'Donovan | Beasley | Leddin | Keyes | Ní Chatháin | Uunk | Fahy | Ó Móráin |
|---|---|---|---|---|---|---|---|---|---|---|---|---|---|---|---|---|---|---|
| 21 May | Limerick Post; Limerick Chamber | Pat Leahy | N/A | P | P | P | P | P | P | P | P | A | P | P | A | A | A | A |
| 27 May | RTÉ One | Katie Hannon | Upfront with Katie Hannon | P | P | P | P | P | P | P | P | P | P | P | P | P | P | P |

== Result ==
The period for nominations started at 10 a.m. on Saturday 11 May and ended at 12 p.m. on Saturday 18 May 2024. Candidates may be nominated by a registered political party, with the support of 60 assentors, or with a deposit of €1,000. There were fifteen declared candidates for the election.

2024 Mayor of Limerick
| Party | Candidate | FPv% | Count | | | | | | | | | | | |
| Party | Candidate | FPv% | 1 | 2 | 3 | 4 | 5 | 6 | 7 | 8 | 9 | 10 | 11 | 12 |
|---|---|---|---|---|---|---|---|---|---|---|---|---|---|---|
| Independent | John Moran | 23.0 | 18,308 | 18,363 | 18,397 | 18,462 | 18,618 | 19,080 | 19,350 | 19,719 | 20,982 | 22,290 | 24,958 | 28,451 |
| Independent | Helen O'Donnell | 16.2 | 12,903 | 12,991 | 13,016 | 13,061 | 13,275 | 13,588 | 13,938 | 14,288 | 15,389 | 16,688 | 19,353 | 23,829 |
| Fianna Fáil | Dee Ryan | 14.8 | 11,785 | 11,843 | 11,864 | 11,939 | 12,081 | 12,370 | 12,540 | 12,937 | 13,965 | 15,473 | 18,575 | |
| Fine Gael | Daniel Butler | 12.8 | 10,190 | 10,249 | 10,274 | 10,316 | 10,420 | 10,731 | 10,962 | 11,337 | 12,385 | 13,632 | | |
| Sinn Féin | Maurice Quinlivan | 10.5 | 8,331 | 8,356 | 8,438 | 8,509 | 8,693 | 8,845 | 9,156 | 9,528 | 11,571 | | | |
| Independent | Frankie Daly | 5.7 | 4,574 | 4,597 | 4,645 | 4,686 | 4,815 | 4,907 | 5,410 | 5,689 | | | | |
| Aontú | Sarah Beasley | 3.3 | 2,635 | 2,662 | 2,698 | 2,738 | 2,811 | 2,859 | | | | | | |
| Labour | Conor Sheehan | 3.0 | 2,390 | 2,404 | 2,439 | 2,480 | 2,614 | 2,946 | 3,047 | | | | | |
| Social Democrats | Elisa O'Donovan | 3.0 | 2,384 | 2,401 | 2,478 | 2,526 | 3,061 | 3,336 | 3,439 | 3,799 | | | | |
| Green | Brian Leddin | 2.9 | 2,303 | 2,313 | 2,368 | 2,409 | 2,578 | | | | | | | |
| Rabharta | Laura Keyes | 1.4 | 1,079 | 1,089 | 1,122 | 1,165 | | | | | | | | |
| Independent | Caitríona Ní Chatháin | 1.1 | 886 | 896 | 990 | 1,016 | | | | | | | | |
| Party for Animal Welfare | Gerben Uunk | 0.9 | 758 | 768 | 788 | | | | | | | | | |
| People Before Profit | Ruairi Fahy | 0.8 | 689 | 692 | | | | | | | | | | |
| Independent | Colm Ó Móráin | 0.6 | 530 | | | | | | | | | | | |
Electorate: 157,672 Valid: 79,745 Spoilt: 1,923 Quota: 39,873 Turnout: 81,668 (51.8%)
