= Helen O'Donnell =

Irish businesswoman

Helen O'Donnell (née O'Connor, born 1960/1961) is an Irish businesswoman who is co-founder of Team Limerick Clean-up. She was a candidate in the 2024 Limerick mayoral election, and finished in 2nd place.

== Early life ==
She was born in Sligo and was educated at Grange National School, Grange Vocational School, Convent of Mercy Claremorris, and College of Catering RTC Galway.

== Career ==
In 1994, O'Donnell was invited by John Bruton to sit as an alternate delegate for Fine Gael on the Forum for Peace and Reconciliation. The same year, she opened her first business; an art-and-craft gallery and restaurant.

In 2011, she founded Limerick City Tidy Towns and three years later she received the national Hero Award at Tidy Towns. In 2015, along with J. P. McManus and Paul O'Connell, she co-founded the annual Team Limerick Clean-Up, a one-day tidy happening every Good Friday and attracting over 20,000 volunteers from various towns in the county.

She sat as chair of Crescent College's board of management, Limerick City Business Association, Adapt Domestic Abuse Services and PAUL Partnership, and the Safefood advisory board. Founded in 1999, Safefood is one of six North-South implementation bodies established under the terms of the British–Irish Agreement. She represented Limerick Chamber at the National Retail Forum.

In 2013, she was awarded the Limerick Person of the Year award and was honoured with a civic reception in 2020. That same year, she was "grand marshal" of the Limerick St Patrick's Day Parade.

She ran the Hunt Cafe in the Hunt Museum for twenty-five years, until 2022.

She was a former honorary national secretary of Fine Gael.

=== Limerick mayoral candidacy ===
In March 2023, O'Donnell announced that she would stand in the 2024 Limerick mayoral election, Limerick's first ever direct election for the position of mayor. She received the endorsement of businessman J. P. McManus, whose benevolent fund she served on the board of. O'Donnell finished second in the results, losing to John Moran on the 12th count.

== Personal life ==
In 1984, she married Tom O'Donnell, and they had one son. Her husband was a Fine Gael politician who served as a TD, MEP and cabinet minister. Her nephew through marriage, Kieran O'Donnell, is a Fine Gael TD for Limerick City.
