= Brian Leddin =

Irish politician

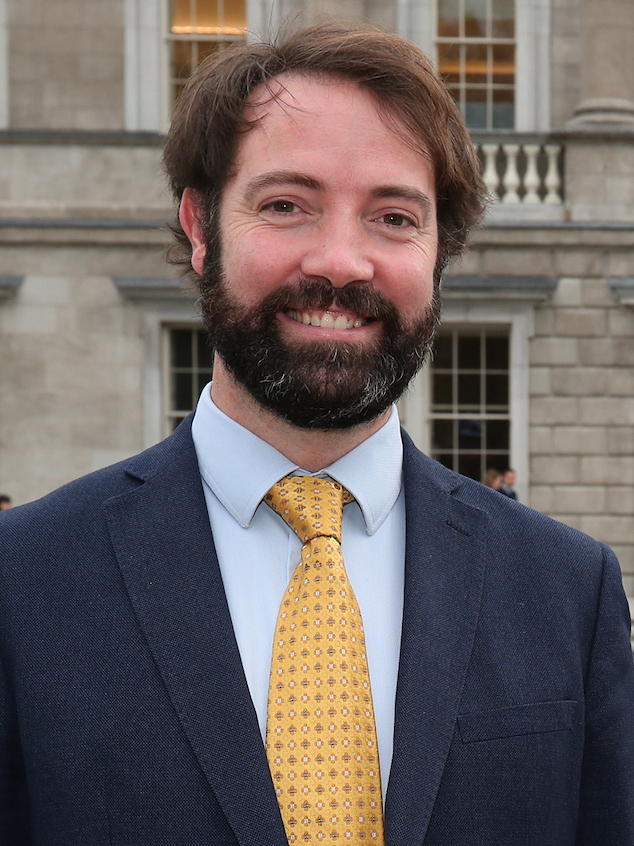
- Leddin in 2022

Chair of the Committee on Climate Action
- In office 15 September 2020 – 8 November 2024
- Preceded by: Hildegarde Naughton

Teachta Dála
- In office February 2020 – November 2024
- Constituency: Limerick City

Personal details
- Born: 1979/1980 (age 46–47) Limerick, Ireland
- Party: Green Party (until 2025)
- Education: University of Limerick; Loughborough University

Brian Leddin (born 1979/1980) is a former Irish politician and former Green Party member who served as a Teachta Dála (TD) for the Limerick City constituency from 2020 to 2024. He was appointed Chair of the Joint Oireachtas Committee on Climate Action in September 2020, and was a member of the Joint Oireachtas Committee on Agriculture, Food and the Marine, and Chair of the Green Party's parliamentary party. He was the Green Party spokesperson for Transport, Energy and Climate Action. He left the Green party in 2025 due to the party's decision to support Catherine Connolly's presidential campaign.

== Political career ==
Brian Leddin joined the Green Party in 2017. When he successfully ran in the 2019 local elections, he became the Green Party's first-ever Limerick City and County Councillor, representing Limerick North Central ward, and his election as a TD to the 33rd Dáil in February 2020 made him the first Green Party TD from Limerick. Leddin was unsuccessful in retaining his seat in the 2024 General election coming in 10th securing 4.2% of the vote, he was eliminated on the 7th count. Leddin ran in the 2024 Limerick Mayoral Election coming in 10th securing 2.9% of the vote, he was eliminated on the 5th count.

=== Committee on Climate Action ===
The Climate Action and Low Carbon Development (Amendment) Act 2021 set Ireland on a legally-binding path to net-zero emissions no later than 2050, and to a 51 per cent reduction in emissions by the end of this decade. Of the Climate Bill and subsequent climate action, Leddin said "With societal transformation will come unparalleled economic and employment opportunities – in renewable energy, nature conservation, sustainable transport and in retrofitting our homes and schools and hospitals. Climate action will help rebalance our society as a fairer and healthier one, which treads far more lightly on our land."

The Climate Bill had undergone extensive pre-legislative scrutiny to strengthen the bill by the Joint Oireachtas Committee on Climate Action, of which Brian Leddin is Chair, publishing its report on the draft of the bill on 18 December 2020. The report made 78 recommendations to the draft bill, with Leddin acknowledging the cross party, collaborative nature of the work.

On 21 April 2021, Leddin spoke in the Dáil debate on the Climate Action and Low Carbon Development (Amendment) Bill 2021: Second Stage. He spoke on the collaborative cross-party work of the Joint Oireachtas Committee on Climate Action, the employment opportunities presented in the renewable energy sector along the West coast, and the impact of climate action on societal transformation for better quality of life, for a fairer and healthier society, while acknowledging the scale of the challenge ahead.

=== Controversies ===
In June 2021, Leddin was accused of a conflict of interest after it was revealed that Arup, his former employer of five years, were consulting engineers on the Shannon LNG project. Leddin denied knowing that his former employers were acting as consulting engineers for the project, as he had left the company at that stage. He outlined that any ruling on amendments out of order is on the advice of the Oireachtas officials and that this advice is strictly in compliance with standing orders. The Bills Office in the Houses of the Oireachtas scrutinises the text of any amendments to a bill submitted by members as it goes through Committee Stage and Report Stage to ensure it complies with Standing Orders, Rulings of the Chair and other matters of order.

Leddin came under fire for posting an image on Twitter in July 2021 of a scene from Father Ted where the character Tom is shooting crows, in response to a discussion about managing seagulls. Pauline McLynn criticised him for the post, saying they were "disgraceful" and that the Green Party should be "appalled" by his behaviour". Leddin responded that the image was posted in jest and reiterated his commitment to animal welfare and protection.

In August 2021, Leddin met with his party's executive after comments he made referring to Councillor Elisa O’Donovan who he was previously involved in a romantic relationship Leddin's comments in the private, WhatsApp group chat stated that O'Donovan was "unhinged" and "craving fame". The content of the group chat was leaked by one of the members for which his fellow Green Party TD Neasa Hourigan called for him to be sanctioned. The Executive Council of the Green Party made the decision not to sanction him. .

He resigned from the Green Party in October 2025, citing its support for Catherine Connolly in the 2025 presidential election.

== Personal life ==
Leddin's mother Kathleen is a former Mayor of Limerick and independent member of Limerick City Council, and his father Tim was also Mayor of Limerick and a Fine Gael member of Limerick City Council. His cousin, Joe Leddin, is a Labour Party member of Limerick City and County Council. His granduncle Michael Keyes was a Labour Party politician who served as a TD in 1927, and then from 1933 to 1957.

Outside of politics, Leddin is a qualified engineer with a degree in renewable energy systems technology.

Dáil	Election	Deputy (Party)	Deputy (Party)	Deputy (Party)	Deputy (Party)
31st	2011	Jan O'Sullivan (Lab)	Willie O'Dea (FF)	Kieran O'Donnell (FG)	Michael Noonan (FG)
32nd	2016	Jan O'Sullivan (Lab)	Willie O'Dea (FF)	Maurice Quinlivan (SF)	Michael Noonan (FG)
33rd	2020	Brian Leddin (GP)	Willie O'Dea (FF)	Maurice Quinlivan (SF)	Kieran O'Donnell (FG)
34th	2024	Conor Sheehan (Lab)	Willie O'Dea (FF)	Maurice Quinlivan (SF)	Kieran O'Donnell (FG)
