= Mayor of Limerick =

Political official in Limerick

- Irish: Méara Luimnigh
- Incumbent; John Moran since 21 June 2024
- Style: Mayor
- Type: Council leader
- Status: Chief executive officer
- Seat: City Hall, Limerick
- Appointer: Electorate of Limerick
- Term length: 5 years, renewable once
- Inaugural holder: John Spafford
- Formation: 1195
- Salary: €151,856
- Website: Official website

The Mayor of Limerick is the head of the local government of the City and County of Limerick. It is a directly elected office with a five-year term. Following the 2024 Limerick mayoral election, John Moran was inaugurated as the first office-holder on 21 June 2024.

Prior to June 2024, it was the title used by the chairperson of Limerick City and County Council. Prior to the amalgamation of the city and county councils in 2014, the mayor was the chairperson of Limerick City Council. The office was originally established in 1195 and reinforced by a charter issued in 1197.

== Election to the office prior to June 2024 ==
Before the introduction of the executive mayor system, the ceremonial mayor was elected to office annually by councillors of Limerick City and County Council from amongst its members. The practice was for the term of office to begin in June with the former Mayor presenting the Chain of Office to the incoming Mayor, thus formally inaugurating a new term. The process was repeated the following June, unless the same person was given a second consecutive term. Under the previous system, the mayor was the chairperson of the City and County Council.

== Directly elected mayor ==
In May 2019 a plebiscite was held with the 2019 Limerick City and County Council election in which voters approved the establishment of a directly elected mayor for Limerick City and County by a vote of 52.4%. In August 2023, the Local Government (Mayor of Limerick) Bill 2023 was published. Kieran O'Donnell, Minister of State at the Department of Housing, Local Government and Heritage, stated that it was the intention of the government that the election for a directly elected Mayor for Limerick would be held in 2024, at the local elections which was held on 7 June 2024. The Local Government (Mayor of Limerick) and Miscellaneous Provisions Act 2024 was enacted in March 2024.

The first election to the new office took place on 7 June 2024 in conjunction with the 2024 Limerick City and County Council election. John Moran was elected mayor and was inaugurated at a ceremony at Limerick's oldest building, St Mary's Cathedral, on 21 June 2024.

Following the inauguration of the first directly-elected mayor, the chief executive of the council was renamed as the director general and the chair of the council became known as the Príomh Chomhairleoir (lit. 'Head Councillor')).

== History of the office ==
The office has existed, in one form or another, since it was inaugurated in 1195. The title of Provost was used up to the 14th century.

== Selected list of mayors ==
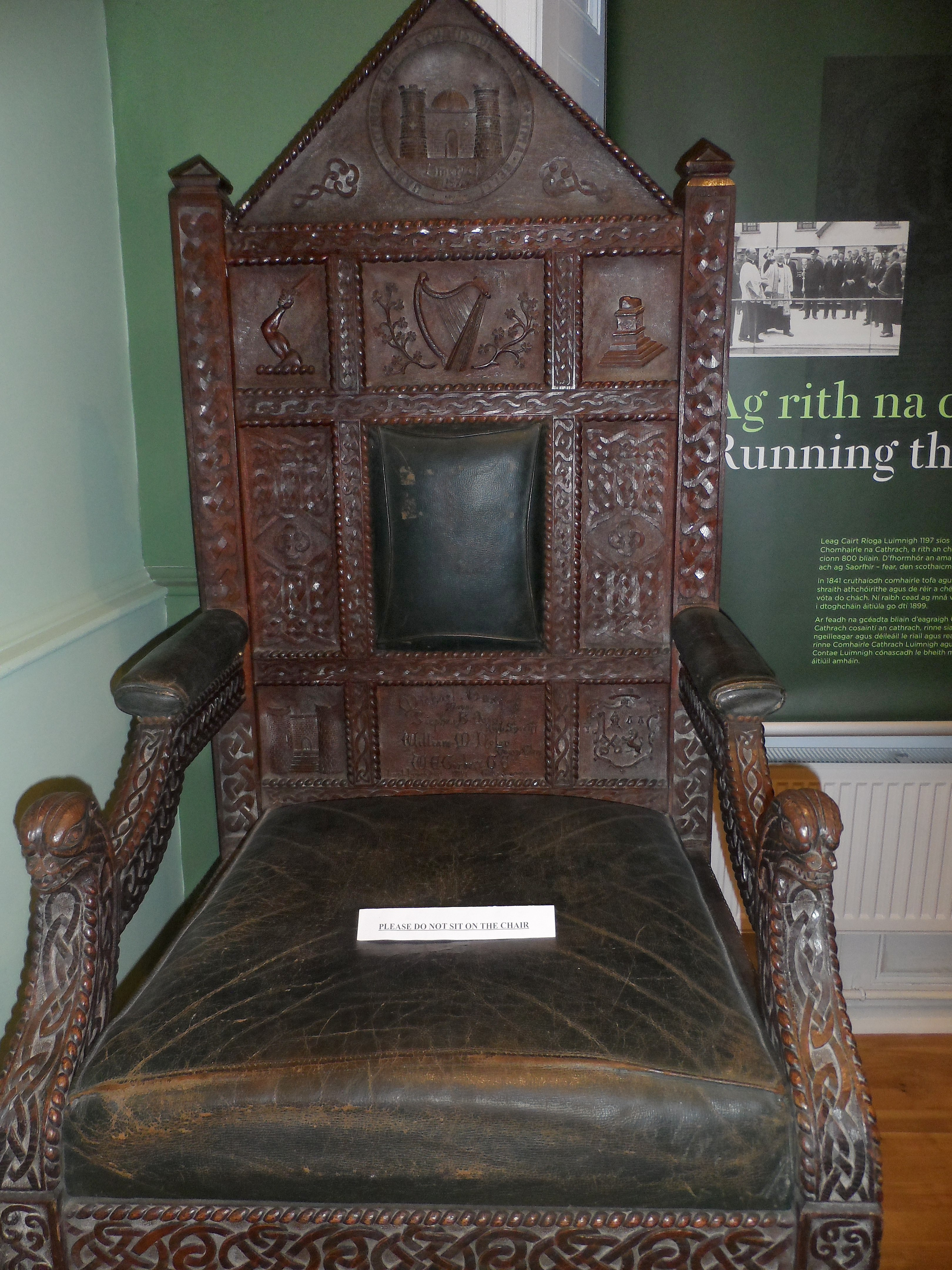
Throne of Limerick mayors

- Thomas Smyth (1764–1765, 1776–1777), MP and Colonel of Limerick Militia
- John Vereker, 3rd Viscount Gort (1831–1832), MP and later Irish Peer
- Stephen O'Mara (1885–1887), nationalist MP and later Cumann na nGaedheal Senator, first nationalist Mayor of Limerick
- John Daly (1899–1901), revolutionary nationalist MP, leading member of Irish Republican Brotherhood involved in 1867 rising
- Michael Joyce (1905–1907), nationalist MP, leader of Irish National League, founder of Garryowen Football Club
- Phons O'Mara (1918–1920), republican, negotiated truce with Limerick Soviet in 1919
- George Clancy (1921), Sinn Féin Mayor shot dead in office by Black and Tans in 1921
- Stephen M. O'Mara (1921–1923), republican politician, later Fianna Fail member of the Council of State
- Michael Keyes (1928–1930), Labour Party TD, Minister for Local Government and Posts and Telegraphs and President of the Irish Trades Union Congress, the first Limerick person to be a cabinet member since independence
- Stephen Coughlan (1951–1952, 1969–1970), Labour Party TD
- Ted Russell (1954–1957, 1967–1968, 1976–1977), Independent and later Fine Gael politician, TD and Senator,
- Donogh O'Malley (1961–1962), Fianna Fail Minister for Education and Health, introduced free secondary education up to Intermediate Certificate
- Frances Condell (1962–1964), first elected woman Mayor
- Michael Lipper (1973–1974), Democratic Labour and Labour Party TD
- Pat Kennedy (1974–1975), Fine Gael Senator
- Thady Coughlan (1975–1976), Labour Party, aged 24, youngest Mayor since 1842
- Frank Prendergast (1977–1978, 1984–1985), Labour Party TD
- Tony Bromell (1982–1983), Fianna Fail Senator
- Jim Kemmy (1991–1992, 1995–1996), Labour Party TD
- Jan O'Sullivan (1993–1994), later Labour Party Senator, TD, Minister for Education and Skills
- Kevin Kiely (2009–2010), Fine Gael councillor
- John Moran (2024–present), first directly-elected mayor

== See also ==
- Lord Mayor of Dublin
- Lord Mayor of Cork
- Mayor of Galway
