= Dee Ryan =

Irish politician

Senator Dee Ryan
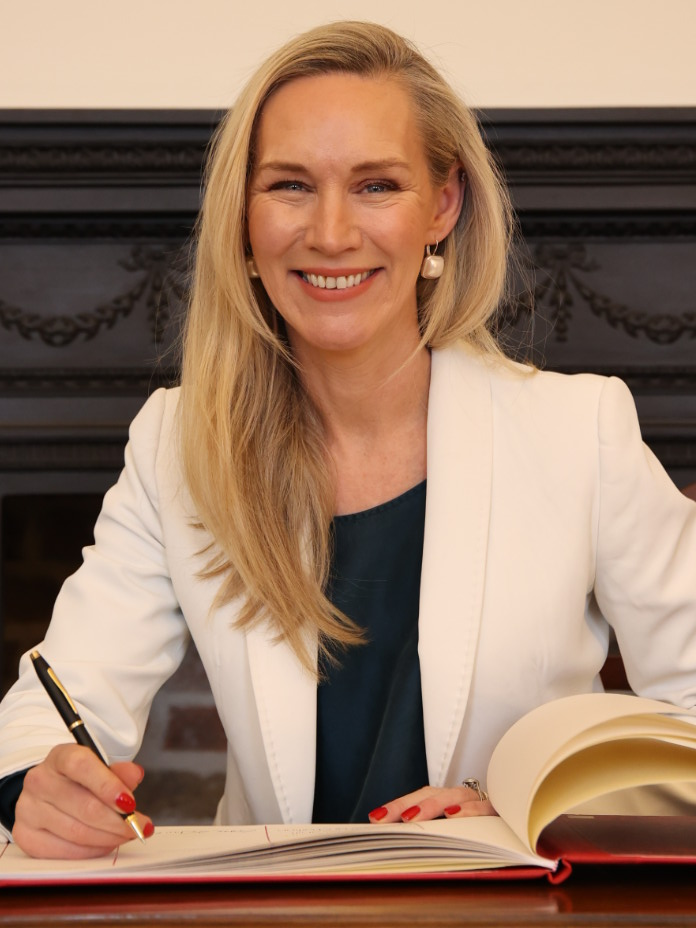
- Ryan in 2025

Senator
- Incumbent
- Assumed office 7 February 2025
- Constituency: Nominated by the Taoiseach

Personal details
- Born: Deirdre Corbett Limerick, Ireland
- Party: Fianna Fáil
- Spouse: Michael Ryan
- Education: University of Limerick

Dee Ryan is an Irish Fianna Fáil politician who has been a senator since February 2025 after being nominated by the Taoiseach.

== Political career ==
Ryan was an unsuccessful candidate in the 2024 Limerick mayoral election, as well as in the Limerick City constituency at the 2024 general election. She contested the 2025 Seanad election for the Industrial and Commercial Panel but was not elected.

Ryan was formerly the CEO of Limerick Chamber, and Managing Director of SPARK Marketing. She is the daughter of Valerie and Brian Corbett, a chartered accountant who operated Corbett & Associates Chartered Accountants in Limerick City. Ryan was recruited by Taoiseach Micheál Martin as the party's candidate for the Limerick Mayoral election contest in 2024.
