= Thady Coughlan =

Thady Coughlan (born 3 March 1951) is a former Limerick City Councillor and former Mayor of Limerick. He is the son of former Mayor Stephen Coughlan. He is the youngest person to become Mayor of Limerick since the ousting of the "corrupt Corporation" in 1842.

== Early life ==
Thady Coughlan was born in Limerick on 3 March 1951 into a political family. His father, Stephen Coughlan, was Mayor of Limerick from 1951 to 1952 and again from 1969 to 1970.

He grew up on Barrington Street in Limerick city before his family moved to Wellington Place, off O'Connell Avenue. He received his primary education at St Philomena's National School before attending secondary school at St Munchin's College. One of his classmates in secondary school was Paddy Madden who would become Mayor of Limerick in 1988.

== Political career ==
In 1974, he was elected to Limerick City Council as a Labour Party councillor, while his father was still a member. This marked the first time since 1842 that a father and son served on the council together. In 1975, he was elected Mayor of Limerick. At age 24, he was a year younger than the previous youngest Mayor William O'Donnel (Mayor in 1890).

In August of that year, he represented Limerick Corporation at the funeral of Éamon de Valera. In October of the same year, he was present at the canonisation of Oliver Plunkett, where he met the then Pope Paul VI and future Pope John Paul II who was bishop of Kraków at the time.

== Retirement from politics ==
Thady Coughlan retired from public office in 1979 at the age of 28. He had commenced employment at the Anglo Irish Bank in 1977, and became heavily involved in rugby in the city. In 2000 he became president of Shannon RFC before becoming manager of the team in 2001. As of 2007, he was residing in Crecora, County Limerick.

Political offices
Preceded by Patrick Kennedy	Mayor of Limerick; 1975–1976	Succeeded by Ted Russell
