= Willie O'Dea affidavit incident =

2010 political controversy

The Willie O'Dea affidavit incident or Brothelgate was a 2010 political controversy in Ireland involving Minister for Defence Willie O'Dea.

Enda Kenny, leader of main opposition party Fine Gael, accused O'Dea of having committed perjury after it emerged remarks which he had sworn under an affidavit not to have said had in fact been said. The remarks related to the alleged connection between a brothel and Sinn Féin politician Maurice Quinlivan. These allegations were later proven to be untrue. O'Dea and Quinlivan had settled High Court damages over the incident in December 2009. However, increasing parliamentary pressure in February 2010 propelled the affair back into the spotlight. O'Dea resigned as Minister for Defence on 18 February 2010, with Taoiseach Brian Cowen assigning himself temporary responsibility for the Department of Defence.

Stephen Collins, writing in The Irish Times, suggested "Relations between the Coalition partners [Fianna Fáil and the Green Party] may never be the same again after the resignation of Willie O'Dea". According to the Evening Herald, the departure of O'Dea was "the first major casualty of the coalition government". The same newspaper noted that the resignation of O'Dea was the third in two "absolutely calamitous" weeks, following the unexpected departures of George Lee and Déirdre de Búrca from Fine Gael and the Green Party respectively.

== Background and defamation controversy ==
On 12 January 2009, three Brazilian women were arrested in an apartment in Limerick city. They were charged the following day with brothel-keeping. The three received suspended sentences of six months each and were ordered to leave Limerick city within three days. The apartment had been rented out to them by Nessan Quinlivan, a former Provisional IRA volunteer and the brother of Sinn Féin candidate for Limerick City Council Maurice Quinlivan. During the court hearing there was no mention of Quinlivan being the landlord and there was no suggestion that he knew a brothel was being kept at the apartment. The Garda Síochána stated in the court hearing that the women were "pawns" of a larger operation.

The controversy leading to O'Dea's resignation as Minister for Defence centred on remarks he made concerning Maurice Quinlivan to Limerick Leader journalist Mike Dwane in 2009 in the run up to the local elections of that year. During the interview, O'Dea made references to the brothel that had operated in the apartment owned by Nessan Quinlivan One of the most damaging of these was, "I suppose I'm going a bit too far when I say this but I'd like to ask Mr Quinlivan is the brothel still closed?"

The interview was published on 10 March 2009. Dwane recorded the interview.

O'Dea swore under oath an affidavit that he had not made this remark. He later retracted this denial after a tape recording of the interview emerged. Damages were paid to Quinlivan by O'Dea following a High Court defamation challenge by Maurice Quinlivan in December 2009. O'Dea apologised for the remarks in court on 21 December.

== Events surrounding resignation ==
In February 2010, there were increased efforts by politicians to explain his behaviour. Fine Gael Senator Eugene Regan brought the matter to the attention of the Oireachtas and stated that O'Dea ought to resign from office. On 15 February 2010, Labour Party TD Jan O'Sullivan asked that he explain himself as the Minister's Sunday newspaper column indicated he was aware that the interview was being recorded.

When O'Dea protested on 16 February that he had erred unintentionally Labour Party TD Pat Rabbitte said he had "a cheek" to blame forgetfulness. Later that day Fine Gael leader Enda Kenny announced he would table a motion of no confidence in O'Dea, to be debated in Dáil Éireann. The motion was debated on the afternoon of 17 February, with O'Dea passing by 80 votes for and 69 votes against. Fianna Fáil's partners in coalition, the Green Party, supported O'Dea at this point. Vincent Browne, writing in that day's edition of The Irish Times, predicted that O'Dea had "nothing to fear" as "Green Party compliance has allowed Fianna Fáil to get away with doing whatever it likes". However, Green Party chairman Dan Boyle used Facebook and Twitter to express his lack of confidence in O'Dea, saying the man was "compromised" and that he ought to resign. "The treacherous tweet" was one term for what Boyle had done. RTÉ described Boyle's act as "deliberate", suggesting that "its significance could grow were there to be further revelations about the affidavit affair". It was the first indication that the Green Party were not fully supporting O'Dea. By the end of the week it was being seen as central to the outcome of events.

The following morning, a series of what were described as "rowdy exchanges" took place in Dáil Éireann, forcing it to be suspended for a period. Fine Gael leader Enda Kenny accused O'Dea of having committed perjury, a comment he would not withdraw despite Tánaiste Mary Coughlan's insistence. Meanwhile, Green Party member Gary Fitzgerald, a former unsuccessful local election candidate, complained to the Garda Síochána's Bridewell station staff about O'Dea's conduct. An audio recording of the interview emerged in public for the first time and was broadcast repeatedly on national radio. That afternoon O'Dea denied he had committed perjury in a live radio interview with Sean O'Rourke on RTÉ News at One, saying that he had made "a stupid, silly mistake". He was among several TDs who failed to turn up for a parliamentary vote on a finance bill which the government only narrowly won by the casting vote of the Ceann Comhairle, the first time in almost twenty years that this was needed. O'Dea resigned as Minister for Defence that evening. Taoiseach Brian Cowen responded to his resignation by assigning himself temporary responsibility for the Department of Defence. Tony Killeen was later appointed as Minister of Defence. O'Dea said he decided to resign when it became clear that the Green Party would no longer support the Government if he was to stay in office.

== Reaction ==
Newspapers in Ireland discussed O'Dea's resignation the following day. "Yet more proof that Fianna Fail simply don't get it", The Irish Times informed its readers. The Irish Independent said the Green Party was responsible for O'Dea's resignation and noted that he would receive compensation of €100,000.

Defamation victim Councillor Maurice Quinlivan welcomed the Minister's resignation, describing his position as "untenable" and expressing joy that the "sorry saga" had been "finally put to bed".

Dan Boyle said the Green Party would remain as Fianna Fáil's coalition partners after the resignation of O'Dea.

Fine Gael TD Michael Noonan paid tribute to O'Dea, speaking of his "respect" for the former minister and acknowledging: "It is regrettable that Limerick will be without a Cabinet minister for the foreseeable future".

Fine Gael TD Dinny McGinley criticised the Government for their handling of the affair, saying it had "brought standards in the Dáil to a new low".

O'Dea's first public comments following his resignation came on 19 February 2010:

It has been absolutely incredibly tough. Not only the last 24 hours but the last ten has been an enormous strain on myself and my family. Nobody who hasn't gone through this can realise how stressful it has been and it is something I'll take to my grave, it is something I certainly wouldn't want to go through again. [...] There are very few positives for me in this whole scenario obviously. The one positive I think is the huge groundswell of support I have got from the people here in Limerick – my constituents, my friends, my canvassers, my supporters and that has been very very heartening indeed.

O'Dea also admitted for the first time that the Green Party had pushed him aside.

Garda Commissioner Fachtna Murphy will decide soon whether to investigate the affair.

Former RTÉ 2fm disc jockey and friend of O'Dea Michael McNamara described O'Dea's departure as "a bad day for Limerick".

In Cork on 20 February Green Party leader John Gormley said that prior to the Minister's resignation he had told Taoiseach Brian Cowen that O'Dea's position was "untenable and the stability of the Government would be under threat as a consequence and it would prove a real distraction" if he did go.

On 18 March 2010, an opinion poll found that almost 63% of the Limerick population believed it was necessary for Willie O'Dea to resign as Defence Minister.

Scandal database GateCrimes rates Brothelgate 'Totally a Gate'.

== Song ==
Limerick rap duo The Rubberbandits achieved success online with their lampoon "A Song for Willie O'Dea".
