= Maurice Quinlivan =

Irish politician (born 1967/1968)

Maurice Quinlivan TD
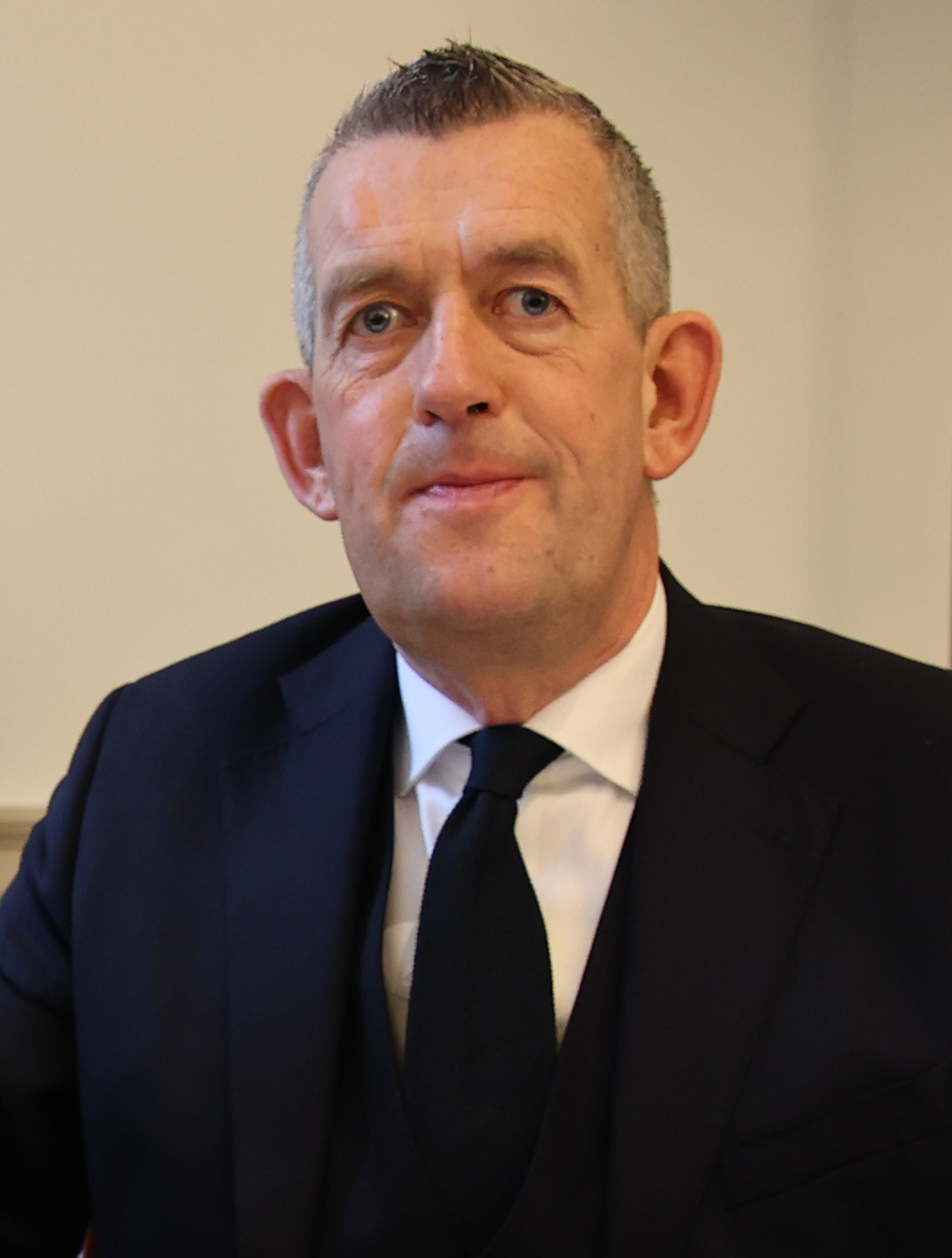
- Quinlivan in 2024

Teachta Dála
- Incumbent
- Assumed office February 2016
- Constituency: Limerick City

Chair of the Committee on Enterprise, Trade and Employment
- In office 15 September 2020 – 8 November 2024
- Preceded by: Mary Butler

Personal details
- Born: 1967/1968 (age 58–59) Limerick, Ireland
- Party: Sinn Féin
- Spouse: Sue Quinlivan (m. 2003)
- Relatives: Nessan Quinlivan (brother)
- Education: Limerick Institute of Technology
- Website: mauricequinlivan.ie

Quinlivan's office in Limerick

Maurice Quinlivan (born 1967/1968) is an Irish Sinn Féin politician who has been a Teachta Dála (TD) for the Limerick City constituency since the 2016 general election. He was appointed Chair of the Committee on Enterprise, Trade and Employment in September 2020. He was chosen as Sinn Féin's nominee for Mayor of Limerick, at the 2024 election.

He gained prominence for being libelled by Willie O'Dea, while O'Dea was Minister for Defence.

== Personal life ==
He was born in Ballynanty and resides in nearby Stenson Park, Limerick, with his wife. His brother Nessan Quinlivan is a former Provisional IRA volunteer. He has 3 sisters.

== Political career ==
=== Early elections ===
He previously ran unsuccessfully as a Sinn Féin candidate at the 2004 local elections for Limerick City Council and for Limerick East at the 2007 general election.

=== 2009 defamation case ===
During the 2009 local election campaign, Willie O'Dea gave an interview to the Limerick Leader. In response to criticism about the use of Department of Defence resources for constituency work, O'Dea attacked Quinlivan and claimed that Quinlivan was running a brothel.

Quinlivan responded by launching a High Court defamation challenge against O'Dea. As part of his defence O'Dea swore under oath an affidavit, that he had not made this remark. He was forced to retract his denial after the release of a recording of the conversation in which the allegations were made by O'Dea. The case was subsequently settled out of court with O'Dea paying an undisclosed sum in damages and apologising for the remarks. However, O'Dea was forced to resign as Minister for Defence, over accusations that he had committed perjury.

=== Limerick City Councillor (2009–2016) ===
Quinlivan was elected to Limerick City Council in 2009. On the council, Quinlivan has supported an extension of Limerick city's boundary, opposed the planned merger of Limerick City and County Councils and campaigned for greater resources to tackle Limerick's drug problem. He, along with Independent Councillor and former Mayor of Limerick John Gilligan, are the only two councillors on Limerick City Council to oppose to the Household charge. Both men have refused to pay the charge.

He was a candidate in the Limerick City constituency at the 2011 general election. He received 8.6% of the first preference votes, coming fifth in the four seat constituency ahead of incumbent Fianna Fáil TD Peter Power, and was not elected. He was re-elected at the 2014 local elections, topping the poll with 24.5% of the vote.

=== TD for Limerick City (2016–present) ===
Quinlivan was elected at the 2016 general election taking the second seat in the Limerick City constituency. He was re-elected at the 2020 general election, topping the poll ahead of his constituency rival, Willie O'Dea. In September 2020, Quinlivan was appointed as the Chair of the Committee on Enterprise, Trade and Employment.

On 3 April 2024, Sinn Féin chose Quinlivan as their nominee for the 2024 Limerick mayoral election. Quinlavin earned 8,331 first preference votes but was eliminated on the 9th count.

Quinlavin was re-elected in 2024 on the 13th count. He was subsequently appointed Cathaoirleach of the Committee on Disability Matters.

Dáil	Election	Deputy (Party)	Deputy (Party)	Deputy (Party)	Deputy (Party)
31st	2011	Jan O'Sullivan (Lab)	Willie O'Dea (FF)	Kieran O'Donnell (FG)	Michael Noonan (FG)
32nd	2016	Jan O'Sullivan (Lab)	Willie O'Dea (FF)	Maurice Quinlivan (SF)	Michael Noonan (FG)
33rd	2020	Brian Leddin (GP)	Willie O'Dea (FF)	Maurice Quinlivan (SF)	Kieran O'Donnell (FG)
34th	2024	Conor Sheehan (Lab)	Willie O'Dea (FF)	Maurice Quinlivan (SF)	Kieran O'Donnell (FG)
