= Limerick City and County Council =

Local authority for Limerick City and County in Ireland

Limerick City and County Council Comhairle Cathrach agus Contae Luimnigh

Type
- Type: City and County council

History
- Founded: 1 June 2014

Leadership
- Mayor: John Moran, Ind
- Príomh Chomhairleoir: Tom Ruddle, FG

Structure
- Seats: 40
- Political groups: Fine Gael (13) Fianna Fáil (10) Labour (2) Independent Ireland (2) Sinn Féin (2) Social Democrats (2) Aontú (1) Green (1) Independent (7)

Elections
- Last election: 7 June 2024

Meeting place
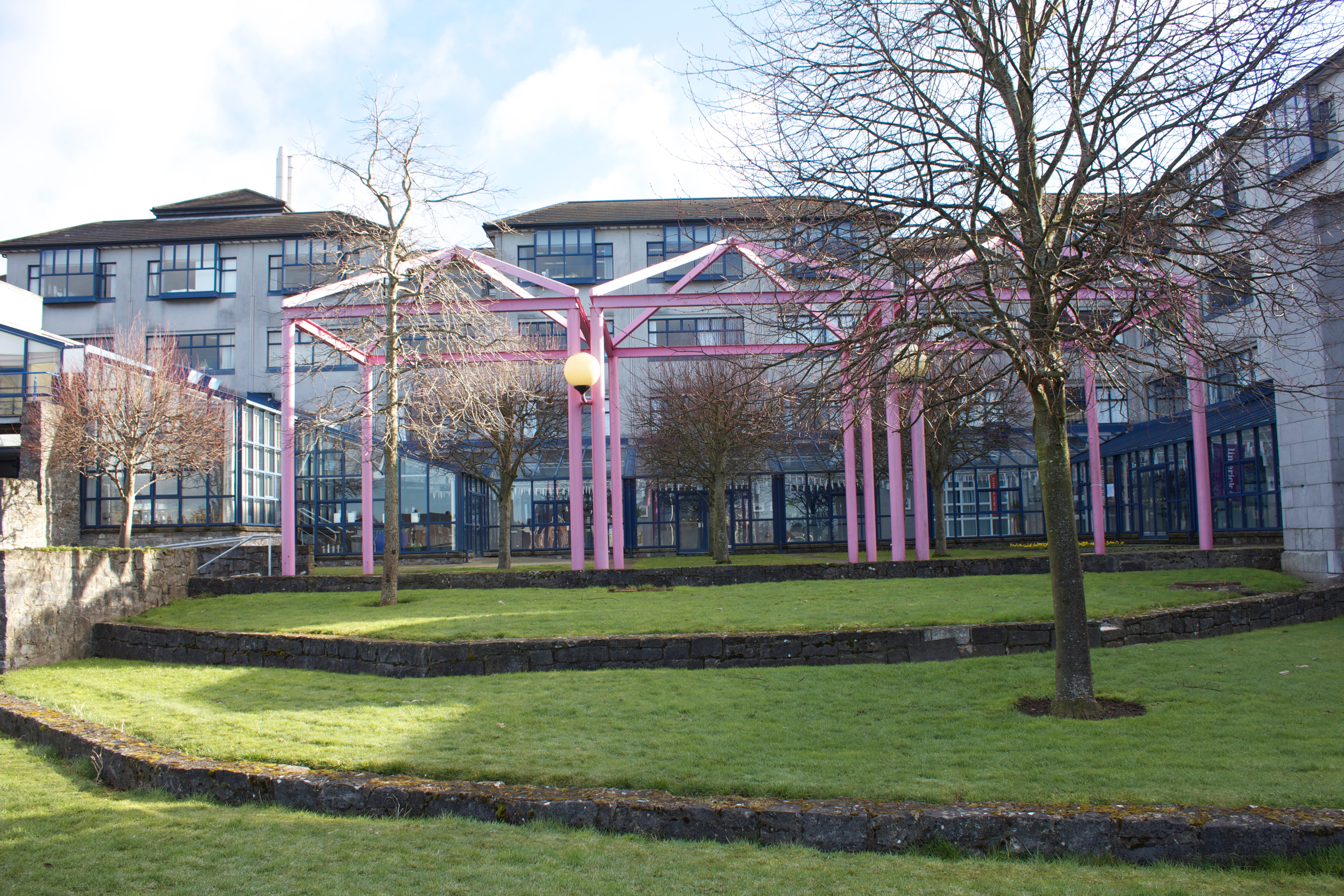
- City Hall, Limerick

Website
- Official website

The area governed by the council

Limerick City and County Council (Irish: Comhairle Cathrach agus Contae Luimnigh) is the local authority of Limerick City and County in Ireland. It came into operation on 1 June 2014 after the 2014 local elections. It was formed by the merger of Limerick City Council and Limerick County Council under the provisions of the Local Government Reform Act 2014. As a city and county council, it is governed by the Local Government Act 2001. The council is responsible for housing and community, roads and transportation, urban planning and development, amenity and culture, and environment. The council has 40 elected members. Elections are held every five years and are by single transferable vote. The head of the council has the title of Mayor. The city and county administration is headed by a director general, Pat Daly. The administrative centre is City Hall, Limerick, with other civic offices at Dooradoyle. Following a plebiscite in 2019, Limerick became the first local authority in Ireland with a directly elected mayor in 2024, when John Moran was elected for a five-year term.

== Directly elected mayor ==
At the 2019 local election, a plebiscite was held under Part 6 of the Local Government Act 2019 on the establishment of a directly elected mayor for Limerick City and County. Voters in Limerick approved the proposal by a vote of 52.4%. In January 2021, the government approved the publication of the report on a directly elected mayor for Limerick.

In August 2023, the Local Government (Mayor of Limerick) Bill 2023 was published. Kieran O'Donnell, Minister of State at the Department of Housing, Local Government and Heritage, stated that it was the intention of the government that the election for a directly elected Mayor for Limerick would be held on the same date as the 2024 local elections on 7 June 2024.

The Local Government (Mayor of Limerick) and Miscellaneous Provisions Act 2024 was signed on 6 March 2024.

Under the provisions of the 2024 act, the office of chief executive of the council was renamed as director general. Also, the office of Cathaoirleach was renamed as Príomh Chomhairleoir (lit. Chief Councillor). The Príomh Chomhairleoir is the chairperson of the council who holds office for one year.

== Regional Assembly ==
Limerick City and County Council has three representatives on the Southern Regional Assembly who are part of the Mid-West Strategic Planning Area Committee.

== Elections ==
Members of Limerick City and County Council are elected for a five-year term of office on the electoral system of proportional representation by means of the single transferable vote (PR-STV) from multi-member local electoral areas.

| Year | FG | FF | Lab | SF | GP | SD | II | Aon | AAA | Ind. | Total |
| 2024 | 13 | 10 | 3 | 3 | 1 | 2 | 2 | 1 | —N/a | 5 | 40 |
| 2019 | 14 | 12 | 3 | 2 | 2 | 1 | —N/a | —N/a | —N/a | 6 | 40 |
| 2014 | 12 | 13 | 3 | 6 | 0 | —N/a | —N/a | —N/a | 3 | 3 | 40 |

== Local electoral areas and municipal districts ==
Limerick City and County is divided into the following metropolitan and municipal districts and local electoral areas, defined by electoral divisions. The municipal district which contains the administrative area of the former Limerick City Council is referred to as a Metropolitan District.

| Municipal District | LEA | Definition | Seats |
|---|---|---|---|
| Metropolitan District of Limerick City | Limerick City East | Ballysimon, Ballyvarra, Castleconnell, Limerick South Rural, Roxborough; and the electoral divisions of Galvone A, Galvone B, Glentworth A, Glentworth B, Glentworth C, Rathbane, Singland B and St. Laurence as specified in the County Borough of Limerick (Wards) Regulations 1970 | 7 |
| Metropolitan District of Limerick City | Limerick City North | Limerick North Rural; and the electoral divisions of Abbey A, Abbey B, Abbey C, Abbey D, Ballynanty, Castle A, Castle B, Castle C, Castle D, Coolraine, Farranshone, Johns A, Johns B, Johns C, Killeely A, Killeely B, Market, and Singland A as specified in the County Borough of Limerick (Wards) Regulations 1970 | 7 |
| Metropolitan District of Limerick City | Limerick City West | Ballycummin, Carrig, Clarina, Patrickswell; and the electoral divisions of Ballinacurra A, Ballinacurra B, Custom House, Dock A, Dock B, Dock C, Dock D, Prospect A, Prospect B, Shannon A and Shannon B as specified in the County Borough of Limerick (Wards) Regulations 1970 | 7 |
| Adare–Rathkeale | | Abbeyville, Adare North, Adare South, Askeaton East, Askeaton West, Aughinish, Ballingarry, Ballyallinan, Ballybricken, Ballygrennan, Ballynabanoge, Ballynacarriga, Castletown (in the former Rural District of Rathkeale), Coolrus, Craggs, Crecora, Croagh, Croom, Dromard, Dunmoylan East, Dunmoylan West, Dunnaman, Fedamore, Fleanmore, Garrane, Iveruss, Kilcornan, Kildimo, Kilfinny, Kilpeacon, Kilscannell, Lismakeery, Loghill, Mohernagh, Nantinan, Pallaskenry, Rathkeale Rural, Rathkeale Urban, Rathmore, Riddlestown, Shanagolden and Shanid | 6 |
| Cappamore–Kilmallock | | Abington, Anglesborough, Ardpatrick, Athlacca, Ballylanders, Ballymacshaneboy, Bilboa, Bruff, Bruree, Bulgaden, Caherconlish East, Caherconlish West, Cahercorney, Caherelly, Cappamore, Clonkeen, Colmanswell, Crean, Cullane, Darragh, Doon South, Doon West, Dromin, Duntryleague, Emlygrennan, Galbally, Glenbrohane, Glenstal, Grange, Grean, Griston, Hospital, Kilbeheny, Kilfinnane, Kilflyn, Kilglass, Kilmallock, Kilmurry, Kilteely, Knockainy, Knocklong, Knocknascrow, Oola, Particles, Riversdale, Rockhill, Templebredon, Tobernea and Uregare | 7 |
| Newcastle West | | Abbeyfeale, Ardagh, Ballintober, Ballyagran, Ballynoe, Ballynoe West, Boola, Broadford, Caher, Castletown (in the former Rural District of Croom), Cleanglass, Cloncagh, Danganbeg, Dromcolliher, Dromtrasna, Feenagh, Garryduff, Glenagower, Glengort, Glensharrold, Glin, Kilfergus, Kilmeedy, Kilmoylan, Knockaderry, Mahoonagh, Monagay, Mountcollins, Mountplummer, Newcastle Rural, Newcastle Urban, Port, Rathronan, Rooskagh and Templeglentan | 6 |

== Councillors ==
The following were elected at the 2024 Limerick City and County Council election.

=== 2024 seats summary ===
| Party | Seats |
|---|---|
| Fine Gael | 13 |
| Fianna Fáil | 10 |
| Labour | 3 |
| Sinn Féin | 3 |
| Independent Ireland | 2 |
| Social Democrats | 2 |
| Aontú | 1 |
| Green | 1 |
| Independent | 5 |

=== Councillors by electoral area ===
This list reflects the order in which councillors were elected on 7 June 2024.

Council members from 2024 election
| Local electoral area | Name | Party |
|---|---|---|
| Adare–Rathkeale | Stephen Keary | Fine Gael |
| Adare–Rathkeale | Adam Teskey | Fine Gael |
| Adare–Rathkeale | Bridie Collins | Fianna Fáil |
| Adare–Rathkeale | John O'Donoghue | Independent Ireland |
| Adare–Rathkeale | Tommy Hartigan | Independent Ireland |
| Adare–Rathkeale | Gerald Ward | Fianna Fáil |
| Cappamore–Kilmallock | Brigid Teefy | Independent |
| Cappamore–Kilmallock | Martin Ryan | Fianna Fáil |
| Cappamore–Kilmallock | Eddie Ryan | Independent |
| Cappamore–Kilmallock | Noreen Stokes | Fine Gael |
| Cappamore–Kilmallock | Gregory Conway | Fine Gael |
| Cappamore–Kilmallock | P. J. Carey | Sinn Féin |
| Cappamore–Kilmallock | Tommy O'Sullivan | Fine Gael |
| Limerick City East | Catherine Slattery | Fianna Fáil |
| Limerick City East | Peter Doyle | Fine Gael |
| Limerick City East | Joe Pond | Fianna Fáil |
| Limerick City East | Elena Secas (Note: Changed party, see table below for details.) | Labour |
| Limerick City East | Sarah Kiely | Fine Gael |
| Limerick City East | Seán Hartigan | Green |
| Limerick City East | Ursula Gavan | Sinn Féin |
| Limerick City North | Frankie Daly | Independent |
| Limerick City North | Conor Sheehan (Note: Replaced during term, see table below for details.) | Labour |
| Limerick City North | Kieran O'Hanlon | Fianna Fáil |
| Limerick City North | Olivia O'Sullivan | Fine Gael |
| Limerick City North | Sarah Beasley | Aontú |
| Limerick City North | Sharon Benson | Sinn Féin |
| Limerick City North | Shane Hickey-O'Mara | Social Democrats |
| Limerick City West | Daniel Butler | Fine Gael |
| Limerick City West | Dan McSweeney | Fine Gael |
| Limerick City West | Joe Leddin | Labour |
| Limerick City West | Abul Kalam Azad Talukder | Fianna Fáil |
| Limerick City West | Fergus Kilcoyne | Fianna Fáil |
| Limerick City West | Maria Donoghue | Independent |
| Limerick City West | Elisa O'Donovan | Social Democrats |
| Newcastle West | Jerome Scanlan | Independent |
| Newcastle West | Liam Galvin | Fine Gael |
| Newcastle West | Michael Collins | Fianna Fáil |
| Newcastle West | John Sheahan | Fine Gael |
| Newcastle West | Tom Ruddle | Fine Gael |
| Newcastle West | Francis Foley | Fianna Fáil |

==== Co-options ====
| Party | Outgoing | LEA | Reason | Date | Co-optee |
|---|---|---|---|---|---|
| Labour | Conor Sheehan | Limerick City North | Elected to 34th Dáil at the 2024 general election | 19 December 2024 | Pádraigh Reale |

==== Changes in affiliation ====
| Name | LEA | Elected as | New affiliation | Date |
|---|---|---|---|---|
| Ursula Gavan | Limerick City East | Sinn Féin | Independent | January 2025 |
| Elena Secas | Limerick City East | Labour | Independent | October 2025 |
