= Limerick Post =

Irish newspaper

- Type: Free weekly
- Format: Tabloid
- Owner: Carnbeg Ltd
- Publisher: William Ryan
- Editor: Adam Leahy
- Founded: 1986
- Language: English
- Headquarters: Limerick, Ireland
- Circulation: 42,500 (Dec 2021)
- Website: www.limerickpost.ie

The Limerick Post is a free weekly newspaper, distributed throughout Limerick city and county, parts of counties Clare, Tipperary in the province of Munster, Ireland.

The Limerick Post was established in 1986 and remains the only locally owned newspaper in Limerick. The Post is published each Thursday morning. It recently modernised its website, with more content including video, polls and a new Digital Edition. Its main competitors are the Limerick Leader. On Saturday 24 January 2009, the Limerick Post won the coveted title of Best Free newspaper in the Midwest region, at the Mid West Arts Media and Culture Awards held at the Radisson SAS Hotel.

The publication is distributed door to door to 12,500 homes and businesses in the city and 30,000 are available in shops throughout the city and county.

On Friday 14 May 2010, it launched an iPhone app, being the first newspaper in Limerick to do so, as well as the first regional newspaper in Ireland.
