= City Hall, Limerick =

Municipal building in Limerick, Ireland

- Halla na Cathrach, Luimneach
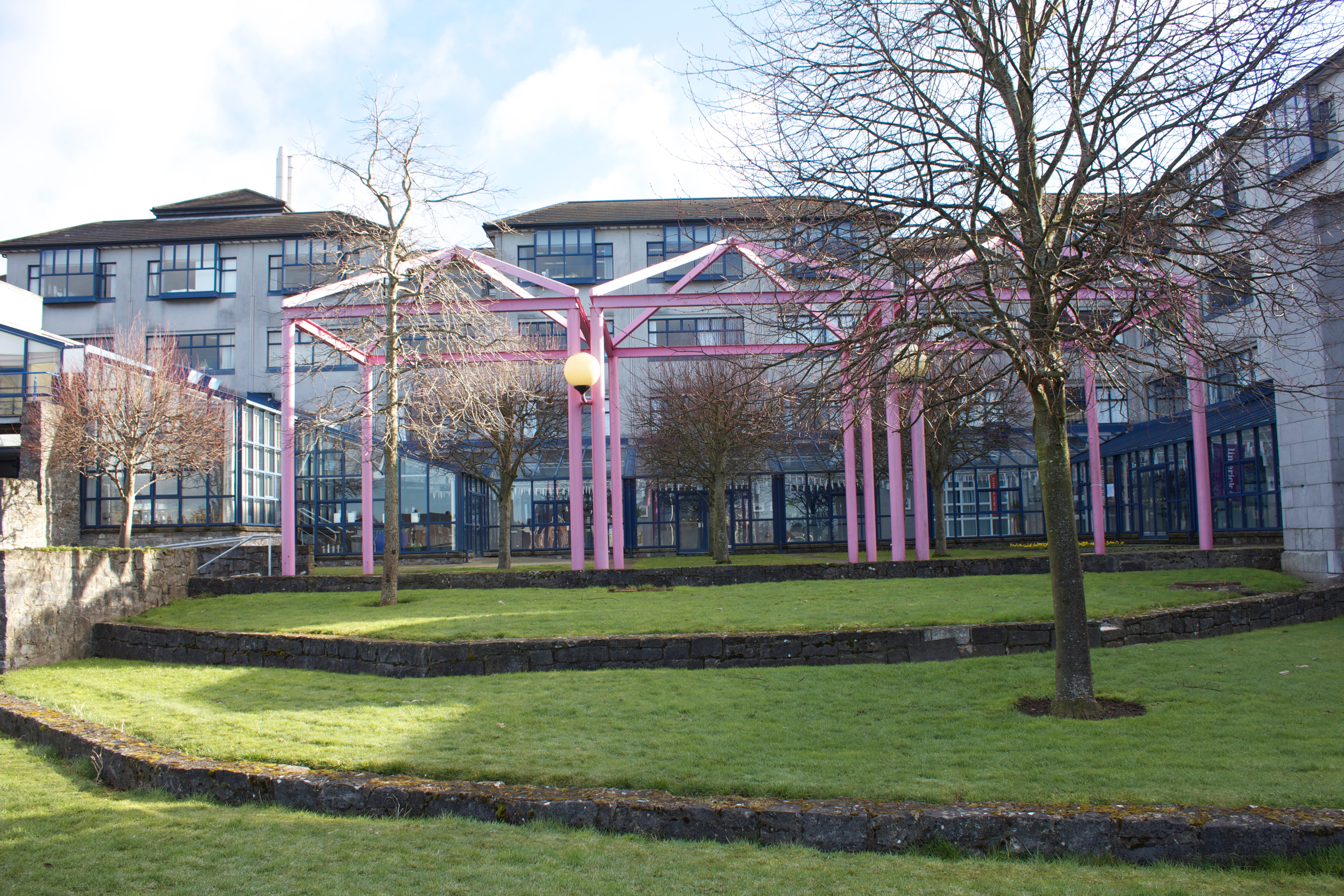
- City Hall, Limerick

- Location within Ireland

General information
- Architectural style: Modern style
- Location: Merchant's Quay, Limerick, Ireland
- Coordinates: 52.6685°N 8.6247°W
- Completed: 1990

Design and construction
- Architect: Burke-Kennedy Doyle

City Hall (Irish: Halla na Cathrach, Luimneach) is a municipal facility at Merchant's Quay, Limerick, Ireland. It is the administrative centre of Limerick City and County Council.

== History ==
City Hall was commissioned to replace the Commercial Buildings in Patrick Street which dated from 1805 and had served as the town hall from 1847. In the mid-1980s, the council leaders at Limerick Corporation decided that the council needed larger premises; the site they selected at Merchant's Quay had been occupied by an old jail which dated from 1789. The complex had ceased to be used for custodial purposes in the 19th century and had served as Geary's Biscuit Factory since the 1920s. Most of the old buildings were demolished in 1988, although the surviving façade of the old jail, designed by John Nash, was retained as part of the new development.

The new building was designed by the Dublin-based firm Burke-Kennedy Doyle in the Modern style, built in stone blocks. It was completed in 1990. The design involved an asymmetric main frontage facing onto the banks of the River Shannon. The complex featured a series of connected pavilions up to three storeys high.

A fountain entitled the "Fountain of Heritage", incorporating a sculpture of wild geese by the American sculptor William H. Turner, was paid for by the people of Spokane, Washington, and installed on the Riverside Walk outside City Hall in 1991. The sculpture was intended to commemorate local families that were forced to flee the city to France in the "Flight of the Wild Geese" following the Siege of Limerick and the defeat of the Irish Jacobite army under the command of Patrick Sarsfield in 1691.

In January 2018, a book of condolence was opened at City Hall, following the death of locally born singer Dolores O'Riordan.
