= Conor Sheehan =

Irish politician (born 1993)

Conor Sheehan TD
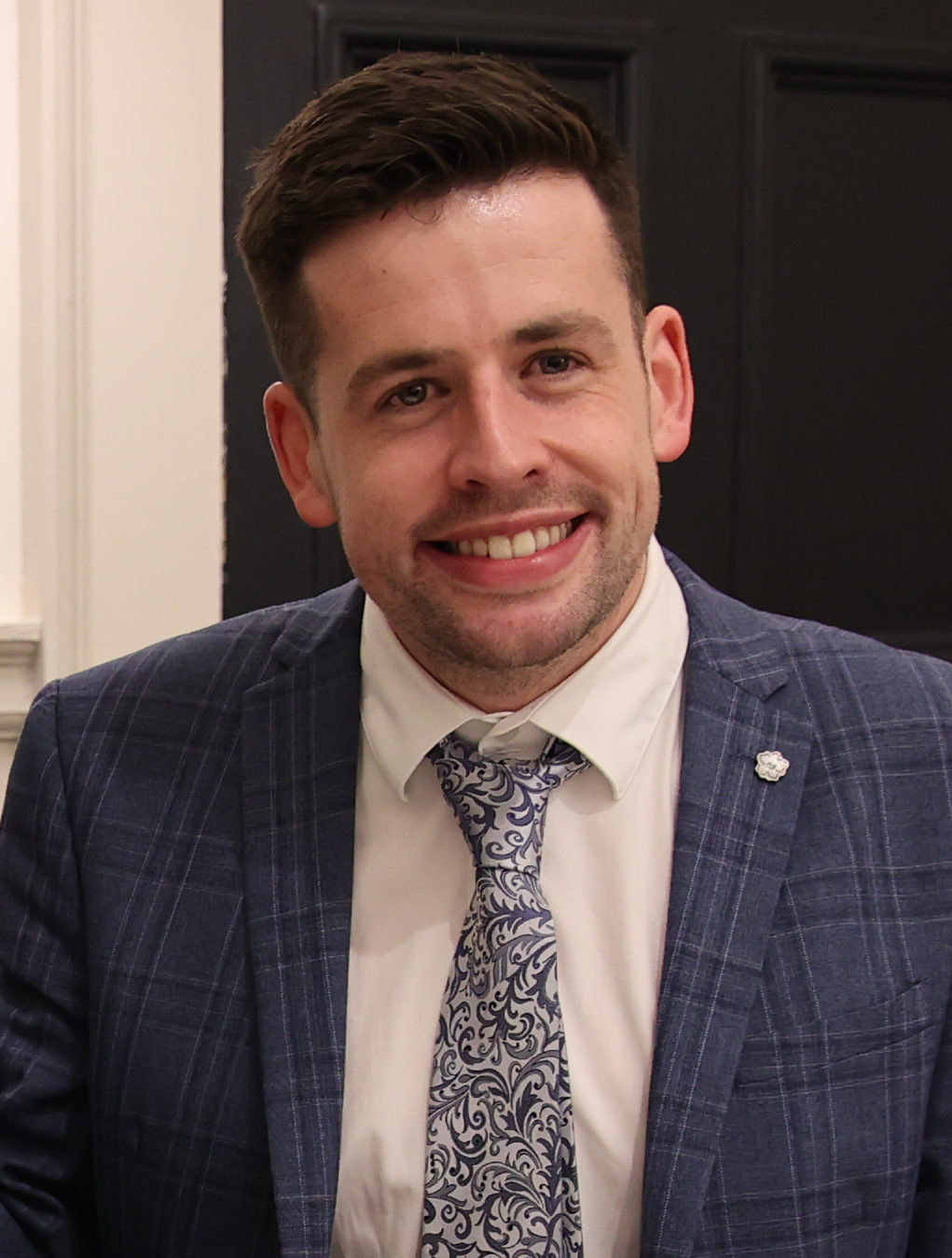
- Sheehan in 2024

Teachta Dála
- Incumbent
- Assumed office November 2024
- Constituency: Limerick City

Personal details
- Born: 15 June 1993 (age 33) Limerick, Ireland
- Party: Labour Party
- Education: Mary Immaculate College; Dublin City University

Conor Sheehan (born 15 June 1993) is an Irish Labour Party politician who has been a Teachta Dála (TD) for the Limerick City constituency since the 2024 general election.

== Biography ==
Sheehan was born and raised on the north side of Limerick and attended Mary Immaculate College. He also has a degree in journalism from Dublin City University.

Sheehan was first elected to Limerick City and County Council representing the City North area in 2019, and was re-elected in 2024. Sheehan is gay, and has spoken about receiving homophobic abuse during his time as a councillor.

He was a candidate at the 2024 Limerick mayoral election.

Dáil	Election	Deputy (Party)	Deputy (Party)	Deputy (Party)	Deputy (Party)
31st	2011	Jan O'Sullivan (Lab)	Willie O'Dea (FF)	Kieran O'Donnell (FG)	Michael Noonan (FG)
32nd	2016	Jan O'Sullivan (Lab)	Willie O'Dea (FF)	Maurice Quinlivan (SF)	Michael Noonan (FG)
33rd	2020	Brian Leddin (GP)	Willie O'Dea (FF)	Maurice Quinlivan (SF)	Kieran O'Donnell (FG)
34th	2024	Conor Sheehan (Lab)	Willie O'Dea (FF)	Maurice Quinlivan (SF)	Kieran O'Donnell (FG)
