= 2019 Limerick City and County Council election =

Part of the 2019 Irish local elections

- 24 May 2019

All 40 seats on Limerick City and County Council 21 seats needed for a majority
	First party	Second party	Third party
Party	Fine Gael	Fianna Fáil	Labour
Seats won	14	12	3
Seat change	▲2	▼1	Steady
	Fourth party	Fifth party	Sixth party
Party	Sinn Féin	Green	Social Democrats
Seats won	2	2	1
Seat change	▼4	▲2	▲1
	Seventh party
Party	Independent
Seats won	6
Seat change	▲3
- Results by local electoral area

An election to all 40 seats on Limerick City and County Council was held on 24 May 2019 as part of the 2019 Irish local elections. Limerick City and County was divided into 6 local electoral areas (LEAs) to elect 40 councillors for a five-year term of office on the electoral system of proportional representation by means of the single transferable vote (PR-STV).

The election was held alongside a plebiscite under the Local Government Act 2019 on whether or not Limerick City and County would establish the position of a directly elected mayor for the council. The proposition was approved by 52.4% to 47.6%. It was one of three areas to hold such a plebiscite, and the only one where the proposition passed. It was implemented by the Local Government (Mayor of Limerick) and Miscellaneous Provisions Act 2024.

== Boundary review ==
Following the recommendations of the 2018 boundary review committee, significant changes were made to the LEAs in the 2014 elections due to terms of references requiring a maximum of seven councillors in each LEA and changes in population revealed in the 2016 census.

== Overview ==
The 40 members included 16 new councillors, and one returning member who been defeated in 2014. 23 of the outgoing 33 councillors who stood for re-election were returned. The total of 8 women was unchanged from 2014, but 6 of those women were first-time councilors.

== Results by party ==
Party	Seats	±	1st pref	FPv%	±%
Fine Gael	14	▲2	25,168	34.19	▲1.49
Fianna Fáil	12	▼1	19,567	26.58	▼0.82
Labour	3	Steady	2,945	4.00	▼2.60
Sinn Féin	2	▼4	4,400	5.98	▼6.92
Green	2	▲2	3,639	4.94	▲4.94
Social Democrats	1	▲1	2,065	2.81	New
Aontú	0	Steady	2,136	2.90	New
Solidarity	0	▼3	1,160	1.58	▼2.82
Renua	0	Steady	211	0.29	New
Direct Democracy	0	Steady	149	0.20	New
Independent	6	▲3	12,172	16.54	▲0.64
Total	40	Steady	73,612	100.00	

== Results by local electoral area ==
*: Outgoing councillor elected in 2014.
†: Outgoing councillor coopted subsequent to the 2014 election.

=== Adare–Rathkeale ===
Adare–Rathkeale: 6 seats
Party	Candidate	FPv%	Count						
Party	Candidate	FPv%	1	2	3	4	5	6	7
Fine Gael	Adam Teskey	19.80%	2,459						
Fine Gael	Stephen Keary	16.76%	2,082						
Independent	Richard O'Donoghue (Note: See change below.)	14.10%	1,751	1,888					
Independent	Emmett O'Brien	12.61%	1,566	1,672	1,742	1,763	1,939		
Fianna Fáil	Kevin Sheahan	10.03%	1,246	1,355	1,400	1,416	1,473	1,592	1,611
Fianna Fáil	Bridie Collins	7.94%	986	1,071	1,122	1,136	1,234	1,588	1,627
Fine Gael	Leo Walsh	7.09%	880	1,053	1,160	1,175	1,292	1,436	1,458
Fianna Fáil	Trina O'Dea	6.14%	762	788	801	809	879		
Green	Theresa Storey	4.33%	538	573	590	597			
Direct Democracy	Mark Keogh	0.94%	117	129	133	136			
Direct Democracy	Mike Putt	0.26%	32	33	33	35			
Electorate: 23,675 Valid: 12,419 Spoilt: 184 Quota: 1,775 Turnout: 12,603 (53.23%)

=== Cappamore–Kilmallock ===
Cappamore–Kilmallock: 7 seats
Party	Candidate	FPv%	Count								
Party	Candidate	FPv%	1	2	3	4	5	6	7	8	9
Independent	Brigid Teefy	15.88%	2,420								
Fianna Fáil	Martin Ryan	14.16%	2,157								
Fianna Fáil	Eddie Ryan	11.96%	1,822	1,882	1,923						
Fine Gael	Gerald Mitchell	8.57%	1,306	1,414	1,427	1,500	1,566	1,599	1,754	2,017	
Fine Gael	John Egan	7.98%	1,216	1,289	1,354	1,387	1,462	1,482	1,519	1,685	1,721
Fine Gael	Greg Conway	6.90%	1,052	1,066	1,070	1,099	1,103	1,186	1,241		
Fianna Fáil	Michael Donegan	6.14%	935	958	970	1,012	1,138	1,232	1,301	1,546	1,558
Fine Gael	Noreen Stokes	5.51%	840	924	974	1,022	1,211	1,251	1,351	1,474	1,525
Sinn Féin	Jim Hickey	5.27%	803	826	834	906	946	1,039			
Independent	P.J. Carey	5.10%	777	811	817	921	939	1,196	1,412	1,683	1,696
Social Democrats	Trevor McCarthy	4.54%	692	716	721	767	776				
Fianna Fáil	Joseph Meagher	4.11%	627	656	697	723					
Aontú	Shane Hogan	3.18%	484	517	523						
Independent	John O'Gorman	0.70%	106	116	117						
Electorate: 28,363 Valid: 15,237 Spoilt: 268 Quota: 1,905 Turnout: 15,505 (54.67%)

=== Limerick City East ===
Limerick City East: 7 seats
Party	Candidate	FPv%	Count										
Party	Candidate	FPv%	1	2	3	4	5	6	7	8	9	10	11
Fianna Fáil	Catherine Slattery	10.76%	1,188	1,203	1,227	1,273	1,294	1,333	1,337	1,342	1,346	1,482	
Labour	Elena Secas	10.53%	1,162	1,167	1,180	1,193	1,314	1,346	1,358	1,488			
Fine Gael	Michael Murphy	10.48%	1,157	1,157	1,161	1,163	1,176	1,188	1,193	1,324	1,333	1,386	
Green	Seán Hartigan	9.91%	1,094	1,097	1,131	1,173	1,361	1,497					
Fianna Fáil	Joe Pond	7.58%	837	838	846	851	865	888	892	956	970	1,030	1,037
Fine Gael	Michael Sheahan	7.35%	811	812	815	822	838	846	846	1,012	1,049	1,129	1,137
Fianna Fáil	Jerry O'Dea	7.27%	803	818	849	862	882	919	920	961	966	1,074	1,099
Fine Gael	Sarah Kiely	7.15%	789	812	845	871	917	969	976	1,112	1,136	1,290	1,329
Aontú	Michael Ryan	6.54%	722	737	757	795	812	892	917	935	939		
Fine Gael	Marian Hurley	6.22%	687	688	693	695	720	727	729				
Social Democrats	Sarah Jane Hennelly	4.68%	517	521	537	599							
Sinn Féin	Séighin Ó Ceallaigh	4.67%	515	525	543	613	661						
Solidarity	Paul Keller	3.08%	340	348	392								
Independent	Noel Hannan	2.47%	273	293									
Independent	Derek Mulcahy	1.06%	117										
Independent	Diarmuid Ryan	0.24%	26										
Electorate: 25,953 Valid: 11,038 Spoilt: 257 Quota: 1,380 Turnout: 11,295 (43.52%)

=== Limerick City North ===
Limerick City North: 7 seats
Party	Candidate	FPv%	Count																	
Party	Candidate	FPv%	1	2	3	4	5	6	7	8	9	10	11	12	13	14	15	16	17	18
Independent	Frankie Daly	15.76%	1,861																	
Green	Brian Leddin	11.83%	1,397	1,427	1,442	1,503														
Fianna Fáil	Kieran O'Hanlon	10.40%	1,228	1,254	1,258	1,264	1,266	1,279	1,286	1,305	1,343	1,354	1,426	1,571						
Fine Gael	Olivia O'Sullivan	7.45%	880	908	914	931	936	983	1,007	1,017	1,035	1,075	1,081	1,105	1,200	1,232	1,242	1,621		
Sinn Féin	John Costelloe	6.36%	751	790	792	796	799	800	816	863	872	882	982	996	1,060	1,130	1,131	1,139	1,142	1,270
Fianna Fáil	Pat O'Neill	5.45%	644	659	664	670	671	676	682	697	719	727	728	761	784	792	850	915	954	975
Labour	Conor Sheehan	4.93%	582	608	611	613	615	637	674	688	709	838	864	915	952	1,019	1,041	1,096	1,180	1,273
Sinn Féin	Sharon Benson	4.83%	570	595	597	610	610	611	622	636	640	651	742	754	771	855	856	874	880	1,041
Fine Gael	Eleanor McSherry	3.87%	457	462	473	489	494	563	570	579	594	636	637	648	698	718	719			
Independent	Dean Quinn	3.79%	448	508	510	523	524	524	547	597	642	646	658	664	689	767	768	782	794	
Solidarity	Mary Cahillane	3.14%	371	386	388	401	401	406	455	466	484	508	523	544	564					
Sinn Féin	John Nugent	2.90%	342	353	353	355	355	362	374	377	379	381								
Fine Gael	Brian O'Connor	2.68%	317	326	326	329	329	359	362	393	400	418	424	443						
Fianna Fáil	Christy McInerney	2.68%	316	331	331	333	333	362	368	379	398	409	411							
Labour	Anne Cronin	2.39%	282	289	292	300	300	305	347	354	360									
Aontú	Maeve O'Donnell	2.35%	278	284	288	307	310	316	320	329										
Social Democrats	Kieran Walsh	2.30%	272	285	287	289	290	299												
Fine Gael	Denis McCarthy	2.20%	260	270	273	283	286													
Independent	Kevin Kiely	2.13%	252	273	279	294	296	307	312											
Independent	Ruth Clarke	1.52%	180	189	249															
Independent	Des Hayes	1.05%	124	138																
Electorate: 26,436 Valid: 11,812 Spoilt: 294 Quota: 1,477 Turnout: 12,106 (45.79%)

=== Limerick City West ===
Limerick City West: 7 seats
Party	Candidate	FPv%	Count													
Party	Candidate	FPv%	1	2	3	4	5	6	7	8	9	10	11	12	13	14
Fianna Fáil	James Collins	12.99%	1,375													
Fine Gael	Daniel Butler	12.43%	1,316	1,326												
Labour	Joe Leddin	8.68%	919	924	935	936	958	968	1,001	1,038	1,082	1,117	1,159	1,237	1,440	
Independent	Fergus Kilcoyne	7.08%	750	753	755	755	768	783	792	810	866	894	1,054	1,120	1,173	1,186
Fianna Fáil	Abul Kalam Azad Talukder	6.58%	697	701	703	703	707	717	760	763	780	796	913	953	981	990
Fine Gael	Elenora Hogan	6.43%	681	685	691	692	700	707	712	739	780	795	825	853		
Fine Gael	Dan McSweeney	6.03%	638	640	648	648	653	676	681	698	718	730	832	866	1,151	1,200
Green	Breandán Anraoi Macgabhann	5.76%	610	612	628	628	637	651	656	681	723	776	809	883	936	965
Fianna Fáil	Sean Lynch	5.58%	591	605	607	607	614	628	631	649	685	700				
Social Democrats	Elisa O'Donovan	5.52%	584	585	599	599	612	624	632	646	676	910	940	1,081	1,155	1,171
Sinn Féin	Malachy McCreesh	5.27%	558	559	574	574	590	608	615	644	664	720	743			
Solidarity	Seónaidh Ní Shíomóin	4.24%	449	451	480	480	483	510	517	544	567					
Aontú	Julian Fitzgibbon	3.75%	397	398	404	404	427	434	445	457						
Independent	Jim Long	2.69%	285	286	295	295	305	321	323							
Independent	Sunnymartins Duruagwu	2.04%	216	216	224	224	230	238								
Independent	Cathal McCarthy	1.81%	192	192	200	200										
Independent	Jamie Morrissey	1.80%	191	192	201	201	210									
Independent	Mark Carey	0.89%	94	94												
Independent	John Loftus	0.42%	44	44												
Electorate: 23,374 Valid: 10,587 Spoilt: 214 Quota: 1,324 Turnout: 10,801 (46.21%)

=== Newcastle West ===
Newcastle West: 6 seats
Party	Candidate	FPv%	Count					
Party	Candidate	FPv%	1	2	3	4	5	6
Fine Gael	Jerome Scanlan	20.07%	2,512					
Fianna Fáil	Michael Collins	17.52%	2,193					
Fine Gael	Liam Galvin	16.97%	2,124					
Fine Gael	John Sheahan	12.01%	1,503	1,623	1,656	1,750	1,796	
Fine Gael	Tom Ruddle	9.59%	1,201	1,493	1,578	1,613	1,635	1,808
Fianna Fáil	Francis Foley	9.27%	1,160	1,288	1,494	1,620	1,656	1,844
Sinn Féin	Séamus Browne	6.88%	861	941	973	1,015	1,038	1,206
Independent	Christy Kelly	3.81%	477	524	544	569	607	
Aontú	Conor O'Donoghue	2.04%	255	291	309	316	383	
Renua	John Dalton	1.69%	211	226	235	240		
Independent	Sean O'Mahony	0.18%	22	27	28	29		
Electorate: 22,827 Valid: 12,519 Spoilt: 195 Quota: 1,789 Turnout: 12,714 (55.7%)

== Results by gender ==
2019 Limerick City and County Council election Candidates by gender
Gender	Number of candidates	% of candidates	Elected councillors	% of councillors
Men	72	78.3%	32	80.0%
Women	20	21.7%	8	20.0%
TOTAL	92		40	

== Plebiscite ==
2019 Limerick City and Council mayoral plebiscite
Choice	Votes	%
For	38,122	52.44
Against	34,578	47.56
Total	72,700	100.00
Valid votes	72,695	97.36
Invalid/blank votes	1,975	2.64
Total votes	74,670	100.00
Registered voters/turnout	150,628	49.57

== Changes ==
=== Co-options ===
Party	Outgoing	LEA	Reason	Date	Co-optee
Green	Brian Leddin	Limerick City North	Elected to the 33rd Dáil for Limerick City at the 2020 general election	25 February 2020	Saša Novak Uí Chonchúir
Independent	Richard O'Donoghue	Adare–Rathkeale	Elected to the 33rd Dáil for Limerick County at the 2020 general election	25 February 2020	John O'Donoghue
Sinn Féin	John Costelloe	Limerick City North	Stepping down from politics.	May 2022	Tom Collopy
Fianna Fáil	Jerry O'Dea	Limerick City East	Death of councillor	July 2022	Joe Pond

=== Changes in affiliation ===
Name	LEA	Elected as	New affiliation	Date
Jerome Scanlan	Newcastle West	Fine Gael	Independent	November 2019
Eddie Ryan	Cappamore–Kilmallock	Fianna Fáil	Independent	23 June 2020
Elisa O'Donovan	Limerick City West	Social Democrats	Independent	June 2020
Elisa O'Donovan	Limerick City West	Independent	Social Democrats	December 2021
P.J. Carey	Cappamore–Kilmallock	Independent	Sinn Féin	January 2022
Fergus Kilcoyne	Limerick City West	Independent	Fianna Fáil	January 2024
John O'Donoghue	Adare–Rathkeale	Independent	Independent Ireland	March 2024

== Sources ==
- "Limerick City and County Council - Local Election candidates". RTÉ. 14 May 2019. Archived from the original on 6 June 2019.
- "Local Election Results 2019". Limerick City and County Council.
- "Local Elections 2019: Results, Transfer of Votes and Statistics" (PDF). Department of Housing, Planning and Local Government (DHPLG). pp. 48–58. Archived from the original (PDF) on 10 June 2020.
