= John Moran (mayor of Limerick) =

Irish politician

Mayor of Limerick
- Incumbent
- Assumed office 21 June 2024

Personal details
- Born: 1965/1966 (age 60–61) Birmingham, England
- Party: Independent
- Education: CBS Sexton Street
- Alma mater: University College Dublin; University of Pennsylvania
- Website: johnmoran.ie

John Moran (born 1965/1966) is an Irish politician who was elected as the Mayor of Limerick, following the 2024 Limerick mayoral election. He was inaugurated on 21 June 2024.

== Early life ==
Born in Birmingham, Moran was raised on his family's farm in Patrickswell, County Limerick and later in Dooradoyle. He attended St Paul's national school in Dooradoyle, and CBS Sexton Street in Limerick.

He obtained a law degree at University College Dublin, followed by a master's from the Wharton School at the University of Pennsylvania.

== Career ==
Following his master's degree, Moran passed the New York state bar and worked as a lawyer on Wall Street for three years. He returned to Ireland in 1990 to attain an Irish law qualification, before returning to the United States to run the New York office of McCann Fitzgerald. He later worked as an investment banker with Zurich Financial Services. In 2004, Moran moved to Paris and set up a juice bar there.

He was the secretary-general of the Department of Finance from 2012 to 2014, having been appointed by finance minister Michael Noonan.

=== Controversies ===
It was reported that Moran was involved in the international Uber leaks scandal in 2022 when official lobbying register shows RHH International - the consultancy owned by former Department of Finance secretary general John Moran - did not declare contacts with former ministers Michael Noonan and Frances Fitzgerald, and senior civil servant Graham Doyle concerning Uber business. Moran was paid €10,000 by Uber to lobby government ministers to change Irish taxi regulations so it could enter the market.

=== Mayor of Limerick ===
On 27 February 2024, Moran announced that he would stand as an independent candidate for the 2024 Limerick mayoral election, the first directly-elected head of local government in Ireland. He launched his campaign at a hotel in Newcastle West on 8 April. The election took place on 7 June. Moran received 22.9% of first-preference votes and was elected on the 12th count. He was inaugurated at a ceremony at Limerick's oldest building, St Mary's Cathedral, on 21 June 2024.

There have reportedly been differences between Moran, and Pat Daly (the council's Director General) and Fórsa (the public services trade union) on introducing change. Also, in February 2026, Moran alleged that a group of Fianna Fáil and Fine Gael councillors were undermining him.

== Personal life ==
He is a gay man, and has a partner named Damien.

In 2022, Moran revealed to Matt Cooper in a radio interview that he had bowel cancer.
