= Kieran O'Donnell =

Irish politician (born 1963)

Kieran O'Donnell TD
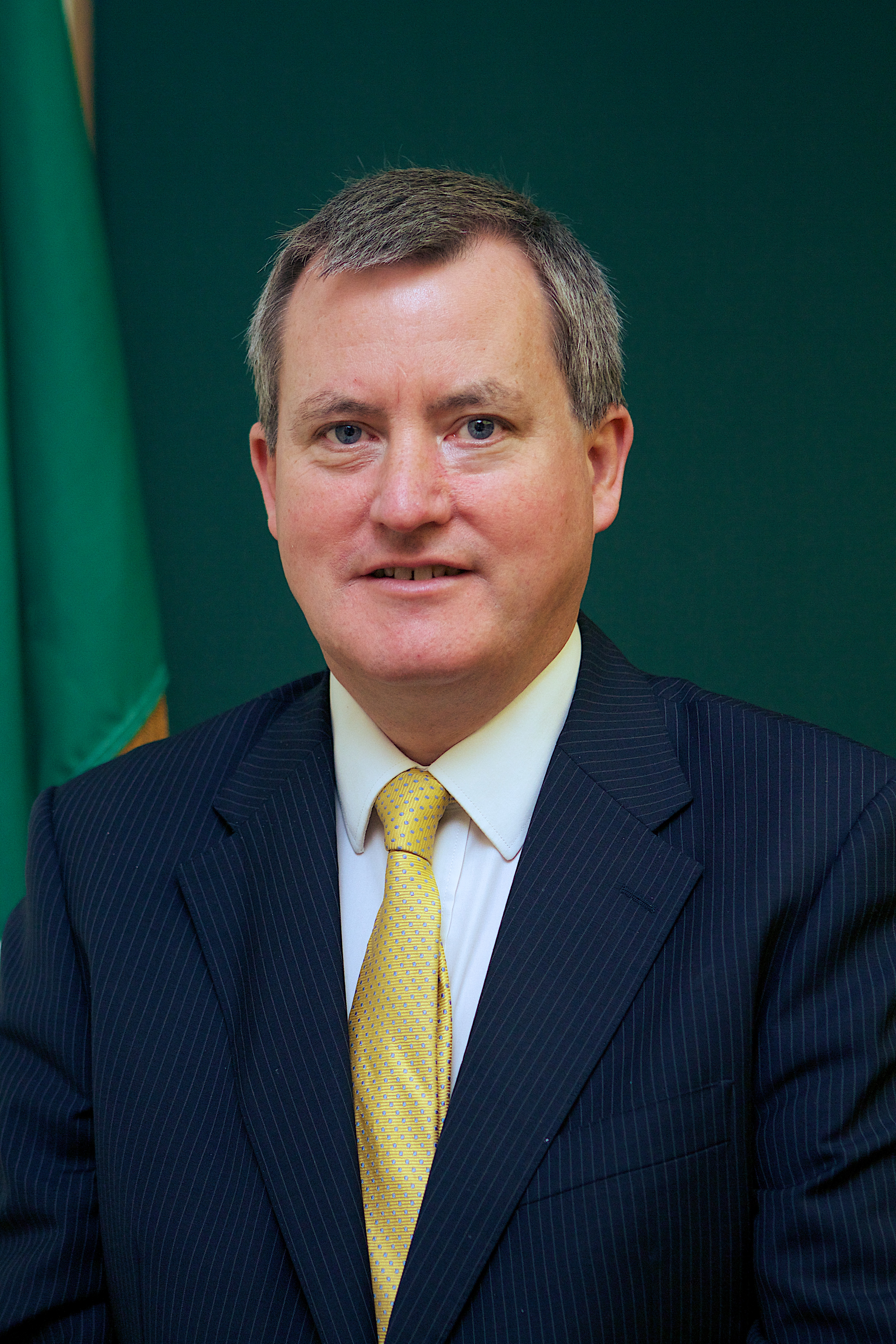
- O'Donnell in 2014

Minister of State
- 2025–: Housing, Local Government and Heritage
- 2025–: Health
- 2024–2025: Public Expenditure, NDP Delivery and Reform
- 2022–2024: Housing, Local Government and Heritage

Chair of the Committee on Transport and Communications Networks
- In office 15 September 2020 – 8 November 2024
- Preceded by: New office
- Succeeded by: TBA

Teachta Dála
- Incumbent
- Assumed office February 2020
- In office February 2011 – February 2016
- Constituency: Limerick City
- In office May 2007 – February 2011
- Constituency: Limerick East

Senator
- In office 8 June 2016 – 8 February 2020
- Constituency: Cultural and Educational Panel

Personal details
- Born: 8 May 1963 (age 63) Limerick, Ireland
- Party: Fine Gael
- Spouse: Phil O'Donnell (m. 1993)
- Children: 4
- Relatives: Tom O'Donnell (uncle)
- Education: University of Limerick
- Website: kieranodonnell.ie

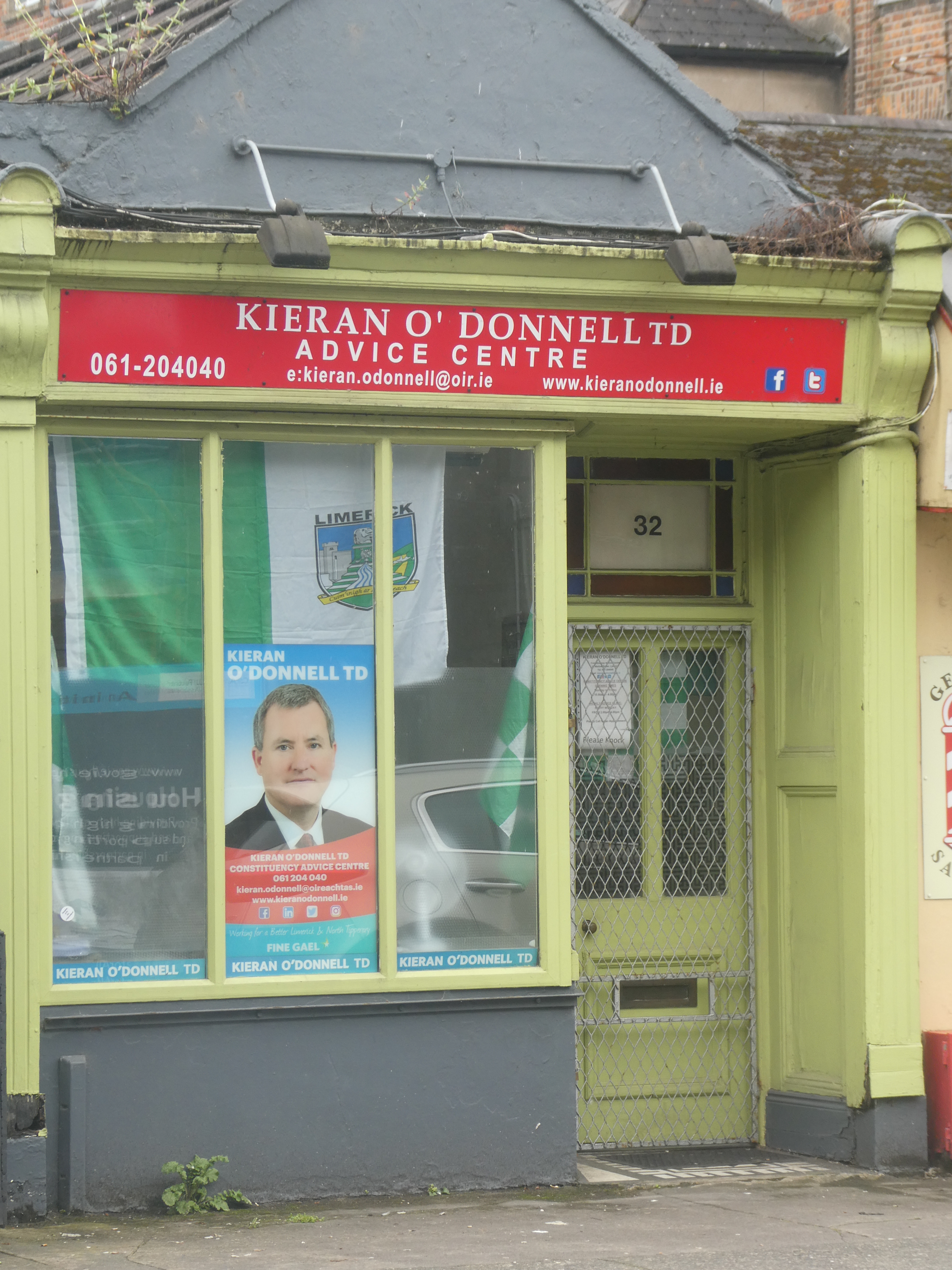
Constituency office in Limerick

Kieran O'Donnell (born 8 May 1963) is an Irish Fine Gael politician who has served as a Minister of State since December 2022. He has been a Teachta Dála (TD) for the Limerick City constituency since the 2020 general election, and previously from 2011 to 2016 and from 2007 to 2011 for the Limerick East constituency. He was appointed Chair of the Committee on Transport and Communications Networks in September 2020. He was a Senator for the Cultural and Educational Panel from 2016 to 2020.

Before becoming a full-time public representative, O'Donnell worked as an accountant. He is a nephew of Tom O'Donnell, a former Minister and TD for Limerick East.

O'Donnell was an unsuccessful candidate at the 2002 Seanad election. He was elected on his first attempt to Limerick County Council for the Castleconnell local electoral area in 2004. He was first elected to Dáil Éireann at the 2007 general election.

In October 2007, O'Donnell was appointed party Deputy Spokesperson on Finance, with special responsibility for Freedom of Information, Procurement Reform and the Office of Public Works. As Deputy Spokesperson, O'Donnell was given the full Finance portfolio on an acting basis by Enda Kenny on 14 June 2010, when Kenny sacked Richard Bruton. O'Donnell subsequently supported Richard Bruton's leadership challenge to Enda Kenny. Following Kenny's victory in a motion of confidence, O'Donnell was not appointed to the front bench. In October 2010, he was appointed as party Deputy Spokesperson on Enterprise, Trade and Innovation, with special responsibility for Enterprise and Employment.

He lost his Dáil seat at the 2016 general election. He was subsequently elected to the 25th Seanad for the Cultural and Educational Panel, where he served as the Fine Gael Seanad Spokesperson on Finance. He regained his Dáil seat following the 2020 general election.

In December 2022, O'Donnell was appointed as Minister of State at the Department of Housing, Local Government and Heritage with special responsibility for Local Government and Planning following the appointment of Leo Varadkar as Taoiseach.

On 10 April 2024, O'Donnell was appointed as Minister of State at the Department of Public Expenditure, NDP Delivery and Reform following the appointment of Simon Harris as Taoiseach.

On 29 January 2025, he was appointed as Minister of State at the Department of Health with special responsibility for Older People and Minister of State at the Department of Housing, Local Government and Heritage with responsibility for Housing.

== See also ==
- Families in the Oireachtas

Political offices
Preceded by Peter Burke	Minister of State at the Department of Housing, Local Government and Heritage; 2022–2024	Succeeded by Alan Dillon
Preceded by Patrick O'Donovan	Minister of State at the Department of Public Expenditure, NDP Delivery and Reform; 2024–2025	Succeeded by Kevin "Boxer" Moran
Preceded by Mary Butler	Minister of State at the Department of Health; 2025–present	Incumbent
New office	Minister of State at the Department of Housing, Local Government and Heritage; 2025–present	Incumbent

Dáil	Election	Deputy (Party)	Deputy (Party)	Deputy (Party)	Deputy (Party)	Deputy (Party)
13th	1948	Michael Keyes (Lab)	Robert Ryan (FF)	James Reidy (FG)	Daniel Bourke (FF)	4 seats 1948–1981
14th	1951	Michael Keyes (Lab)	Tadhg Crowley (FF)	James Reidy (FG)	Daniel Bourke (FF)	4 seats 1948–1981
14th	1952 by-election	Michael Keyes (Lab)	Tadhg Crowley (FF)	James Reidy (FG)	John Carew (FG)	4 seats 1948–1981
15th	1954	Michael Keyes (Lab)	Tadhg Crowley (FF)	Donogh O'Malley (FF)	John Carew (FG)	4 seats 1948–1981
16th	1957	Ted Russell (Ind.)	Paddy Clohessy (FF)	Donogh O'Malley (FF)	John Carew (FG)	4 seats 1948–1981
17th	1961	Stephen Coughlan (Lab)	Paddy Clohessy (FF)	Donogh O'Malley (FF)	Tom O'Donnell (FG)	4 seats 1948–1981
18th	1965	Stephen Coughlan (Lab)	Paddy Clohessy (FF)	Donogh O'Malley (FF)	Tom O'Donnell (FG)	4 seats 1948–1981
18th	1968 by-election	Stephen Coughlan (Lab)	Paddy Clohessy (FF)	Desmond O'Malley (FF)	Tom O'Donnell (FG)	4 seats 1948–1981
19th	1969	Stephen Coughlan (Lab)	Michael Herbert (FF)	Desmond O'Malley (FF)	Tom O'Donnell (FG)	4 seats 1948–1981
20th	1973	Stephen Coughlan (Lab)	Michael Herbert (FF)	Desmond O'Malley (FF)	Tom O'Donnell (FG)	4 seats 1948–1981
21st	1977	Michael Lipper (Ind.)	Michael Herbert (FF)	Desmond O'Malley (FF)	Tom O'Donnell (FG)	4 seats 1948–1981
22nd	1981	Jim Kemmy (Ind.)	Peadar Clohessy (FF)	Desmond O'Malley (FF)	Tom O'Donnell (FG)	Michael Noonan (FG)
23rd	1982 (Feb)	Jim Kemmy (DSP)	Willie O'Dea (FF)	Desmond O'Malley (FF)	Tom O'Donnell (FG)	Michael Noonan (FG)
24th	1982 (Nov)	Frank Prendergast (Lab)	Willie O'Dea (FF)	Desmond O'Malley (FF)	Tom O'Donnell (FG)	Michael Noonan (FG)
25th	1987	Jim Kemmy (DSP)	Willie O'Dea (FF)	Desmond O'Malley (PDs)	Peadar Clohessy (PDs)	Michael Noonan (FG)
26th	1989	Jim Kemmy (DSP)	Willie O'Dea (FF)	Desmond O'Malley (PDs)	Peadar Clohessy (PDs)	Michael Noonan (FG)
27th	1992	Jim Kemmy (Lab)	Willie O'Dea (FF)	Desmond O'Malley (PDs)	Peadar Clohessy (PDs)	Michael Noonan (FG)
28th	1997	Jim Kemmy (Lab)	Willie O'Dea (FF)	Desmond O'Malley (PDs)	Eddie Wade (FF)	Michael Noonan (FG)
28th	1998 by-election	Jan O'Sullivan (Lab)	Willie O'Dea (FF)	Desmond O'Malley (PDs)	Eddie Wade (FF)	Michael Noonan (FG)
29th	2002	Jan O'Sullivan (Lab)	Willie O'Dea (FF)	Tim O'Malley (PDs)	Peter Power (FF)	Michael Noonan (FG)
30th	2007	Jan O'Sullivan (Lab)	Willie O'Dea (FF)	Kieran O'Donnell (FG)	Peter Power (FF)	Michael Noonan (FG)
31st	2011	Constituency abolished. See Limerick City and Limerick				

Dáil	Election	Deputy (Party)	Deputy (Party)	Deputy (Party)	Deputy (Party)
31st	2011	Jan O'Sullivan (Lab)	Willie O'Dea (FF)	Kieran O'Donnell (FG)	Michael Noonan (FG)
32nd	2016	Jan O'Sullivan (Lab)	Willie O'Dea (FF)	Maurice Quinlivan (SF)	Michael Noonan (FG)
33rd	2020	Brian Leddin (GP)	Willie O'Dea (FF)	Maurice Quinlivan (SF)	Kieran O'Donnell (FG)
34th	2024	Conor Sheehan (Lab)	Willie O'Dea (FF)	Maurice Quinlivan (SF)	Kieran O'Donnell (FG)
