= 1985 Dublin County Council election =

Part of the 1985 Irish local elections

← 1979	20 June 1985	1991 →

All 78 seats on Dublin County Council
	First party	Second party	Third party
Party	Fianna Fáil	Fine Gael	Labour
Seats won	39	26	8
Seat change	-	-
	Fourth party	Fifth party
Party	Workers' Party	Independent
Seats won	3	2
Council control after election
TBD

Under the Local Government (Reorganisation) Act 1985, there was not an election to Dublin County Council at the 1985 Irish local elections, which took place on 20 June.

Elections were held for three electoral counties established by the 1985 Act.

Electoral County	FF	FG	Lab	WP	Ind	Total	Details
Dublin–Belgard	13	8	2	2	1	26	Details
Dublin–Fingal	13	7	3		1	24	Details
Dún Laoghaire–Rathdown	13	11	3	1		28	Details
Total	39	26	8	3	2	78	

These members collectively served as the 78 members of Dublin County Council. This was an increase from the 36 members who had sat in the unified council prior to the election.
