= 1991 Limerick Corporation election =

Part of the 1991 Irish local elections

← 1985	27 June 1991	1999 →

All 17 seats on Limerick City Council
	First party	Second party	Third party
Party	Labour	Fine Gael	Progressive Democrats
Seats won	5	4	3
Seat change	+4	-2	+3
	Fourth party	Fifth party	Sixth party
Party	Fianna Fáil	Workers' Party	Independent
Seats won	2	1	2
Seat change	-3	+1	0
	Seventh party
Party	Democratic Socialist
Seats won	0
Seat change	-3
- Map showing the area of Limerick City Council
Council control after election
TBD

An election to Limerick City Council took place on 27 June 1991 as part of that year's Irish local elections. 17 councillors were elected from four local electoral areas (LEAs) for a five-year term of office on the electoral system of proportional representation by means of the single transferable vote (PR-STV). This term was extended twice, first to 1998, then to 1999.

== Results by party ==
Party	Seats	±	First Pref. votes	FPv%	±%
Labour	5	+4	4,822	22.94	
Fine Gael	4	-2	4,618	21.97	
Progressive Democrats	3	+3	2,765	13.15	
Fianna Fáil	2	-3	4,267	20.30	
Workers' Party	1	+1	751	3.57	
Independent	2	0	3,518	16.74	
Democratic Socialist	0	-3	N/A	N/A	
Totals	17	0	21,019	100.00	—

== Results by local electoral area ==
=== Limerick No.1 ===
Limerick No.1 - 4 seats
Party	Candidate	FPv%	Count							
Party	Candidate	FPv%	1	2	3	4	5	6	7	8
Fianna Fáil	Willie O'Dea TD	23%	1,104							
Independent	Tim Leddin*	17.3%	827	843	846	863	867	876	964	
Labour	Frank Prendergast*	15%	719	738	747	767	842	893	1,004	
Progressive Democrats	John Quinn*	10.9%	523	535	536	555	563	602	640	875
Progressive Democrats	Tim O'Driscoll*	10.2%	489	502	511	532	557	628	656	756
Progressive Democrats	Frank O'Mahony	7.3%	349	357	361	372	375	377	413	
Fine Gael	Mary Prendergast	6%	286	293	298	311	324	334		
Sinn Féin	Tom Clancy	4.5%	217	222	233	237	253			
Labour	Judy O'Donoghue	2.8%	134	138	153	155				
Fianna Fáil	Garrett Ryan	1.8%	87	146	147					
Workers' Party	David Lee	1.2%	58	60						
Electorate: 8,410 Valid: 4,793 (56.99%) Spoilt: 46 Quota: 959 Turnout: 4,837 (57.51%)

=== Limerick No.2 ===
Limerick No.2 - 5 seats
Party	Candidate	FPv%	Count												
Party	Candidate	FPv%	1	2	3	4	5	6	7	8	9	10	11	12	13
Independent	John Gilligan	15.4%	1,115	1,126	1,138	1,147	1,160	1,174	1,188	1,212					
Labour	Jan O'Sullivan*	12.4%	894	906	941	952	969	1,061	1,117	1,143	1,182	1,212			
Workers' Party	John Ryan	9.6%	693	699	713	716	738	745	755	772	834	854	1,085	1,087	1,089
Fine Gael	Gus O'Driscoll*	9.2%	666	672	677	711	716	726	802	825	983	1,033	1,126	1,128	1,132
Independent	Michael Crowe	8.1%	588	592	604	619	643	654	671	695	799	831			
Progressive Democrats	Kieran O'Hanlon	7.5%	539	541	545	560	567	616	800	832	851	919	1,036	1,037	1,038
Fine Gael	Kevin Kiely*	6.1%	443	443	451	474	486	488	494	507					
Fianna Fáil	Paddy Madden*	6%	436	439	441	448	489	508	517	637	676	919	1,026	1,029	1,030
Progressive Democrats	Joan Stockil	5%	364	369	371	381	389	393							
Fianna Fáil	Paddy Kiely	5%	362	362	364	375	403	408	415						
Fianna Fáil	Larry Cross*	5%	358	359	372	380	412	418	420	533	546				
Fianna Fáil	Peggy McInerney	2.9%	212	214	214	218									
Labour	Michael McMahon	2.6%	189	190	213	224	225								
Fine Gael	Ronnie Madden	2.2%	159	163	163										
Labour	Joe Bennis	1.9%	139	140											
Green	Pat O'Doherty	0.8%	61												
Electorate: 12,063 Valid: 7,218 (59.84%) Spoilt: 66 Quota: 1,204 Turnout: 7,284 (60.38%)

=== Limerick No.3 ===
Limerick No.3 - 4 seats
Party	Candidate	FPv%	Count					
Party	Candidate	FPv%	1	2	3	4	5	6
Labour	Jim Kemmy TD*	31.4%	1,418					
Independent	Joe Harrington*	20%	905					
Fianna Fáil	Jack Bourke*	12.7%	574	621	652	675	793	863
Fine Gael	Ger Fahy*	11.8%	533	699	701	707	730	740
Labour	Frank Leddin	10.2%	459	754	756	772	791	871
Independent	Billy Morgan	5.5%	249	306	315	344	382	
Fianna Fáil	Jim McMahon	4.1%	186	217	224	231		
Fine Gael	Anthony O'Neill	2.8%	125	143	156			
Fianna Fáil	Paddy O'Donovan	1.5%	66	76				
Electorate: 8,405 Valid: 4,515 (53.72%) Spoilt: 40 Quota: 904 Turnout: 4,555 (54.19%)

=== Limerick No.4 ===
Limerick No.4 - 4 seats
Party	Candidate	FPv%	Count								
Party	Candidate	FPv%	1	2	3	4	5	6	7	8	9
Fine Gael	Bobby Byrne*	19.6%	879	883	889	907					
Labour	Sean Griffin	19.4%	870	913							
Fine Gael	Senator Pat Kennedy*	15.6%	700	709	723	749	810	966			
Progressive Democrats	Dick Sadlier	11.2%	501	501	503	532	577	739	744	750	793
Fianna Fáil	John O'Connor*	10.3%	463	471	493	502	662	735	737	739	763
Independent	Win Harrington*	9.4%	421	359	408	429	458	478	519		
Fianna Fáil	Tom Brazier	7.1%	318	285	294	297	307	401			
Independent	John McGrath	3.2%	142	224	233	240	247				
Fianna Fáil	Michael Cremins	2.2%	101	155	161	170					
Independent	Noel Hannan	2.2%	98	87	95						
Electorate: 8,003 Valid: 4,493 (56.14%) Spoilt: 29 Quota: 899 Turnout: 4,522 (56.5%)
