= 2004 Limerick City Council election =

Part of the 2004 Irish local elections

- 11 June 2004

All 17 seats on Limerick City Council
| | First party | Second party | Third party |
|---|---|---|---|
| Party | Fine Gael | Labour | Fianna Fáil |
| Seats won | 5 | 4 | 2 |
| Seat change | - | +1 | -4 |
| | Fourth party |
| Party | Independent |
| Seats won | 6 |
| Seat change | +3 |
- Map showing the area of Limerick City Council
Council control after election
TBD

An election to Limerick City Council took place on 11 June 2004 as part of that year's Irish local elections. 17 councillors were elected from four local electoral areas (LEAs) for a five-year term of office on the electoral system of proportional representation by means of the single transferable vote (PR-STV).

== Results by party ==
| Party | Seats | ± | First Pref. votes | FPv% | ±% |
|---|---|---|---|---|---|
| Fine Gael | 5 | - | 5,606 | 26.58 | |
| Labour | 4 | +1 | 2,947 | 13.97 | |
| Fianna Fáil | 2 | -4 | 3,358 | 15.92 | |
| Independent | 6 | +3 | 6,322 | 29.98 | |
| Totals | 17 | - | 21,090 | 100.00 | — |

== Results by local electoral area ==
=== Limerick No.1 ===
Limerick No.1 - 5 seats
| Party | Candidate | FPv% | Count | | | | | | | | |
| Party | Candidate | FPv% | 1 | 2 | 3 | 4 | 5 | 6 | 7 | 8 | 9 |
|---|---|---|---|---|---|---|---|---|---|---|---|
| Fine Gael | Michael Hourigan* | 16.57 | 1,085 | 1,090 | 1,107 | | | | | | |
| Independent | Kathleen Leddin* | 15.90 | 1,041 | 1,055 | 1,088 | 1,093 | | | | | |
| Fine Gael | Kevin Kiely | 12.28 | 804 | 809 | 811 | 816 | 824 | 852 | 878 | 942 | 1,002 |
| Labour | John Ryan* | 10.43 | 683 | 686 | 695 | 696 | 708 | 740 | 801 | 889 | 985 |
| Fianna Fáil | John Cronin* | 8.97 | 587 | 591 | 592 | 593 | 639 | 658 | 684 | 753 | 1,088 |
| Sinn Féin | Maurice Quinlivan | 8.68 | 568 | 575 | 575 | 575 | 579 | 717 | 730 | 751 | 795 |
| Fianna Fáil | Joseph Collopy | 6.95 | 455 | 461 | 469 | 469 | 541 | 555 | 613 | 706 | |
| Progressive Democrats | Tom Frawley | 5.48 | 359 | 363 | 389 | 391 | 405 | 413 | 503 | | |
| Progressive Democrats | David O'Mahony | 4.31 | 282 | 283 | 318 | 318 | 345 | 350 | | | |
| Independent | Mick Ryan | 4.02 | 263 | 267 | 269 | 269 | 272 | | | | |
| Fianna Fáil | Michael Ryan* | 3.10 | 203 | 204 | 213 | 214 | | | | | |
| Progressive Democrats | Anne O'Keeffe | 2.29 | 150 | 151 | | | | | | | |
| Christian Solidarity | Conor O'Donoghue | 1.02 | 67 | | | | | | | | |
Electorate: 11,221 Valid: 6,547 (58.35%) Spoilt: 153 Quota: 1,092 Turnout: 6,900 (59.71%)

=== Limerick No.2 ===
Limerick No.2 - 4 seats
| Party | Candidate | FPv% | Count | | | | | | | | |
| Party | Candidate | FPv% | 1 | 2 | 3 | 4 | 5 | 6 | 7 | 8 | 9 |
|---|---|---|---|---|---|---|---|---|---|---|---|
| Independent | John Gilligan* | 17.56 | 906 | 916 | 931 | 969 | 1,002 | 1,070 | | | |
| Labour | Kieran Walsh* | 14.05 | 725 | 739 | 776 | 780 | 851 | 878 | 885 | 920 | 968 |
| Fine Gael | Catherine O'Farrell | 13.43 | 693 | 698 | 737 | 754 | 785 | 803 | 805 | 861 | 901 |
| Fianna Fáil | Kieran O'Hanlon* | 12.39 | 639 | 644 | 664 | 690 | 699 | 716 | 720 | 886 | 983 |
| Independent | Gerry McLoughlin | 11.75 | 606 | 611 | 635 | 655 | 693 | 734 | 749 | 790 | 931 |
| Independent | Noel Hannan | 7.02 | 362 | 367 | 369 | 403 | 408 | 437 | 446 | 488 | |
| Fianna Fáil | Larry Cross* | 6.90 | 356 | 358 | 371 | 375 | 389 | 402 | 403 | | |
| Sinn Féin | Nancy Irwin | 4.65 | 240 | 243 | 245 | 252 | 257 | | | | |
| Independent | Christy Vereker | 4.42 | 228 | 230 | 237 | 248 | | | | | |
| Independent | John Morrisson | 3.41 | 176 | 178 | 182 | | | | | | |
| Progressive Democrats | Stuart McDonnell | 3.24 | 167 | 170 | | | | | | | |
| Green | Duncan Martin | 1.18 | 61 | | | | | | | | |
Electorate: 9,130 Valid: 5,159 (56.51%) Spoilt: 100 Quota: 1,032 Turnout: 5,259 (57.60%)

=== Limerick No.3 ===
Limerick No.3 - 4 seats
| Party | Candidate | FPv% | Count | | | | | | | |
| Party | Candidate | FPv% | 1 | 2 | 3 | 4 | 5 | 6 | 7 | 8 |
|---|---|---|---|---|---|---|---|---|---|---|
| Fine Gael | Diarmuid Scully* | 23.55 | 1,064 | | | | | | | |
| Fine Gael | Ger Fahy* | 20.83 | 941 | | | | | | | |
| Labour | James Houlihan | 13.26 | 599 | 619 | 668 | 788 | 944 | | | |
| Fianna Fáil | Jack Bourke* | 9.27 | 419 | 438 | 465 | 489 | 518 | 525 | 534 | 658 |
| Progressive Democrats | Jim Hickey | 8.57 | 387 | 438 | 451 | 473 | 503 | 513 | 518 | |
| Independent | Lily Wallace* | 7.33 | 331 | 353 | 391 | 446 | 539 | 562 | 585 | 727 |
| Labour | Derek Mulcahy | 6.57 | 297 | 324 | 349 | 369 | | | | |
| Independent | John Boland | 5.87 | 265 | 271 | 307 | | | | | |
| Socialist Party | Ashling Golden | 3.39 | 153 | 166 | | | | | | |
| Fianna Fáil | Patricia Stokes | 1.37 | 62 | 64 | | | | | | |
Electorate: 8,646 Valid: 4,518 (52.26%) Spoilt: 82 Quota: 904 Turnout: 4,600 (53.20%)

=== Limerick No.4 ===
Limerick No.4 - 4 seats
| Party | Candidate | FPv% | Count | | | | | | | | | | |
| Party | Candidate | FPv% | 1 | 2 | 3 | 4 | 5 | 6 | 7 | 8 | 9 | 10 | 11 |
|---|---|---|---|---|---|---|---|---|---|---|---|---|---|
| Independent | Pat Kennedy* | 20.37 | 991 | | | | | | | | | | |
| Fine Gael | Maria Byrne* | 15.87 | 772 | 805 | 808 | 872 | 1,003 | | | | | | |
| Labour | Joe Leddin* | 13.21 | 643 | 669 | 672 | 702 | 735 | 748 | 785 | 848 | 920 | 1,046 | |
| Fianna Fáil | Dick Sadlier* | 7.95 | 387 | 402 | 403 | 419 | 430 | 433 | 446 | 537 | 576 | 618 | 637 |
| Independent | Jim Long | 7.60 | 370 | 381 | 383 | 398 | 413 | 415 | 462 | 480 | 545 | 656 | 709 |
| Independent | Seán Griffin | 6.06 | 295 | 298 | 300 | 332 | 352 | 357 | 416 | 437 | 525 | | |
| Independent | Seán O'Neill | 5.26 | 256 | 256 | 257 | 266 | 276 | 277 | | | | | |
| Fianna Fáil | Tony Flannery | 5.14 | 250 | 263 | 264 | 281 | 289 | 291 | 305 | | | | |
| Fine Gael | Pat Brosnahan | 5.08 | 247 | 251 | 252 | 264 | | | | | | | |
| Progressive Democrats | Paddy Hynes | 4.81 | 234 | 289 | 290 | 306 | 327 | 330 | 379 | 404 | | | |
| Independent | Win Harrington | 4.77 | 232 | 241 | 243 | | | | | | | | |
| Progressive Democrats | Isobel Geoghegan | 3.88 | 189 | | | | | | | | | | |
Electorate: 9,688 Valid: 4,866 (50.23%) Spoilt: 96 Quota: 974 Turnout: 4,962 (51.22%)
