= 1985 Dublin County Council election in Dublin–Fingal =

Part of the 1985 Irish local elections

1985 Dublin County Council election (Dublin–Fingal)
← 1979	20 June 1985	1991 →

24 seats in the electoral county of Dublin–Fingal within Dublin County Council

An election to all 24 seats on the council of the electoral county of Dublin–Fingal within Dublin County took place on 20 June 1985 as part of the 1985 Irish local elections. Councillors were elected from 6 local electoral areas for a five-year term of office on the electoral system of proportional representation by means of the single transferable vote (PR-STV). This term was extended for a further year, to 1991.

Dublin–Fingal was one of three electoral counties in Dublin County established by the Local Government (Reorganisation) Act 1985. The councillors elected also sat as members of Dublin County Council, along with those elected for Dublin–Belgard and Dún Laoghaire–Rathdown.

== Results by local electoral area ==
=== Balbriggan ===
Balbriggan: 5 seats
Party	Candidate	FPv%	Count								
Party	Candidate	FPv%	1	2	3	4	5	6	7	8	9
Fianna Fáil	Jack Larkin		1,386	1,405	1,450	1,646					
Fine Gael	Cathal Boland*		1,245	1,272	1,285	1,298	1,300	1,593			
Fianna Fáil	Sean Gilbride		1,082	1,102	1,142	1,230	1,300	1,336	1,337	1,430	1,493
Fianna Fáil	Jim Geraghty		971	979	992	1,105	1,133	1,146	1,147	1,177	1,405
Labour	Ken Farrell		942	968	998	1,008	1,008	1,019	1,021	1,365	1,596
Independent	Catherine Cusack		640	705	748	763	763	794	796	840	
Fine Gael	Bill Reynolds*		636	644	653	742	748	854	899	959	1,070
Fine Gael	Patricia Gallen		588	614	633	646	648				
Fianna Fáil	John Maxwell		540	547	570						
Labour	Joe Davis		536	563	649	661	664	779	786		
Sinn Féin	Briege Tuite		363	394							
Green Alliance	Trevor Sargent		227								
Independent	Kay Hanratty		50								
Electorate: 17,776 Valid: 9,206 (52.6%) Spoilt: 149 Quota: 1,535 Turnout: 9,351

=== Castleknock ===
Castleknock: 4 seats
Party	Candidate	FPv%	Count								
Party	Candidate	FPv%	1	2	3	4	5	6	7	8	9
Fine Gael	Jim Fay*		922	928	944	987	1,016	1,163			
Fianna Fáil	Ned Ryan		882	884	886	890	898	909	909	1,247	
Fianna Fáil	Tom Boland		834	838	841	847	870	880	880	1,187	
Fianna Fáil	Teresa Watters		752	754	760	772	794	825	826		
Independent	Seán Lyons		714	718	761	794	916	935	939	1,015	1,098
Fine Gael	Tom Samfey		561	564	568	593	615	834	865	925	962
Fine Gael	Jennifer Payne		361	364	379	425	452				
Workers' Party	Eamonn Lynskey		219	226	249	304					
Labour	Ita Kavanagh		175	210	234						
Green Alliance	John Garvey		141	143							
Labour	Bill Hughes		69								
Electorate: 11,887 Valid: 5,630 (47.79%) Spoilt: 51 Quota: 1,127 Turnout: 5,681

=== Howth ===
Howth: 4 seats
Party	Candidate	FPv%	Count								
Party	Candidate	FPv%	1	2	3	4	5	6	7	8	9
Fine Gael	Michael Joe Cosgrave*		1,536								
Fianna Fáil	Liam Creaven		912	920	927	941	990	1,129	1,177	1,528	
Independent	Noel Peers		759	770	812	909	1,148	1,218	1,265	1,303	1,309
Fianna Fáil	Eilis Rickard		663	673	680	698	737	919	939	1,224	1,351
Fianna Fáil	Tom Kavanagh		651	655	659	675	701	775	783		
Fine Gael	Joan Maher		608	679	741	780	812	840	1,240	1,314	1,322
Fianna Fáil	Eugene Rudden		479	484	488	497	527				
Fine Gael	Muriel O Tiarnaigh		467	490	511	521	541	553			
Independent	Paul Arnold		364	373	397	476					
Workers' Party	Eugene O'Leary		263	266	322						
Labour	Tony Dermody		230	235							
Electorate: 14,314 Valid: 6,932 (48.9%) Spoilt: 68 Quota: 1,387 Turnout: 7,000

=== Malahide ===
Malahide: 4 seats
Party	Candidate	FPv%	Count						
Party	Candidate	FPv%	1	2	3	4	5	6	7
Fianna Fáil	G.V. Wright		1,724						
Labour	Bernie Malone*		1,091	1,123	1,222	1,245	1,385	1,690	
Fine Gael	Nora Owen*		905	931	953	980	1,394		
Fianna Fáil	Vincent Hughes		760	792	827	910	1,002	1,060	1,127
Fine Gael	Tom Houlihan		678	681	702	707			
Fianna Fáil	Pat Dunne*		674	800	823	974	993	1,133	1,218
Independent	Michael Howard		557	592	679	712	743		
Fianna Fáil	Linda Rafferty		253	325	337				
Green Alliance	Colm O Caomhanaigh		161	165					
Independent	Joe McDermott		147	150					
Electorate: 12,671 Valid: 6,950 (55.12%) Spoilt: 35 Quota: 1,391 Turnout: 6,985

=== Mulhuddart ===
Mulhuddart: 3 seats
Party	Candidate	FPv%	Count						
Party	Candidate	FPv%	1	2	3	4	5	6	7
Fianna Fáil	Jim Fahey		1,203						
Fianna Fáil	Marian McGennis		755	767	788	841	1,027	1,082	1,129
Workers' Party	Ollie Lunney		693	740	764	813	990	1,039	1,043
Fine Gael	Marian Sheehan		582	604	779	1,098	1,293		
Independent	Seán Lyons		521	540	576	626			
Fine Gael	Tom Reynolds		414	425	483				
Fine Gael	Liam Skelly		303	322					
Labour	Michael Martin		135						
Electorate: 10,480 Valid: 4,606 (44.35%) Spoilt: 42 Quota: 1,152 Turnout: 4,648

=== Swords ===
Swords: 4 seats
Party	Candidate	FPv%	Count			
Party	Candidate	FPv%	1	2	3	4
Fianna Fáil	Ray Burke		2,335			
Labour	Seán Ryan*		1,308			
Fianna Fáil	Cyril Gallagher*		739	1,229	1,316	
Fine Gael	Anne Devitt		652	701	788	1,258
Fine Gael	Paddy Donovan		504	532	592	
Workers' Party	Shane McManus		416	449		
Fianna Fáil	Oliver Dennis		727	849	950	1,014
Electorate: 13,877 Valid: 6,336 (46.26%) Spoilt: 83 Quota: 1,268 Turnout: 6,419
