= 2009 Limerick City Council election =

Part of the 2009 Irish local elections

- 5 June 2009

17 seats on Limerick City Council
	First party	Second party	Third party
Party	Fine Gael	Labour	Fianna Fáil
Seats won	8	4	1
Seat change	+3	-	-1
	Fourth party	Fifth party
Party	Sinn Féin	Independent
Seats won	1	3
Seat change	+1	-3
- Map showing the area of Limerick City Council
Council control after election
TBD

An election to Limerick City Council took place on 5 June 2009 as part of that year's Irish local elections. 17 councillors were elected from three local electoral areas (LEAs) for a five-year term of office on the electoral system of proportional representation by means of the single transferable vote (PR-STV).

== Results by party ==
Party	Seats	±	First Pref. votes	FPv%	±%
Fine Gael	8	+3	7,188	33.69	
Labour	4	-	3,892	18.24	
Fianna Fáil	1	-1	2,661	12.47	
Sinn Féin	1	+1	1,527	7.16	
Independent	3	-3	5,619	26.34	
Totals	17	-	21,335	100.00	—

== Results by local electoral area ==
=== Limerick City East ===
Limerick City East - 4 seats
Party	Candidate	FPv%	Count									
Party	Candidate	FPv%	1	2	3	4	5	6	7	8	9	10
Independent	John Gilligan*	20.35	972									
Fianna Fáil	Kieran O'Hanlon*	17.61	841	841	843	926	939	979				
Labour	Gerry McLoughlin*	16.62	794	808	813	848	894	938	946	1,061		
Fine Gael	Denis McCarthy	11.76	562	565	567	592	599	617	619	694	727	791
Independent	Christy Vereker	6.55	313	318	319	339	364	380	381			
Sinn Féin	Tom Collopy	6.36	304	307	309	311	368	400	404	436	448	
Independent	John Daly	6.18	295	298	299	304	320	413	421	480	498	621
Independent	Noel Hannan	5.80	277	278	279	283	299					
Fianna Fáil	Christy McInerney	3.96	189	190	191							
Independent	Joe Shanahan	3.94	188	189	200	202						
Independent	Paddy Mason	0.88	42									
Electorate: 9,225 Valid: 4,777 (51.78%) Spoilt: 59 Quota: 956 Turnout: 4,836 (52.42%)

=== Limerick City North ===
Limerick City North - 6 seats
Party	Candidate	FPv%	Count												
Party	Candidate	FPv%	1	2	3	4	5	6	7	8	9	10	11	12	13
Fine Gael	Michael Hourigan*	18.26	1,533												
Fine Gael	Cormac Hurley*	12.08	1,014	1,118	1,123	1,123	1,126	1,133	1,160	1,161	1,173	1,239			
Sinn Féin	Maurice Quinlivan	10.58	888	894	899	907	928	943	951	992	1,062	1,087	1,087	1,097	1,153
Fine Gael	Kevin Kiely*	10.46	878	945	948	953	957	961	970	990	1,011	1,029	1,045	1,076	1,162
Labour	Tom Shortt	9.81	824	843	844	845	849	853	868	884	904	1,001	1,009	1,051	1,361
Independent	Kathleen Leddin*	8.43	708	781	790	790	797	799	823	825	840	942	947	1,034	1,121
Fianna Fáil	Joe Crowley	5.84	490	461	469	469	541	555	613	706					
Fianna Fáil	John Cronin*	5.81	488	494	496	498	500	501	505	512	528	561	565	847	875
Labour	John Ryan*	5.71	479	501	502	504	507	511	520	534	553	625	630	670	
Green	James Nix	5.34	448	462	465	465	465	468	486	490	502				
Independent	Tina O'Gorman	2.07	174	176	177	188	193	210	216	223					
Independent	Denis Riordan	1.43	120	122	127	128	134	134							
Independent	Mick Ryan	1.41	118	118	118	132	136	147	149						
Independent	Tommy Daly	0.85	71	71	73	82	84								
Independent	Matt Larkin	0.73	61	62	63	65									
Independent	Patrick McCarthy	0.68	57	58	60										
Christian Solidarity	Conor O'Donoghue	0.54	45	45											
Electorate: 14,749 Valid: 8,396 (56.93%) Spoilt: 111 Quota: 1,200 Turnout: 8,507 (57.68%)

=== Limerick City South ===
Limerick City South - 7 seats
Party	Candidate	FPv%	Count														
Party	Candidate	FPv%	1	2	3	4	5	6	7	8	9	10	11	12	13	14	15
Labour	Joe Leddin*	13.64	1,113														
Fine Gael	Maria Byrne*	13.06	1,066														
Fine Gael	Ger Fahy*	11.52	940	946	961	970	971	1,008	1,018	1,051							
Fine Gael	Diarmuid Scully*	8.56	699	706	712	713	713	716	724	729	730	746	763	781	789	845	880
Independent	Pat Kennedy*	7.80	637	648	655	659	660	675	683	713	715	730	740	776	819	879	996
Fine Gael	Jim Long*	6.08	496	504	510	512	514	515	524	532	535	563	576	587	629	679	741
Labour	Orla McLoughlin	5.22	426	456	457	460	463	468	478	507	511	544	660	707	721	790	902
Fianna Fáil	Jim Hickey	5.06	413	414	415	419	455	466	556	558	558	571	581	596	608	637	680
Sinn Féin	Seán Griffin	4.10	335	338	339	343	346	349	354	384	388	419	449	459	563	625	
Independent	Lily Wallace*	3.79	309	312	313	318	319	324	328	358	361	395	428	451	487		
Independent	Pat O'Sullivan	3.64	297	301	302	303	303	307	314	320	320	334	341				
Independent	Seán O'Neill	3.30	269	271	272	273	273	278	285	293	294	331	347	356			
Labour	Derek Mulcahy	3.14	256	263	264	270	270	277	280	297	298	307					
Independent	Cathal McCarthy	3.11	254	259	261	265	266	269	275	291	292						
Independent	James Houlihan*	2.77	226	227	227	236	236	241	243								
Fianna Fáil	Tom O'Callaghan	2.13	174	176	177	180	190	193									
Independent	Jack Bourke	1.51	123	124	125	126	130										
Fianna Fáil	Anna Banko	0.81	66	67	67	68											
Independent	Robert Gardiner	0.77	63	63	63												
Electorate: 16,384 Valid: 8,162 (49.82%) Spoilt: 109 Quota: 1,021 Turnout: 8,271 (50.48%)
