= 1985 Limerick Corporation election =

Part of the 1985 Irish local elections

← 1979	20 June 1985	1991 →

All 17 seats on Limerick City Council
	First party	Second party	Third party
Party	Fine Gael	Fianna Fáil	Democratic Socialist
Seats won	6	5	3
Seat change	+1	-1	+3
	Fourth party	Fifth party
Party	Labour	Independent
Seats won	1	2
Seat change	-3	0
- Map showing the area of Limerick City Council
Council control after election
TBD

An election to Limerick City Council took place on 20 June 1985 as part of the Irish local elections. 17 councillors were elected from four local electoral areas (LEAs) for a five-year term of office on the electoral system of proportional representation by means of the single transferable vote (PR-STV). This term was extended for a further year, to 1991.

== Results by party ==
Party	Seats	±	First Pref. votes	FPv%	±%
Fine Gael	6	+1	7,246	34.25	
Fianna Fáil	5	-1	5,905	27.91	
Democratic Socialist	3	+3	3,141	14.85	
Labour	1	-3	2,477	11.71	
Independent	2	0	1,474	6.97	
Totals	17	0	21,155	100.00	—

== Results by local electoral area ==
=== Limerick Ward 1 ===
Limerick Ward 1: 4 seats
Party	Candidate	FPv%	Count					
Party	Candidate	FPv%	1	2	3	4	5	6
Democratic Socialist	Tim O'Driscoll		808	875	907	917	953	983
Fianna Fáil	John Quinn*		794	836	866	900	1,314	
Fine Gael	Tim Leddin		711	719	784	1,046		
Labour	Frank Prendergast TD*		591	625	663	764	859	948
Fianna Fáil	Tony Bromell*		579	625	649	664		
Fine Gael	Eileen Silke		544	554	609	769	816	875
Fine Gael	John O'Sullivan		522	525	606			
Fine Gael	Rosarie Moylan		325	336				
Fianna Fáil	Joe Buckley		104					
Workers' Party	Maria Collins		86					
Labour	Collette Moloney		45					
Electorate: 8,841 Valid: 5,109 (58.34%) Spoilt: 49 Quota: 1,022 Turnout: 5,158

=== Limerick Ward 2 ===
Limerick Ward 2: 5 seats
Party	Candidate	FPv%	Count										
Party	Candidate	FPv%	1	2	3	4	5	6	7	8	9	10	11
Fine Gael	Gus O'Driscoll*		1,083	1,115									
Democratic Socialist	Jan O'Sullivan		759	770	950	950	1,042	1,088	1,107				
Fine Gael	Kevin Kiely		667	693	719	721	740	874	926	949	950	974	975
Fianna Fáil	Paddy Madden*		649	661	670	672	698	743	800	919	919	1,169	
Labour	Mick Lipper*		582	650	677	684	720	786	801	856	858	921	935
Fianna Fáil	Paddy Kiely*		513	519	525	526	545	558	597	677	678		
Fianna Fáil	Larry Cross		407	408	416	417	448	489	631	686	692	947	1,012
Fine Gael	Ralph O'Brien		358	360	366	368	378						
Fianna Fáil	John Cronin		344	351	365	365	382	386					
Fianna Fáil	Daniel Powell		340	375	381	382	401	406	435				
Sinn Féin	Des Long		588	342	351	354							
Democratic Socialist	Eleanor Goodison		293	304									
Labour	Martin Vaughan		178										
Labour	John Powell		72										
Electorate: 11,862 Valid: 6,567 (56.16%) Spoilt: 95 Quota: 1,095 Turnout: 6,662

=== Limerick Ward 3 ===
Limerick Ward 3: 4 seats
Party	Candidate	FPv%	Count									
Party	Candidate	FPv%	1	2	3	4	5	6	7	8	9	10
Democratic Socialist	Jim Kemmy*		1,281									
Independent	Joe Harrington		589	667	687	712	801	819	1,019			
Fianna Fáil	Jack Bourke*		489	509	514	558	577	583	597	603	867	918
Labour	Frank Leddin*		452	501	504	512	525	545	569	585	626	723
Fine Gael	Ger Fahy		448	471	474	478	491	612	635	641	665	864
Fine Gael	Peter O'Flaherty		371	396	401	406	417	456	490	502	529	
Fianna Fáil	Jimmy Flannery		346	375	380	422	432	443	461	465		
Workers' Party	Sean Griffin		290	322	341	347	370	379				
Fine Gael	Shaun Elder		208	226	231	235	239					
Fine Gael	Dan Greaney		177	190	196	203						
Fianna Fáil	Bernie Meade		143	152	152							
Independent	Tom Clancy		76	86								
Electorate: 8,632 Valid: 4,870 (57.29%) Spoilt: 75 Quota: 975 Turnout: 4,945

=== Limerick Ward 4 ===
Limerick Ward 4: 4 seats
Party	Candidate	FPv%	Count				
Party	Candidate	FPv%	1	2	3	4	5
Fine Gael	Pat Kennedy*		1,019				
Independent	Win Harrington*		809	825	867	909	969
Fine Gael	Bobby Byrne*		738	782	898	924	
Labour	Tommy Allen*		557	567	624	639	676
Fianna Fáil	John O'Connor		536	541	559	678	1,047
Fianna Fáil	Billy Barry		371	374	385	516	
Fianna Fáil	Clem Casey*		327	331	338		
Fine Gael	Seamus Bermingham		252	267			
Electorate: 9,230 Valid: 4,609 (50.51%) Spoilt: 213 Quota: 922 Turnout: 4,622
