= 1999 Limerick Corporation election =

Part of the 1999 Irish local elections

- 10 June 1999

All 17 seats to Limerick City Council
	First party	Second party	Third party
Party	Fianna Fáil	Fine Gael	Labour
Seats won	6	5	3
Seat change	+4	+1	-2
	Fourth party	Fifth party	Sixth party
Party	Independent	Progressive Democrats	Workers' Party
Seats won	3	0	0
Seat change	+1	-3	-1
- Map showing the area of Limerick City Council
Council control after election
TBD

An election to Limerick City Council took place on 10 June 1999 as part of that year's Irish local elections. 17 councillors were elected from four local electoral areas for a five-year term of office on the system of proportional representation by means of the single transferable vote (PR-STV).

== Results by party ==
Party	Seats	±	First Pref. votes	FPv%	±%
Fianna Fáil	6	+4	4,994	27.56	
Fine Gael	5	+1	4,737	26.15	
Labour	3	-2	3,388	18.70	
Independent	3	+1	3,384	18.68	
Progressive Democrats	0	-3	1,265	6.98	
Workers' Party	0	-1	N/A	N/A	
Totals	17	0	18,118	100.00	—

== Results by local electoral area ==
=== Limerick No.1 ===
Limerick No.1 - 5 seats
Party	Candidate	FPv%	Count									
Party	Candidate	FPv%	1	2	3	4	5	6	7	8	9	10
Fianna Fáil	Peter Power	18.42	1,041									
Labour	John Ryan*	11.89	672	682	691	745	776	791	804	839	945	
Independent	Kathleen Leddin	10.88	615	627	639	645	656	711	756	815	830	966
Fine Gael	Michael Hourigan	10.56	597	605	619	624	630	654	689	737	749	858
Fianna Fáil	John Cronin	9.57	541	553	554	560	575	593	603	664	810	862
Fine Gael	Kevin Kiely	8.95	506	508	513	529	550	555	561	569	625	657
Fianna Fáil	Tim O'Driscoll	5.73	324	333	339	363	384	390	397	450		
Progressive Democrats	Tom Frawley	5.47	309	316	326	329	331	352	464	488	502	
Fianna Fáil	Eamon O'Brien	4.53	256	281	286	288	293	309	332			
Progressive Democrats	Anne O'Keeffe	4.46	252	258	262	265	266	275				
Independent	Mary Collins	2.88	163	166	180	184	196					
Sinn Féin	Padraig Malone	2.53	143	144	149	156						
Labour	Seán Flanagan	2.42	137	138	139							
Independent	Barney Sheehan	1.72	97	99								
Electorate: 11,623 Valid: 5,653 (48.64%) Spoilt: 52 Quota: 943 Turnout: 5,705 (49.08%)

=== Limerick No.2 ===
Limerick No.2 - 4 seats
Party	Candidate	FPv%	Count									
Party	Candidate	FPv%	1	2	3	4	5	6	7	8	9	10
Labour	Jan O'Sullivan TD*	21.37	1,041									
Independent	John Gilligan*	18.42	877									
Fianna Fáil	Kieran O'Hanlon*	16.23	666	680	691	708	728	744	818	888		
Fianna Fáil	Larry Cross	9.63	395	401	408	428	437	458	516	550	573	658
Fine Gael	Eddie Butler	6.78	278	290	295	304	381	425	439	471	475	543
Fianna Fáil	Jim McMahon	5.05	207	210	213	223	228	235				
Progressive Democrats	Billy Morgan	4.17	171	175	178	189	200	266	299	336	356	
Labour	Peggy Kirwan	4.17	171	197	207	236	247	254	283			
Fine Gael	Annette Burke-McGreen	3.80	156	164	167	171						
Progressive Democrats	Mary Lane Kelly	3.66	150	159	162	174	193					
Independent	Gerry Hannan	1.58	65	66	73							
Green	Aine McCarthy	1.44	59	63	67							
Electorate: 8,867 Valid: 4,103 (46.27%) Spoilt: 51 Quota: 821 Turnout: 4,154 (46.85%)

=== Limerick No.3 ===
Limerick No.3 - 4 seats
Party	Candidate	FPv%	Count										
Party	Candidate	FPv%	1	2	3	4	5	6	7	8	9	10	11
Independent	Michael Kelly	22.27	914										
Fine Gael	Ger Fahy	16.87	692	699	701	707	730	740	757	808	828		
Fianna Fáil	Jack Bourke*	12.62	518	526	529	533	539	550	563	599	713	717	781
Fine Gael	Diarmuid Scully	12.45	511	514	517	523	529	532	598	626	729	730	756
Labour	Seamus Houlihan*	7.70	316	328	330	333	357	382	389	433	452	453	598
Fianna Fáil	Tom Ryan	6.29	258	260	262	268	273	280	318	337			
Labour	John Boland	5.99	246	271	277	287	296	337	344	396	409	409	
Labour	Derek Mulcahy	5.53	227	232	235	235	236	243	254				
Independent	Jim Hickey	4.21	173	175	177	184	188	191					
Labour	Tony Clancy	2.02	83	96	104	106	114						
Labour	Michael Hartnett	2.02	83	85	89	92							
Independent	Noel Hannon	1.12	46	56	58								
Natural Law	Raymond McInerney	0.93	38	41									
Electorate: 8,676 Valid: 4,105 (47.31%) Spoilt: 61 Quota: 822 Turnout: 4,166 (48.02%)

=== Limerick No.4 ===
Limerick No.4 - 4 seats
Party	Candidate	FPv%	Count							
Party	Candidate	FPv%	1	2	3	4	5	6	7	8
Fine Gael	Pat Kennedy*	24.49	1,010							
Fine Gael	Maria Byrne	23.93	987							
Labour	Joe Leddin	9.99	412	456	501	519	536	558	599	743
Progressive Democrats	Paddy Hynes	9.29	383	419	434	452	494	521	560	645
Independent	Win Harrington	7.66	316	359	408	429	458	478	519	
Fianna Fáil	Dick Sadlier*	7.42	306	327	348	350	362	406	616	723
Fianna Fáil	John O'Connor	6.60	272	285	294	297	307	401		
Fianna Fáil	John McGrath	5.09	210	224	233	240	247			
Republican Sinn Féin	Des Long	3.59	148	155	161	170				
Independent	Ger Cusack	1.94	80	87	95					
Electorate: 9,113 Valid: 4,124 (45.25%) Spoilt: 62 Quota: 825 Turnout: 4,186 (45.93%)
