= 1985 Dublin County Council election in Dublin–Belgard =

Part of the 1985 Irish local elections

1985 Dublin County Council election (Dublin–Belgard)
- 20 June 1985

26 seats to the electoral county of Dublin–Belgard within Dublin County Council
- Map showing the area of Dublin–Belgard

An election to the electoral county of Dublin–Belgard within Dublin County to Dublin County Council took place on 20 June 1985 as part of that year's Irish local elections. Councillors were elected from local electoral areas on the system of proportional representation by means of the single transferable vote voting for a five-year term of office.This term was extended for a further year, to 1991.

Dublin–Belgard was one of three electoral counties established by the Local Government (Reorganisation) Act 1985.

== Results by local electoral area ==
=== Clondalkin ===
Clondalkin: 3 seats
Party	Candidate	FPv%	Count								
Party	Candidate	FPv%	1	2	3	4	5	6	7	8	9
Fianna Fáil	Mary Harney TD*		2,098								
Fianna Fáil	Colm McGrath		1,111	1,210	1,227	1,232	1,304	1,332	1,375	1,420	1,560
Fine Gael	Therese Ridge		631	646	660	695	751	846	901	1,541	1,660
Fianna Fáil	Noel Hayes		618	768	780	789	823	882	974	994	1,204
Fine Gael	Leon Hennessy		597	613	626	635	667	730	773		
Sinn Féin	Hugh Boyle		573	582	593	604	640	687	932	946	
Workers' Party	Anne Finnegan		481	487	499	532	579	681			
Independent	Paul Price		296	305	322	334					
Labour	Eugene Fitzsimons		289	294	360	501	522				
Labour	Robert Dowds		219	223	263						
Labour	Declan O Broin		197	204							
Electorate: 15,983 Valid: 7,110 (44.97%) Spoilt: 78 Quota: 1,778 Turnout: 7,188

=== Greenhills ===
Greenhills: 4 seats
Party	Candidate	FPv%	Count						
Party	Candidate	FPv%	1	2	3	4	5	6	7
Fianna Fáil	Chris Flood		2,183						
Fine Gael	Senator Larry McMahon*		768	822	862	880	993	1,030	1,465
Workers' Party	Terry Delaney		742	782	852	864	994	1,190	1,262
Independent	Gerry Jago		588	726	781	793	851	917	952
Fine Gael	Therese McGarry		516	543	558	564	654	659	
Sinn Féin	Cliona Nic Mhurchu		489	501	527	532	555		
Fianna Fáil	Padraig Lynch		443	841	877	1,179	1,225	1,314	1,370
Labour	Kevin Forsyth		429	450	494	512			
Fianna Fáil	Richard Raymond		227	362	386				
Independent	Sammy Macken		220	233					
Green Alliance	Patricia Greene		100	103					
Electorate: 14,967 Valid: 6,705 (45.41%) Spoilt: 94 Quota: 1,342 Turnout: 6,797

=== Lucan ===
Lucan: 4 seats
Party	Candidate	FPv%	Count						
Party	Candidate	FPv%	1	2	3	4	5	6	7
Fianna Fáil	Liam Lawlor TD*		1,827						
Fianna Fáil	Finbarr Hanrahan		1,091	1,126	1,145	1,182	1,643	1,715	1,937
Fine Gael	Brian Fleming*		1,067	1,071	1,087	1,243	1,322	1,593	1,714
Fine Gael	Peter Brady		991	996	1,008	1,029	1,034	1,169	1,294
Workers' Party	Michael Finnegan		992	905	981	1,038	1,058	1,129	
Labour	Michael Gannon*		887	894	929	1,129	1,155	1,223	1,578
Fine Gael	Tommy Morris		601	603	609	653	673		
Fianna Fáil	Dave McSweeney		562	589	602	644			
Labour	Michael Brennan		556	557	579				
Green Alliance	Joseph Harden		147	148					
Communist	Jean Roche		77	77					
Electorate: 17,496 Valid: 8,708 (50.29%) Spoilt: 90 Quota: 1,742 Turnout: 8,798

=== Rathfarnam ===
Rathfarnam: 4 seats
Party	Candidate	FPv%	Count							
Party	Candidate	FPv%	1	2	3	4	5	6	7	8
Fianna Fáil	Seamus Brennan TD		1,957							
Fine Gael	Alan Shatter TD*		1,611							
Fine Gael	Mary Muldoon		867	899	920	1,038	1,133	1,759		
Fianna Fáil	Ann Ormonde		741	964	965	1,002	1,041	1,060	1,108	1,756
Fianna Fáil	Stephen Riney		668	756	757	780	819	833	858	
Independent	Tom Sharkey		541	557	559	641	873	915	1,037	1,150
Fine Gael	Anne D'Alton		506	519	536	619	725			
Green Alliance	Fiona Garland		465	475	476	582				
Labour	Marie Woods		460	471	475					
Electorate: 16,535 Valid: 7,816 (47.55%) Spoilt: 46 Quota: 1,564 Turnout: 7,862

=== Tallaght–Oldbawn ===
Tallaght–Oldbawn: 3 seats
Party	Candidate	FPv%	Count											
Party	Candidate	FPv%	1	2	3	4	5	6	7	8	9	10	11	12
Fianna Fáil	John Hannon		1,146	1,150	1,160	1,179	1,199	1,231	1,278	1,308	1,383	1,781		
Fianna Fáil	Jim Barry		848	851	863	890	899	913	951	1,016	1,263	1,633		
Fianna Fáil	Sean Basquille		782	785	791	803	824	881	893	923	978			
Sinn Féin	Stan Clarke		608	615	620	650	656	668	698	870				
Fine Gael	Breda Cass		582	593	608	624	741	837	904	947	990	1,082	1,162	1,184
Fine Gael	Jim Higgins		504	511	525	556	714	783	895	980	1,070	1,112	1,144	1,157
Workers' Party	Brian McCabe		381	401	414	494	501	560	632					
Fine Gael	Seamus Murphy		348	361	370	382								
Democratic Socialist	Eamonn Maloney		308	323	331									
Independent	Mary Kearney		306	329	337	395	411	437						
Labour	Tony Deegan		255	262	362	390	404							
Labour	Anne Kinsella		189	202										
Green Alliance	Freda O'Neill		131											
Electorate: 14,687 Valid: 6,388 (44.1%) Spoilt: 89 Quota: 1,598 Turnout: 6,477

=== Tallaght–Rathcoole ===
Tallaght–Rathcoole: 3 seats
Party	Candidate	FPv%	Count								
Party	Candidate	FPv%	1	2	3	4	5	6	7	8	9
Fianna Fáil	Seán Walsh TD*		1,139	1,141	1,156	1,163	1,256	1,293	1,374	1,434	1,533
Labour	Mervyn Taylor TD*		944	960	996	1,030	1,054	1,348	1,726		
Workers' Party	Pat Rabbitte		917	925	991	1,003	1,039	1,065	1,087	1,135	1,547
Sinn Féin	John Noonan		794	796	837	852	882	922	948	961	
Fianna Fáil	Charlie O'Connor		722	727	738	746	937	954	990	1,017	1,141
Labour	Austin Nolan		473	480	489	492	501				
Fine Gael	Brid Hayes		439	445	448	605	610	674			
Fianna Fáil	Mary Morton		361	364	396	399					
Fine Gael	Frank Farrell		238	240	242						
Independent	Stephen Mahon		225	229							
Green Alliance	Kate O'Brien		57								
Electorate: 12,980 Valid: 6,309 (49.18%) Spoilt: 74 Quota: 1,578 Turnout: 6,383

=== Terenure ===
Terenure: 5 seats
Party	Candidate	FPv%	Count										
Party	Candidate	FPv%	1	2	3	4	5	6	7	8	9	10	11
Fine Gael	Stanley Laing*		2,017										
Fianna Fáil	Sean Ardagh		1,356	1,362	1,371	1,417	1,440	1,466	1,495	1,513	1,789		
Fianna Fáil	Seamus McGowan		1,120	1,128	1,133	1,195	1,230	1,253	1,305	1,325	1,639	2,372	
Fianna Fáil	Gerry Mullally		858	866	871	906	916	925	937	965	1,074		
Independent	Seamus Ashe		760	765	809	871	885	1,048	1,127	1,149	1,202	1,256	1,395
Fianna Fáil	Sonny Knowles		724	728	735	766	772	789	854	872			
Fine Gael	Martin Lynch		708	824	853	865	909	929	978	1,627	1,662	1,770	
Fine Gael	Declan Ryan*		612	676	694	704	771	787	851				
Labour	Éamonn Walsh		583	589	600	614	720	802	1,172	1,220	1,252	1,281	1,335
Labour	Tom Murtagh		549	554	562	576	679	760					
Workers' Party	Shay Kelly		388	390	437	453	475						
Labour	Katherine Maguire		385	402	425	442							
Independent	Michael J. Stokes		310	315	335								
Green Alliance	Denis Deasy		228	232									
Electorate: 23,022 Valid: 10,598 (46.46%) Spoilt: 93 Quota: 1,767 Turnout: 10,695
