= 1985 Dublin County Council election in Dún Laoghaire–Rathdown =

Part of the 1985 Irish local elections

- 20 June 1985

28 seats to the electoral county of Dún Laoghaire–Rathdown within Dublin County Council

An election to the electoral county of Dún Laoghaire–Rathdown within Dublin County to Dublin County Council took place on 20 June 1985 as part of that year's Irish local elections. Councillors were elected from local electoral areas on the system of proportional representation by means of the single transferable vote voting for a five-year term of office. This term was extended for a further year, to 1991.

Dún Laoghaire–Rathdown was one of three electoral counties in Dublin County established by the Local Government (Reorganisation) Act 1985. The county electoral areas of Ballybrack, Blackrock and Dún Laoghaire served as the relevant electoral areas for the election to the corporation of Dun Laoghaire.

== Results by LEA ==
=== Ballybrack ===
Ballybrack: 5 seats
Party	Candidate	FPv%	Count												
Party	Candidate	FPv%	1	2	3	4	5	6	7	8	9	10	11	12	13
Fine Gael	Donal Marren		1,226	1,245	1,269	1,276	1,293	1,383	1,435	1,791					
Fianna Fáil	Richard Conroy		1,191	1,194	1,204	1,316	1,348	1,362	1,403	1,415	1,419	1,671			
Fianna Fáil	Owen Hammond		859	861	864	960	1,014	1,024	1,062	1,090	1,096	1,393	1,540	1,641	
Workers' Party	Eamon Gilmore		848	866	899	902	1,043	1,057	1,100	1,108	1,111	1,170	1,297	1,301	1,314
Labour	Frank Smyth		763	859	892	897	935	964	997	1,043	1,061	1,102	1,267	1,270	1,279
Fianna Fáil	David Kane		607	612	620	690	713	723	749	756	758				
Fine Gael	Steve Nalty		605	610	618	624	628	653	727						
Independent	Pat O'Reilly		561	567	609	617	663	671	851	911	923	954			
Fine Gael	Barbara Culleton		554	558	580	590	592	865	937	1,123	1,306	1,332	1,566		
Independent	Joan Callaghan		483	497	531	539	560	585							
Fine Gael	Jim Ansbro		469	479	491	492	501								
Sinn Féin	Mick O'Brien		454	456	461	465									
Fianna Fáil	Mary Gray		322	324	331										
Green	Philip Kearney		245	248											
Labour	Tim Wilson		165												
Independent	Victor Boyhan		25												
Electorate: 20,774 Valid: 9,377 (45.46%) Spoilt: 66 Quota: 1,563 Turnout: 9,443

=== Blackrock ===
Blackrock: 4 seats
Party	Candidate	FPv%	Count					
Party	Candidate	FPv%	1	2	3	4	5	6
Fine Gael	John H. Dockrell*		1,328	1,340	1,379	1,456	1,475	1,705
Fianna Fáil	Paddy Madigan		1,121	1,149	1,185	1,233	1,435	1,526
Fine Gael	Aine Elliot*		1,119	1,127	1,213	1,288	1,316	1,632
Fianna Fáil	Anne Brady*		1,113	1,130	1,185	1,220	1,661	
Fianna Fáil	Michael Cotter		693	715	745	767		
Fine Gael	William O'Grady		663	688	734	774	789	
Labour	Niamh Bhreathnach		577	618	757	1,080	1,111	1,190
Labour	Kevin Cronin		548	589	651			
Green	Betty Reeves		476	564				
Workers' Party	Eamonn Daly		312					
Electorate: 18,849 Valid: 7,950 (42.59%) Spoilt: 77 Quota: 1,591 Turnout: 8,027

=== Clonskeagh ===
Clonskeagh: 3 seats
Party	Candidate	FPv%	Count						
Party	Candidate	FPv%	1	2	3	4	5	6	7
Fine Gael	Tom Hand*		1,784						
Fianna Fáil	Seamus Brock		1,165	1,179	1,197	1,253	1,282	1,330	1,599
Fine Gael	Gina Menzies		888	1,037	1,055	1,073	1,200	1,510	1,573
Fianna Fáil	Pól MacMurchú		800	806	812	820	839	871	1,254
Fianna Fáil	Paul McNulty		662	672	677	690	732	765	
Green	Ingrid Masterson		370	375	377	433			
Workers' Party	Gerry Nolan		249	254	267				
Labour	Peter Nolan		246	254	346	440	578		
Labour	Willie Byrne		149	157					
Electorate: 14,231 Valid: 6,313 (44.85%) Spoilt: 70 Quota: 1,579 Turnout: 6,383

=== Dundrum ===
Dundrum: 4 seats
Party	Candidate	FPv%	Count							
Party	Candidate	FPv%	1	2	3	4	5	6	7	8
Fianna Fáil	Tom Kitt*		2,509							
Fianna Fáil	Tony Fox		782	1,205	1,219	1,302	1,374	1,393	2,058	
Labour	Frank Buckley*		730	786	853	898	1,130	1,213	1,264	1,358
Fine Gael	Mary Elliott		662	707	744	749	815	1,109	1,211	1,290
Fine Gael	Austin Corcoran		642	699	724	735	760	985	1,051	1,113
Fine Gael	Myles Tierney*		564	616	631	634	672			
Fianna Fáil	Trevor Matthews		505	845	859	883	932	962		
Workers' Party	Eamonn O Liadhain		435	460	520	615				
Sinn Féin	Don Begley		313	331	342					
Green	Murrough Lacy		201	207						
Independent	Gabriel McGovern		59	65						
Electorate: 15,568 Valid: 7,402 (47.9%) Spoilt: 53 Quota: 1,481 Turnout: 7,457

=== Dún Laoghaire ===
Dún Laoghaire: 5 seats
Party	Candidate	FPv%	Count														
Party	Candidate	FPv%	1	2	3	4	5	6	7	8	9	10	11	12	13	14	15
Fine Gael	Liam T. Cosgrave TD		2,456														
Fianna Fáil	Betty Coffey		1,110	1,119	1,125	1,132	1,151	1,160	1,198	1,211	1,362	1,387	1,403	1,424	1,435	1,791	1,873
Sinn Féin	Kevin Fitzpatrick		1,063	1,070	1,077	1,080	1,086	1,098	1,112	1,235	1,266	1,307	1,321	1,342	1,345	1,387	1,483
Fianna Fáil	Bill Harvey*		1,057	1,061	1,066	1,074	1,080	1,093	1,097	1,134	1,249	1,306	1,331	1,345	1,353	1,887	1,993
Fine Gael	Brendan Henderson*		857	951	958	966	984	998	1,023	1,037	1,057	1,160	1,503	2,243			
Fianna Fáil	Adrian Hardiman		854	859	865	867	870	877	887	905	1,052	1,074	1,080	1,098	1,111		
Labour	Jane Dillon-Byrne*		700	715	727	760	787	837	932	994	1,007	1,179	1,238	1,310	1,408	1,471	2,041
Labour	Eric Doyle*		663	679	684	701	707	723	755	814	831	974	1,001	1,052	1,133	1,169	
Fine Gael	John O'Sullivan		575	623	623	636	648	661	685	696	699	735					
Labour	Jack Loughran*		524	531	534	564	566	584	600	670	683						
Fine Gael	Elizabeth Gregan		503	508	510	510	515	518	529	552							
Fine Gael	Mark Crimmins		435	642	646	650	679	687	725	741	766	784	998				
Workers' Party	Aidan Kendrick		406	409	415	416	423	471	520								
Green	Theresa Butterfield		287	289	305	310	357	401									
Democratic Socialist	Christy Hudson		241	242	250	254	263										
Independent	Victor Boyhan		202	202	212	212											
Labour	Philip Murphy		134	136	136												
Independent	Ubi Dwyer		101	102													
Electorate: 27,482 Valid: 12,168 (44.72%) Spoilt: 123 Quota: 2,029 Turnout: 12,291

=== Glencullen ===
Glencullen: 3 seats
Party	Candidate	FPv%	Count							
Party	Candidate	FPv%	1	2	3	4	5	6	7	8
Fianna Fáil	Edward McDonald		1,271	1,275	1,290	1,351	1,499	1,516	2,036	
Fianna Fáil	Jimmy Murphy		1,042	1,040	1,066	1,072	1,117	1,159	1,407	1,742
Fine Gael	Sam Carroll*		881	888	931	1,009	1,066	1,423	1,551	1,563
Fianna Fáil	Larry Butler		855	856	877	891	932	962		
Fine Gael	Jim Gildea		827	834	867	974	1,037	1,401	1,432	1,436
Fine Gael	Joseph Curry		684	686	731	794	840			
Workers' Party	Denis O'Callaghan		419	423	485	581				
Labour	Justin Kilcullen		357	430	478					
Green	Alison Badrian		296	298						
Labour	Roger Cole		105							
Electorate: 14,499 Valid: 6,737 (46.83%) Spoilt: 53 Quota: 1,685 Turnout: 6,790

=== Stillorgan ===
Stillorgan: 4 seats
Party	Candidate	FPv%	Count					
Party	Candidate	FPv%	1	2	3	4	5	6
Labour	Eithne Fitzgerald*		1,328	1,352	1,411	1,464	1,513	1,735
Fianna Fáil	Paddy Hickey*		1,228	1,243	1,266	1,268	1,458	1,505
Fianna Fáil	Don Lydon		1,211	1,234	1,276	1,293	1,557	1,638
Fine Gael	Olivia Mitchell		1,013	1,035	1,073	1,356	1,393	1,489
Fine Gael	Donal Lowry		942	957	1,002	1,190	1,210	1,266
Fianna Fáil	Carmel Ryan		546	558	591	598		
Fine Gael	Chris O'Malley		537	543	571			
Green	Joseph Thornton		429	472	607	617	638	
Independent	Fred O'Brien		391	442				
Independent	M. MacFeorais		219					
Electorate: 17,976 Valid: 7,844 (43.91%) Spoilt: 50 Quota: 1,569 Turnout: 7,894
