= Niamh Bhreathnach =

Irish politician (1945–2023)

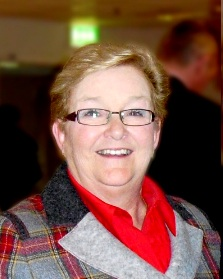

Minister for Education
- In office 15 December 1994 – 26 June 1997
- Taoiseach: John Bruton
- Preceded by: Michael Smith
- Succeeded by: Micheál Martin
- In office 12 January 1993 – 17 November 1994
- Taoiseach: Albert Reynolds
- Preceded by: Séamus Brennan
- Succeeded by: Michael Smith

Teachta Dála
- In office November 1992 – June 1997
- Constituency: Dún Laoghaire

Senator
- In office 13 June 1997 – 17 September 1997
- Constituency: Nominated by the Taoiseach

Personal details
- Born: 1 June 1945 Loughlinstown, Dublin, Ireland
- Died: 6 February 2023 (aged 77) Blackrock, Dublin, Ireland
- Party: Labour Party
- Spouse: Tom Ferris (m. 1981)
- Children: 2
- Parent: Breandán Breathnach (father)
- Education: Froebel College of Education

Niamh Síle Bhreathnach (Irish: [n̠ʲiəw ˈʃiːlʲə ˈvʲɾʲahnˠəx]; 1 June 1945 – 6 February 2023) was an Irish Labour Party politician who served as Minister for Education from 1993 to 1994 and 1994 to 1997.

She served as a Teachta Dála (TD) for the Dún Laoghaire constituency from 1992 to 1997. She was a senator from June 1997 to July 1997, after being nominated by the Taoiseach.

== Early life and education ==
Niamh Síle Bhreathnach was born in Loughlinstown, Dublin, on 1 June 1945. She was the daughter of Breandán Breathnach, a civil servant and collector of traditional music. She was educated at Dominican College Sion Hill and Froebel College of Education, Dublin, later qualifying as a remedial teacher.

== Career ==
Bhreathnach sought election for the first time in 1985, standing in the local electoral area of Blackrock at the 1985 Dublin County Council election. Bhreathnach was chairperson of the Labour Party from 1990 until 1993. She was first elected to Dublin County Council at the 1991 election.

Bhreathnach was elected as a TD for Dún Laoghaire at the 1992 general election, serving until her defeat at the 1997 general election. In January 1993, she was appointed minister for education in the Fianna Fáil–Labour Party coalition government, serving until Labour left government in November 1994. She was appointed to the same post in December 1994 in the Rainbow Coalition, serving until June 1997.

During her time as minister, the first white paper on Education was published, tuition fees for third-level institutions were abolished, and the Regional Technical Colleges were upgraded to Institutes of Technology. She also brought in the legacy posts, extra teaching positions for disadvantaged schools. She introduced the University Act 1997, which made universities accountable for the public money they receive.

After losing her Dáil seat in 1997, Bhreathnach was nominated by the outgoing Taoiseach, John Bruton, to the last days of the 20th Seanad. She sought a nomination from the Labour Party for the elections to the 21st Seanad, and there was some surprise when she was not one of the five candidates nominated by the party. She did not seek a nomination from the nominating bodies.

Bhreathnach stood again for the Dáil at the 2002 general election, but did not regain her seat, and did not contest the 2007 general election. She was a member of Dún Laoghaire–Rathdown County Council for the Blackrock local electoral area from 2004 to 2014.

== Personal life and death ==
Bhreathnach was married to Tom Ferris, with whom she had two children. Bhreathnach died in Blackrock, Dublin, on 6 February 2023, at age 77.

Political offices
Preceded by Séamus Brennan	Minister for Education; 1993–1994	Succeeded by Michael Smith
Preceded by Michael Smith	Minister for Education; 1994–1997	Succeeded by Micheál Martin

Dáil	Election	Deputy (Party)	Deputy (Party)	Deputy (Party)	Deputy (Party)	Deputy (Party)
21st	1977	David Andrews (FF)	Liam Cosgrave (FG)	Barry Desmond (Lab)	Martin O'Donoghue (FF)	4 seats 1977–1981
22nd	1981	David Andrews (FF)	Liam T. Cosgrave (FG)	Barry Desmond (Lab)	Martin O'Donoghue (FF)	Seán Barrett (FG)
23rd	1982 (Feb)	David Andrews (FF)	Liam T. Cosgrave (FG)	Barry Desmond (Lab)	Martin O'Donoghue (FF)	Seán Barrett (FG)
24th	1982 (Nov)	David Andrews (FF)	Liam T. Cosgrave (FG)	Barry Desmond (Lab)	Monica Barnes (FG)	Seán Barrett (FG)
25th	1987	David Andrews (FF)	Geraldine Kennedy (PDs)	Barry Desmond (Lab)	Monica Barnes (FG)	Seán Barrett (FG)
26th	1989	David Andrews (FF)	Brian Hillery (FF)	Eamon Gilmore (WP)	Monica Barnes (FG)	Seán Barrett (FG)
27th	1992	David Andrews (FF)	Helen Keogh (PDs)	Eamon Gilmore (DL)	Niamh Bhreathnach (Lab)	Seán Barrett (FG)
28th	1997	David Andrews (FF)	Monica Barnes (FG)	Eamon Gilmore (Lab)	Mary Hanafin (FF)	Seán Barrett (FG)
29th	2002	Barry Andrews (FF)	Fiona O'Malley (PDs)	Eamon Gilmore (Lab)	Mary Hanafin (FF)	Ciarán Cuffe (GP)
30th	2007	Barry Andrews (FF)	Seán Barrett (Note: Served as Ceann Comhairle in the 31st Dáil from 2011 to 2016 and was returned automatically at the 2016 general election.) (FG)	Eamon Gilmore (Lab)	Mary Hanafin (FF)	Ciarán Cuffe (GP)
31st	2011	Mary Mitchell O'Connor (FG)	Seán Barrett (FG)	Eamon Gilmore (Lab)	Richard Boyd Barrett (PBP)	4 seats from 2011
32nd	2016	Mary Mitchell O'Connor (FG)	Seán Barrett (FG)	Maria Bailey (FG)	Richard Boyd Barrett (AAA–PBP)	4 seats from 2011
33rd	2020	Jennifer Carroll MacNeill (FG)	Ossian Smyth (GP)	Cormac Devlin (FF)	Richard Boyd Barrett (S–PBP)	4 seats from 2011
34th	2024	Jennifer Carroll MacNeill (FG)	Barry Ward (FG)	Cormac Devlin (FF)	Richard Boyd Barrett (PBP–S)	4 seats from 2011
