= 1991 Dublin County Council election =

Part of the 1991 Irish local elections

← 1985	27 June 1991	1999 (DLR); 1999 (Fingal); 1999 (S. Dublin) →

78 seats on Dublin County Council
	First party	Second party	Third party
Party	Fianna Fáil	Fine Gael	Labour
Seats won	23	19	14
Seat change	−16	−7	+6
	Fourth party	Fifth party	Sixth party
Party	Progressive Democrats	Workers' Party	Green
Seats won	7	6	6
Seat change	+7	+3	+6
	Seventh party
Party	Independent
Seats won	3
Seat change	+1

An election to Dublin County Council took place on 27 June 1991 as part of that year's Irish local elections. Councillors were elected for a five-year term of office from local electoral areas (LEAs) on the system of proportional representation by means of the single transferable vote (PR-STV). It was the last election held for Dublin County Council.

The election took place in three electoral counties:

- Dún Laoghaire–Rathdown
- Fingal
- South Dublin

From 1 January 1994, on the coming into effect of the Local Government (Dublin) Act 1993, County Dublin was disestablished as an administrative county, and in its place, the electoral counties became three new counties: Dún Laoghaire–Rathdown, Fingal and South Dublin. From that date, councillors elected for the electoral counties of Dublin County Council became councillors of the respective county councils:

- Dún Laoghaire–Rathdown County Council
- Fingal County Council
- South Dublin County Council

The term of office was extended twice, first to 1998, then to 1999.
