= Fionn McLoughlin =

- Born: 6 September 1982 (age 44) Limerick, Ireland
- Height: 188 cm (6 ft 2 in)
- Notable relative: Gerry McLoughlin

Rugby union career
- Position(s): Centre, fly half, winger
- Current team: Tunbridge Wells
Senior career
Years	Team	Apps	(Points)
- Shannon
–	Munster		
2001	Galwegians		
2001	Connacht		
2002-2007	Caerphilly		
2007	Pontypridd / Llanharan		
2008	Bedwas		
2009	Shannon		
2010-2015	Plymouth Albion		
2015-2017	Old Elthamians		
2017	Tunbridge Wells RFC		

Fionn McLoughlin (born 6 September 1982) is an Irish rugby union player. He has represented both Ireland and Wales at the youth level. He plays centre, winger and fly half. He is the son of former Ireland and British Lions prop Gerry McLoughlin.

== Early life ==
Born in Limerick, Ireland on 6 September 1982, McLoughlin grew up in Wales where his father was a teacher. In 1999, he played for Cardinal Newman Roman Catholic School in Rhydyfelin in the Welsh Schools Under-18 Cup Final at the Millennium Stadium in Cardiff.

== Career ==
McLoughlin started his career at Shannon RFC where he played for Irish region Munster Rugby He also played for Galwegians RFC and Connacht Rugby in 2001. In 2002, McLoughlin moved to Welsh club Caerphilly RFC where he took part in their 2002-03 European Shield campaign. In 2007, McLoughlin moved to Pontypridd RFC on a dual-registration with Llanharan RFC. In 2008, McLoughlin joined Bedwas RFC owing to limited opportunities at Pontypridd. In 2009, McLoughlin returned to Ireland to rejoin Shannon where he helped them win the All-Ireland League. During the [Northern Hemisphere] summer, he played in Australia for the University of Western Australia RUFC.

Later that year, he had a trial with English RFU Championship team Plymouth Albion R.F.C., where he was signed permanently. In 2015, McLoughlin was signed by National League 2 South Old Elthamians. In 2017, McLoughlin joined Tunbridge Wells RFC, where he played a part in them achieving a second successive promotion.

=== International career ===
McLoughlin has represented both the Wales national under-18 rugby union team and the Ireland national under-19 rugby union team at international level. He was also called up for the Ireland Club XV against England Counties XV.
