= 1985 Waterford Corporation election =

Part of the 1985 Irish local elections

- 20 June 1985

All 15 seats on Waterford City Council
	First party	Second party	Third party
Party	Fianna Fáil	Fine Gael	Workers' Party
Seats won	5	4	2
Seat change	0	0	0
	Fourth party	Fifth party	Sixth party
Party	Labour	Waterford People's Party	Independent
Seats won	2	1	1
Seat change	0	+1	0
- Map showing the area of Waterford City Council

An election to all 15 seats on Waterford City Council took place on 20 June 1985 as part of the 1985 Irish local elections. Councillors were elected from three local electoral areas (LEAs) for a five-year term of office on the electoral system of proportional representation by means of the single transferable vote (PR-STV). This term was extended for a further year, to 1991.

== Results by party ==
Party	Seats	±	First Pref. votes	FPv%	±%
Fianna Fáil	5	0	4,347	30.18	
Fine Gael	4	0	3,309	22.97	
Workers' Party	2	0	1,488	10.33	
Waterford People's Party	1	▲1	1,405	9.75	
Labour	2	0	1,346	9.35	
Independent	1	0	2,269	15.75	
Totals	15	0	14,403	100.00	—

Waterford People's Party was a localised split in the Workers' Party. It was not a registered political party.

== Results by local electoral area ==
=== Waterford No. 1 ===
Waterford No. 1: 5 seats
Party	Candidate	FPv%	Count									
Party	Candidate	FPv%	1	2	3	4	5	6	7	8	9	10
Fianna Fáil	Patrick Power*		776	785	795	815	904					
Fine Gael	Hilary Quinlan		727	794	801	823	845					
Fine Gael	James Brett		612	665	668	679	688	690	702	765	768	802
Workers' Party	Davy Walsh*		455	459	605	660	668	675	756	826	829	848
Independent	Martin Cullen		350	364	376	411	432	435	475	546	547	598
Fianna Fáil	Tony Roche		335	344	350	362	410	438	471	506	511	773
Fianna Fáil	Larry Dower		315	323	325	334	336	392	412	443	444	
Labour	George Wadding		275	287	295	313	333	337	353			
Sinn Féin	Noel Ryan		273	273	278	292	296	298				
Fianna Fáil	Ann O'Rourke		236	243	251	271						
Waterford People's Party	Mick Dunphy		222	227	236							
Workers' Party	Billy McCarthy		217	219								
Fine Gael	Ann Raleigh		193									
Electorate: 8,788 Valid: 4,986 (57.31%) Spoilt: 50 Quota: 832 Turnout: 5,036

=== Waterford No. 2 ===
Waterford No. 2: 5 seats
Party	Candidate	FPv%	Count								
Party	Candidate	FPv%	1	2	3	4	5	6	7	8	9
Independent	Davy Daniels*		937								
Fine Gael	Sen. Katharine Bulbulia		658	664	677	701	730	778	866		
Labour	Liam Curham*		634	663	681	749	789	826	899		
Fianna Fáil	Brendan Kenneally		547	555	569	594	706	754	801	820	826
Fine Gael	Stephen Rogers*		518	524	535	560	579	644	725	742	759
Fianna Fáil	Donal Ormonde TD		498	504	511	540	609	663	720	734	737
Independent	Richard Jones*		297	307	323	345	363	416			
Waterford People's Party	Joe Falvey		294	305	318						
Fine Gael	Mary Griffin		290	300	305	323					
Independent	Frank King		286	293	300	328	340				
Workers' Party	Dick McGrath		116								
Electorate: 8,368 Valid: 5,035 (60.4%) Spoilt: 19 Quota: 840 Turnout: 5,054

=== Waterford No. 3 ===
Waterford No. 3: 5 seats
Party	Candidate	FPv%	Count									
Party	Candidate	FPv%	1	2	3	4	5	6	7	8	9	10
Waterford People's Party	Martin O'Regan*		889									
Fianna Fáil	Tom Browne*		653	665	672	678	698	705	731			
Workers' Party	Paddy Gallagher*		546	594	604	610	622	739				
Fianna Fáil	Brian Swift*		471	499	508	513	519	527	552	595	772	
Labour	Brian O'Shea		437	450	453	460	477	485	506	585	610	625
Fine Gael	Maurice Cummins*		398	407	408	440	510	512	540	570	594	614
Fianna Fáil	Paddy Kenneally		226	230	232	234	241	242	267	276		
Independent	Paudie Burke		188	202	211	215	220	230	257			
Independent	William Jones		164	169	175	178	182	188				
Workers' Party	Martin Kennedy		154	162	167	168	171					
Fine Gael	Gerry O'Mahoney		110	113	116	144						
Fine Gael	Mary O'Halloran		93	96	96							
Independent	John Lanigan		43	58								
Independent	Paud Sweeney		4	6								
Electorate: 8,263 Valid: 4,382 (53.41%) Spoilt: 31 Quota: 731 Turnout: 4,413
