= Gerry McLoughlin =

Irish rugby union player

Gerard Anthony Joseph McLoughlin (born 11 June 1952 in Limerick) is a former member of the Ireland national rugby union team.

== Rugby career ==
McLoughlin played club rugby for Shannon and Munster. He was part of the Munster team that beat the All Blacks 12 to 0 at Thomond Park in Limerick in 1978. He played for Ireland, scoring the defining try in their 1982 triple crown win, their first since 1949. He also went on the 1983 British and Irish Lions tour to New Zealand.

== Political career ==
McLoughlin was elected to the Limerick City Council in 2004 as an independent but joined the Labour Party in 2006. In 2012 he was elected mayor of Limerick.

== Personal life ==
McLoughlin's daughter Orla was also elected to the Limerick City Council for the Labour Party in 2009. Although she ran again in 2014, she was not reelected. His son, Fionn McLoughlin, is also a rugby player.
