= Democratic Socialist Party (Ireland) =

Irish political party, 1982–1990

Democratic Socialist Party An Páirtí Sóisialach Daonlathach
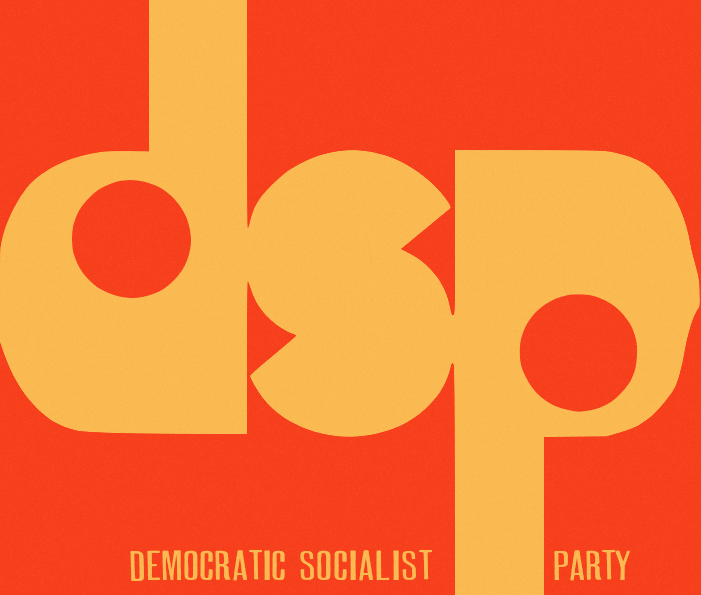
- Founder and leader: Jim Kemmy
- Founded: 1982
- Dissolved: 1990
- Merger of: Limerick Socialist Organisation; Socialist Party of Ireland
- Merged into: Labour Party
- Ideology: Democratic socialism Secularism; Anti-nationalism
- Political position: Left-wing

The Democratic Socialist Party (DSP) was a small left-wing political party in Ireland. The party was formed by a merger of the Socialist Party of Ireland with Jim Kemmy's Limerick Socialist Organisation. Kemmy was a member of Dáil Éireann who left the Labour Party in 1972. A number of members of the British and Irish Communist Organisation also joined the party.

== History ==
The Democratic Socialist Party was founded in 1982. It had a political stance to the left of the Labour Party, and was strongly opposed to nationalist positions regarding Northern Ireland. Journalist Brian Trench claimed the DSP shared "the anti-republicanism and economism" of the 1980s Workers' Party, despite disagreeing with the WP on other issues. In 1983 the party made submissions to the New Ireland Forum reflecting its non-nationalist position. It also held a strongly secularist position, opposing the influence of the Catholic Church on issues such as contraception, divorce and abortion.

The party never held any Dáil seats other than Kemmy's seat in Limerick East. Outside of Limerick City its membership was very small, although its positions on Northern Ireland and the Catholic Church attracted members of the British and Irish Communist Organisation (BICO) to it. In 1982, the Socialist Party of Ireland joined.

It merged with the Labour Party in May 1990. Many of the BICO members in the party later joined the Democratic Left when that party was established in 1992.

A number of former members became successful electorally with the Labour Party such as Limerick TD Jan O'Sullivan, Dublin TD Michael Conaghan who was Lord Mayor of Dublin in 2004 and TD Eamonn Maloney. The historian John de Courcy Ireland was also a member of the party and a candidate in the 1984 European elections.

== List of the DSP electoral candidates ==
Election	Candidate	Constituency	1st Pref. votes	%
February 1982 general election	Jim Kemmy	Limerick East	6,502	13.7
1982 Dublin West by-election	Michael Conaghan	Dublin West	667	1.6
November 1982 general election
November 1982 general election	Garry O'Sullivan	Cork South-Central	369	0.8
November 1982 general election	Philip O'Connor	Dublin North-Central	224	0.6
November 1982 general election	Séamus Rattigan	Dublin South-Central	303	0.7
November 1982 general election	Denis O'Connor	Dublin South	479	0.9
November 1982 general election	Michael Conaghan	Dublin West	476	1.0
November 1982 general election	John de Courcy Ireland	Dún Laoghaire	1,036	2.1
November 1982 general election	Jim Kemmy	Limerick East	4,125	8.7
1984 European Parliament election	John de Courcy Ireland	Dublin	5,350	1.9
1987 general election
1987 general election	Philip O'Connor	Dublin North-Central	681	1.6
1987 general election	Eamonn Maloney	Dublin South-West	223	0.5
1987 general election	Michael Conaghan	Dublin West	600	1.2
1987 general election	Jim Kemmy	Limerick East	5,920	11.9
1989 general election
1989 general election	Michael Conaghan	Dublin West	668	1.4
1989 general election	Jim Kemmy	Limerick East	9,168	19.8

== General election results ==
Election	Seats won	±	Position	First Pref votes	%	Government	Leader
Nov. 1982	0 / 166	Steady	None	7,012	0.4%	No Seats	Jim Kemmy
1987	1 / 166	▲1	▲6th	7,424	0.4%	Opposition	Jim Kemmy
1989	1 / 166	Steady	6th	9,836	0.6%	Opposition	Jim Kemmy

== Local elections ==
The party ran nine candidates in the 1985 local elections in Limerick Corporation (4 candidates, 3 elected), Dublin Corporation (3 candidates), and Dublin County Council (one candidate each in Dún Laoghaire–Rathdown and Dublin–Belgard).

Election	Seats won	±	First-pref. votes	%
1985	3	▲3	5,472	▲0.4%
