= Limerick City Council =

Former local authority for Limerick city in Ireland (1899–2014)

Limerick City Council Comhairle Cathrach Luimnigh

Type
- Type: City council of Limerick

History
- Established: 1 April 1899
- Disbanded: 1 June 2014
- Preceded by: Grand Jury
- Succeeded by: Limerick City and County Council
- Seats: 17

Elections
- Last election: 5 June 2009

Meeting place
- City Hall, Limerick

Limerick City Council (Irish: Comhairle Cathrach Luimnigh) was the local authority of the city of Limerick in Ireland. The council had 17 elected members. The head of the council had the title of mayor. Limerick City Council was the smallest local government area in Ireland by area (20.35 km^{2}) and 30th (out of 34 authorities) in terms of population. It was abolished in 2014 when the Local Government Reform Act 2014 was implemented. It was succeeded by Limerick City and County Council.

== History ==
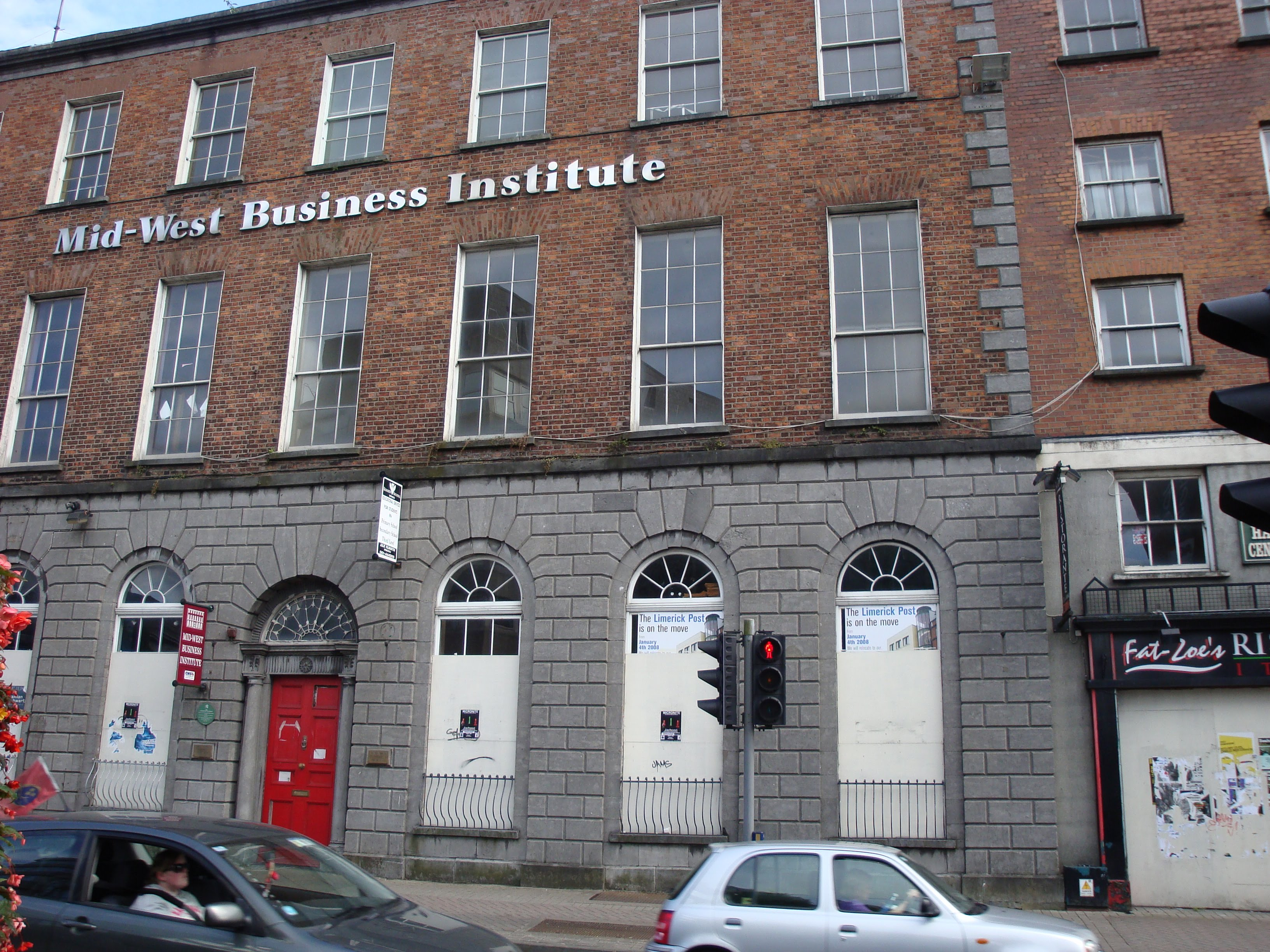
Old Limerick Town Hall 1847–1990

The area that was governed by the council

The city of Limerick received its Charter of Incorporation from John, Lord of Ireland in 1197. Its governing authority was then known as Limerick Corporation. The first Mayor of Limerick was Adam Sarvant. Between 1197 and 1651, Limerick City Council was dominated by English settlers.

The period between 1651 and 1656 was a break in the existence of Limerick Corporation. This came about by the surrender of the Old English settlers to Cromwellian forces in 1651. During this time, the city was administered by a Military Governor. In 1656, the corporation was restored, but under Protestant rule. Catholics who had previously run the corporation were excluded from taking part in local government. There was a brief Catholic restoration of power in 1687 when Lord Tyrconnal, appointed by James II, deposed the Protestant Mayor and his sheriffs and replaced them with a Catholic Mayor, one Catholic and one Protestant sheriff. Limerick Corporation would remain in Catholic control until the Treaty of Limerick in October 1691.

Between 1691 and 1841, Limerick Corporation was ruled by a few powerful families. This period is known both as "The Long Eighteenth Century" and the "Corrupt Corporation". The corrupt corporation was brought to an end after the passing of the Municipal Corporations (Ireland) Act 1840. The act also brought an end to Protestant control of the council.

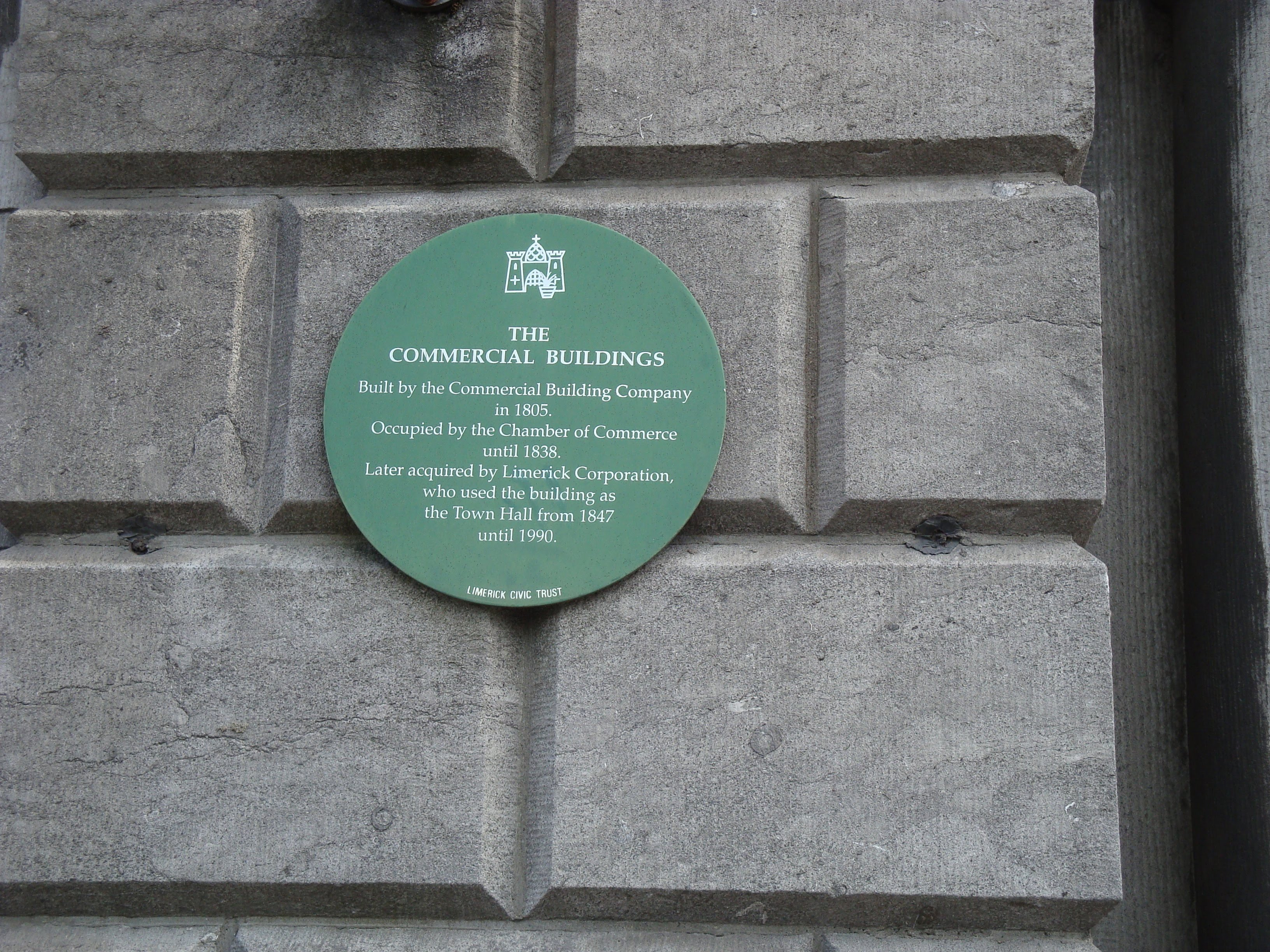
Plaque marking old Limerick Town Hall

In 1899, under the Local Government (Ireland) Act 1898, the municipal borough of Limerick became a county borough.

In 1921, Alderman Maire O'Donovan became the first female mayor of Limerick Corporation. She was appointed mayor while the incumbent of the position was fund-raising for the revolutionary Irish government in the United States. She held the position for seven months, from 21 May 1921 until 30 January 1922.

The Limerick City Management Act 1934 took away much of the day-to-day responsibilities from the mayor and gave it to an appointed City Manager. The powers of the mayor had been greatly reduced since the 1934 Act and the role was mainly ceremonial. The mayor continued to chair city council meetings.

Throughout its history, Limerick City Council has met in several different locations. One of the earliest known locations was the Tholsel building on Mary Street. This building had various uses throughout its history. Before being demolished in the early 20th century, it was in use as a women's gaol. In medieval times, Limerick Corporation moved to the Exchange building on Nicholas Street beside St. Mary's Cathedral. All that remains of the Exchange building is a row of Tuscan columns in the wall surrounding the graveyard of St. Mary's Cathedral. The Exchange was replaced by the new town hall, also known as the Commercial Buildings, on Rutland Street in 1847. The Rutland Street site continued in use until 1990 when Limerick Corporation moved to a new purpose-built City Hall.

Following the enactment of the Local Government Act 2001, Limerick Corporation became Limerick City Council.

On 28 June 2011, the Minister for the Environment, Community and Local Government Phil Hogan announced that Limerick City Council and Limerick County Council would be merged into a single local council. The merger would come into effect following the 2014 local elections, at which there was a single 2014 Limerick City and County Council election. The first steps in this merger was the appointment of Conn Murray as the dual manager of both Limerick City Council and Limerick County Council. It was abolished in 2014 when the Local Government Reform Act 2014 was implemented. The new authority, Limerick City and County Council, came into being on 1 June 2014.

== Elections ==
Year	FG	Lab	FF	SF	PDs	WP	DSP	Ind.	Total
2009	8	4	1	1	—N/a	0	—N/a	3	17
2004	5	4	2	0	0	0	—N/a	6	17
1999	5	3	6	0	0	0	—N/a	3	17
1991	4	5	2	0	3	1	—N/a	2	17
1985	6	1	5	0	—N/a	0	3	2	17
