= John Gilligan (mayor) =

Politician in Limerick, Ireland

Limerick City and County Councillor
- In office May 2014 – May 2019
- Constituency: Limerick City North

Limerick City Councillor
- In office June 1991 – May 2014
- Constituency: Limerick East

Personal details
- Born: Limerick, Ireland
- Political party: Independent

John Gilligan is a former independent politician and was Mayor of Limerick, Ireland, from 2008 to 2009. He was the first independent (non-party) politician to be mayor of limerick since 1962.

He was elected in successive elections for the Limerick No. 2 electoral area and subsequently the Limerick East electoral area, from 1991. He has also stood for election to Dáil Éireann in the Limerick East constituency.

Gilligan and Sinn Féin councillor Maurice Quinlivan were the only councillors on Limerick City Council to oppose the Household charge. Both men refused to pay the charge, and Gilligan spoke at a number of Campaign Against Home and Water Taxes protests.

In mid-2018 he announced his decision not to not seek re-election in the 2019 Limerick City and County Council election.
