= 1985 Irish local elections =

Nationwide local authority elections

- 20 June 1985
- Turnout: 58.98% ▼4.62pp
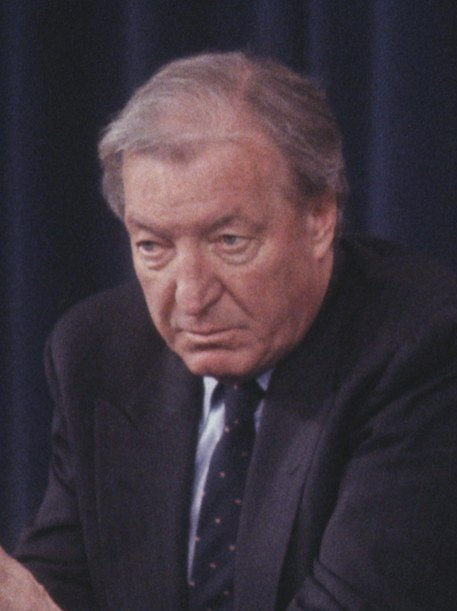

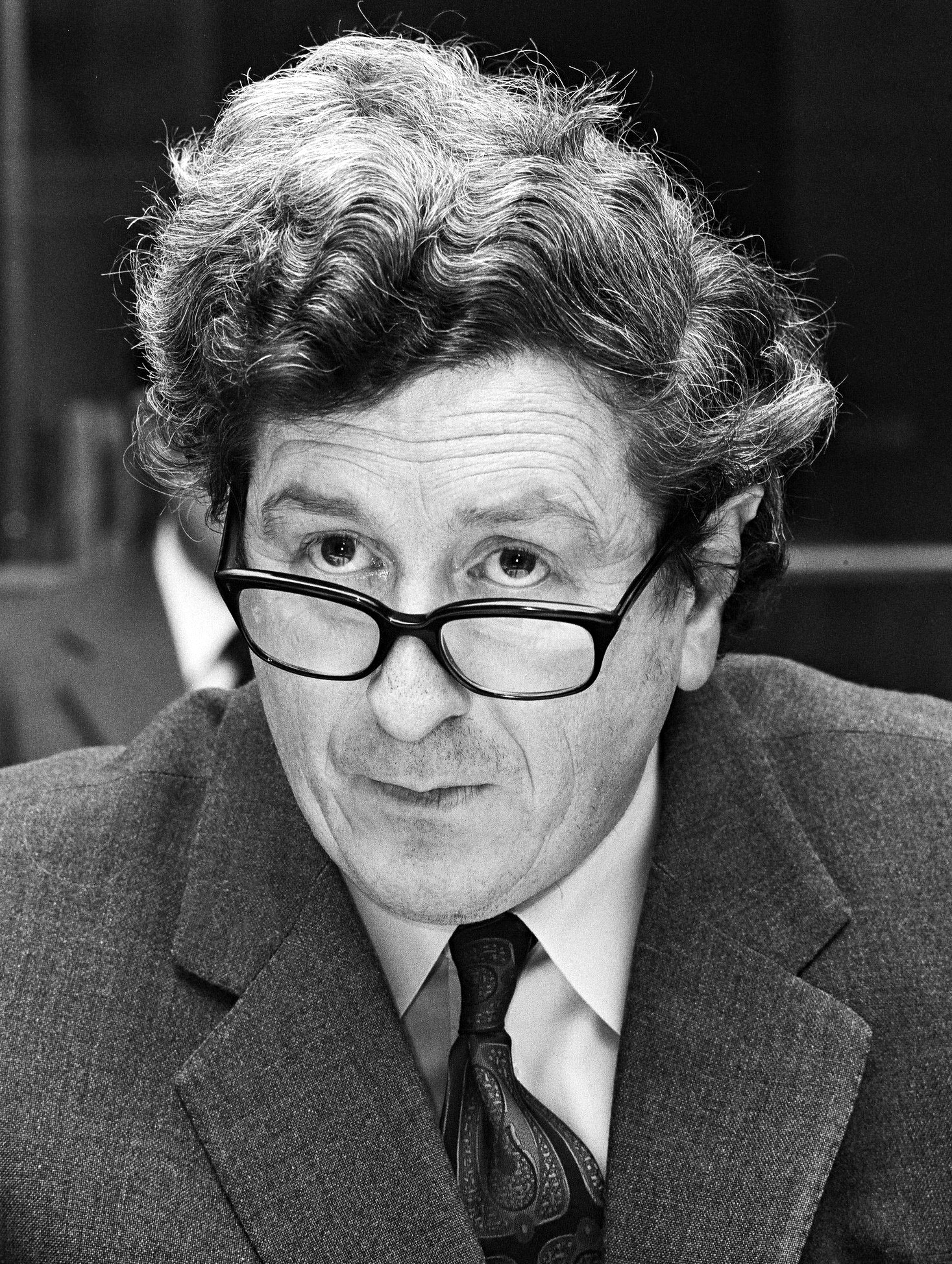

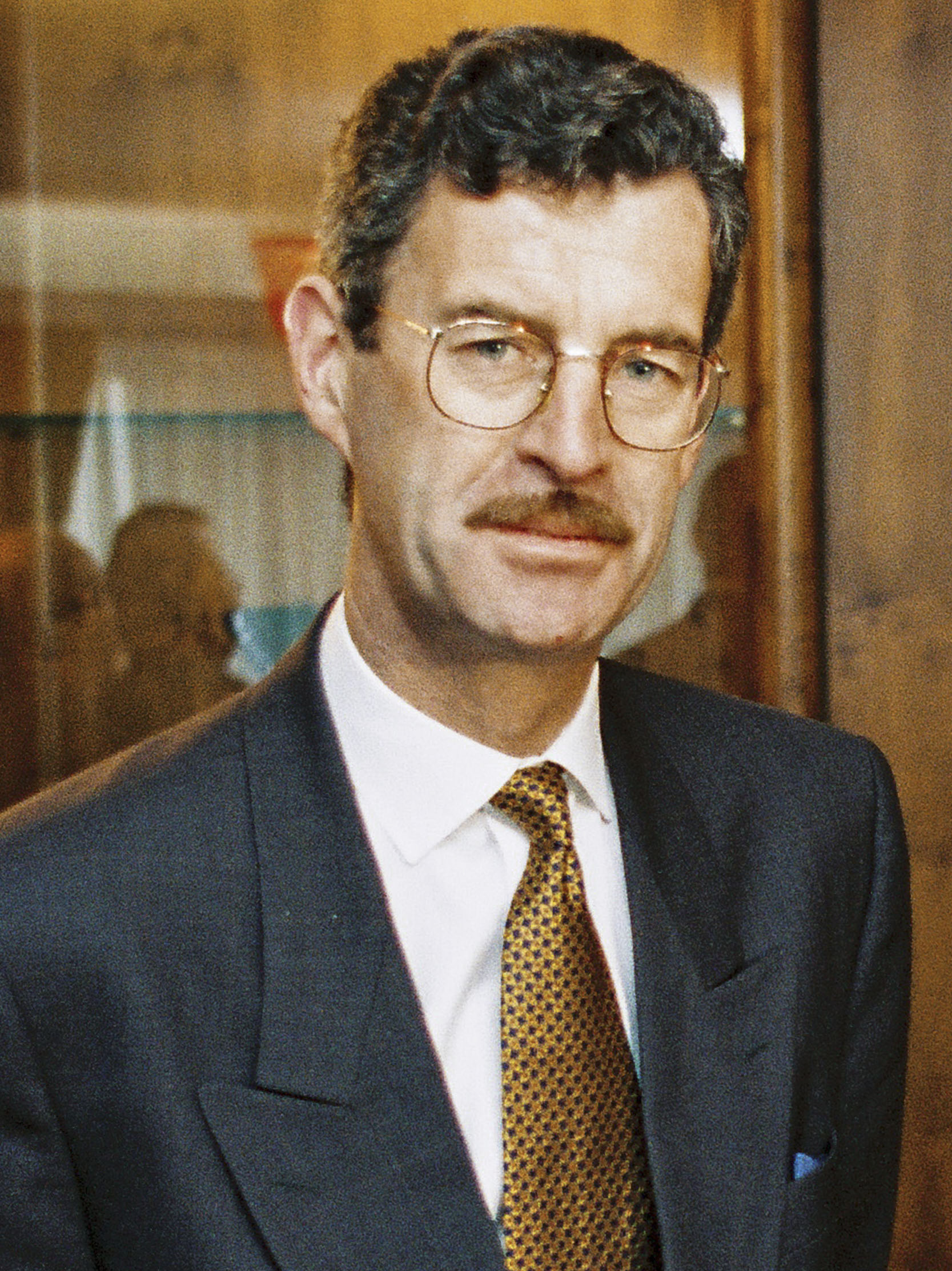

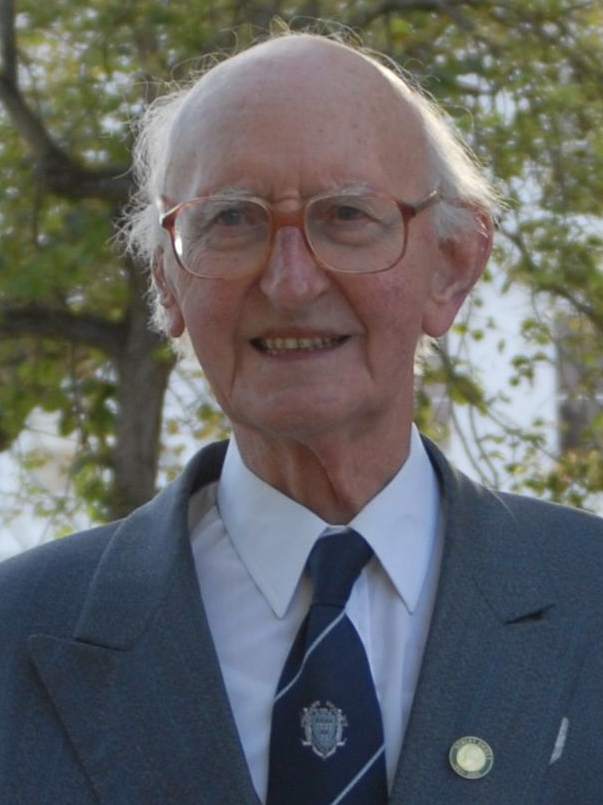

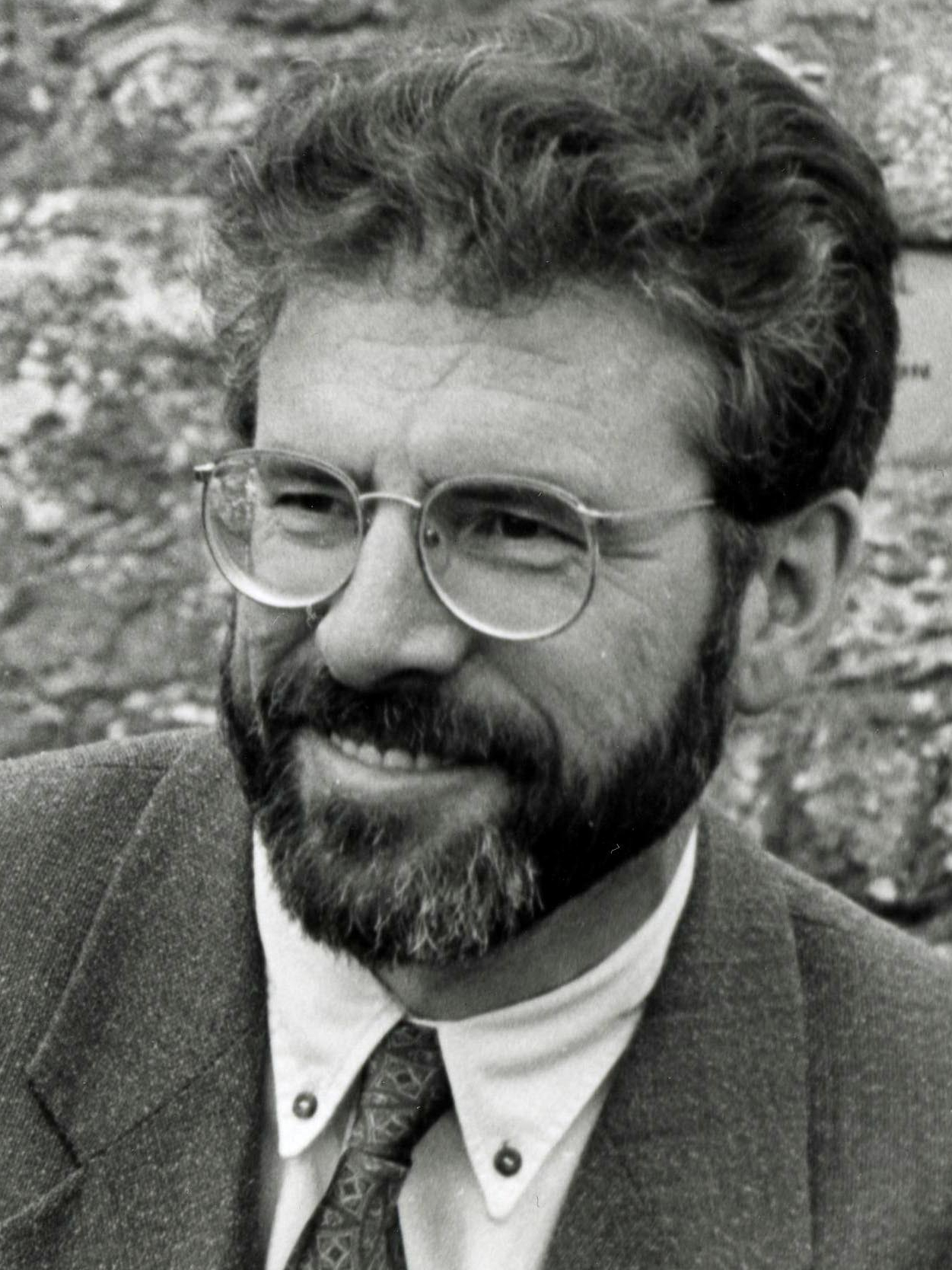

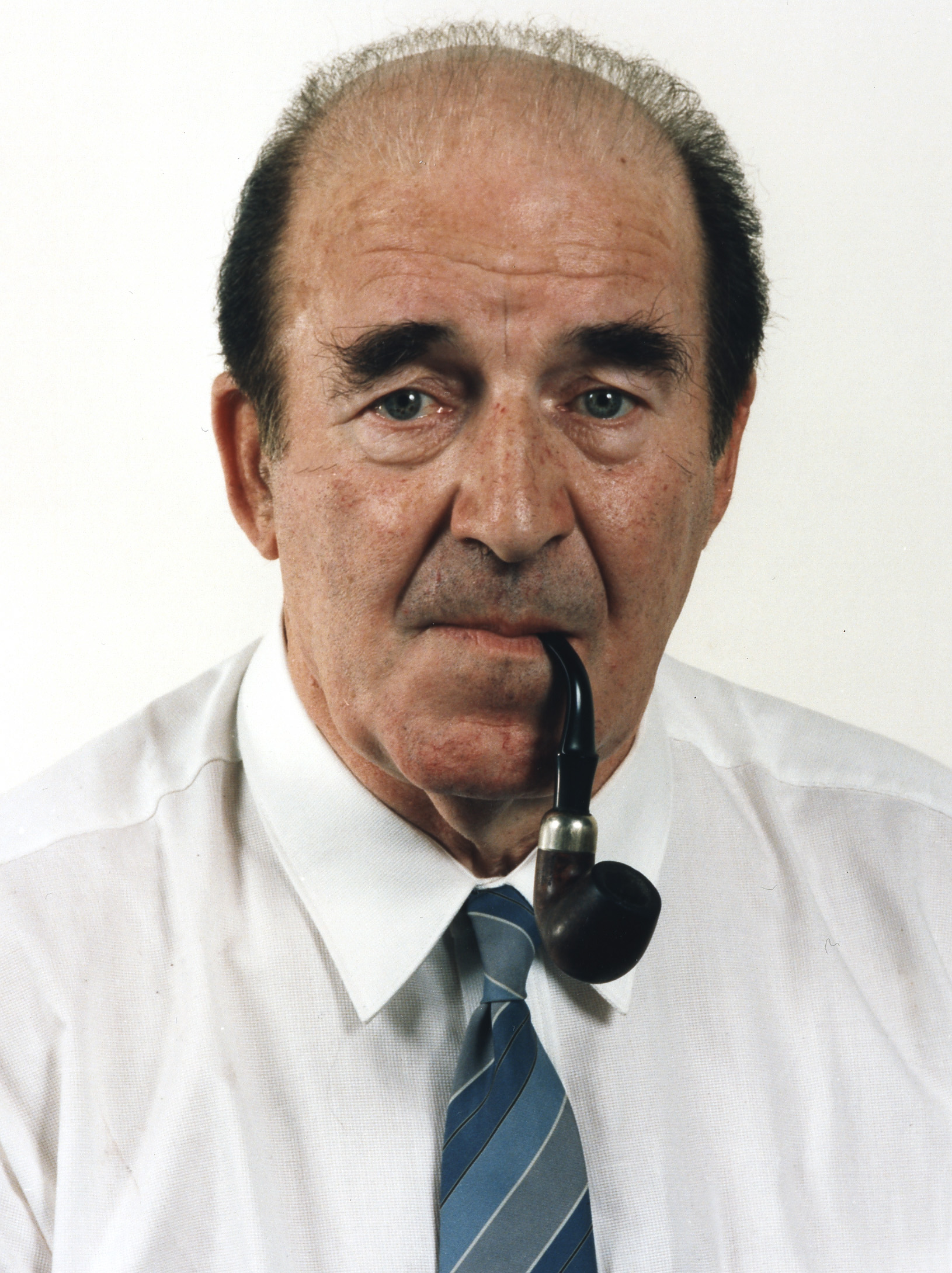
	First party	Second party	Third party
Leader	Charles Haughey	Garret FitzGerald	Dick Spring
Party	Fianna Fáil	Fine Gael	Labour
Leader since	7 December 1979	1 July 1977	1 November 1982
Seats won	441	287	60
Seat change	▲113	▼5	▼15
Popular vote	648,070	422,045	109,681
Percentage	45.6%	29.7%	7.9%
Swing	▲6.5%	▼5.4%	▼4.2%
	Fourth party	Fifth party	Sixth party
Leader	Tomás Mac Giolla	Gerry Adams	Neil Blaney
Party	Workers' Party	Sinn Féin	Independent Fianna Fáil
Leader since	14 October 1962	13 November 1983	1972
Last election		N/A
Seats won	20	10	6
Seat change	▲13	▼1	▲2
Popular vote	43,006	46,391	11073
Percentage	3.0%	3.3%	0.8%
Swing	▲0.3%	▲1.7%	0.0%

The 1985 Irish local elections were held in all the local government areas on Thursday, 20 June 1985.

There were two tiers of local government areas. The state was divided into local government areas of administrative counties and county boroughs under the Local Government (Ireland) Act 1898. Within administrative counties, there was a second tier in certain areas of boroughs governed by the Municipal Corporations (Ireland) Act 1840 and the 1898 Act, urban districts governed by the 1898 Act, and towns with town commissioners governed by the Towns Improvement (Ireland) Act 1854.

The elections had been postponed from June 1984. This allowed for the enactment of reforms under the Local Government (Reorganisation) Act 1985. Each local government area was divided into local electoral areas (LEAs) to be elected on the electoral system of proportional representation by means of the single transferable vote (PR-STV).

== Administrative changes ==
Under the Local Government (Reorganisation) Act 1985:

- the borough of Galway (which previously had a 12-member borough council) ceased to be part of County Galway and became a county borough with its own 15-member city council.
- County Dublin was divided into three electoral counties: Dublin—Belgard (26 members), Dublin—Fingal (24 members) and Dún Laoghaire–Rathdown (28 members). This was an increase from the 36 seats which had been in Dublin County Council. No separate election was to be held for the borough council of the corporation of Dún Laoghaire, with members elected for designated LEAs in Dún Laoghaire–Rathdown to also be the members of the borough council.
- Dublin City Council was increased from 45 to 52 seats

Two Electoral Area Boundary Commissions proposed changes which were implemented by order of the minister:

- Increases in memberships of councils: Clare (one extra), Cork (two extra), Donegal (one extra), Kerry (one extra), Kildare (four extra), Limerick (one extra), Sligo (one extra) and Wicklow (three extra);
- Galway County Council was reduced from 31 to 30 members.

== Results ==
=== County, city and town council seats ===
Party	Seats	±	1st pref	FPv%	±%
Fianna Fáil	441	▲113	648,070	45.6	+6.5
Fine Gael	287	▼5	422,045	29.7	-5.4
Labour	60	▼15	109,681	7.9	-4.2
Workers' Party	20	▲13	43,006	3.0	+0.8
Sinn Féin	10	▼1	46,391	3.3	+1.7
Independent Fianna Fáil	6	▲2	11,073	0.8	0.0
Democratic Socialist	3	▲3	5,472	0.4	New
Waterford People's Party	1	▲1	1,681	0.1	New
Donegal Progressive Party	1	0	1,506	0.1	0.0
Green	0	0	7,446	0.5	New
Communist	0	0	593	0.0	New
Independent			135,603	9.6	-2.1
Total			1,421,494	100.0	—

Note

Sinn Féin, Independent Fianna Fáil and the Waterford People's Party were not registered political parties.

=== Counties and cities ===
Authority	FF	FG	Lab	WP	SF	Ind/Oth	Total
Carlow	10	7	3			1	21
Cavan	14	10				1	25
Clare	17	8				7	32
Cork City	13	8	5	2		3	31
Cork County	24	19	2	1		2	48
Donegal	11	9			1	8	29
Dublin City	26	13	2	6	1	4	52
Dublin–Belgard	13	8	2	2		1	26
Dublin–Fingal	13	7	3			1	24
Dún Laoghaire–Rathdown	13	11	3	1			28
Galway City	6	5	1	1		2	15
Galway County	17	9				4	30
Kerry	13	7	3			4	27
Kildare	10	7	5			3	25
Kilkenny	11	10	3			2	26
Laois	14	9	1			1	25
Leitrim	10	8				4	22
Limerick City	5	6	1			5	17
Limerick County	18	10					28
Longford	10	9				2	21
Louth	12	8	2		1	3	26
Mayo	15	14				2	31
Meath	17	10				2	29
Monaghan	10	7			1	2	20
North Tipperary	12	6	1			2	21
Offaly	12	6				3	21
Roscommon	13	8				5	26
Sligo	11	9	1			4	25
South Tipperary	14	8	3			1	26
Waterford City	5	4	2	2		2	15
Waterford County	11	10	2				23
Westmeath	13	5	3			2	23
Wexford	11	6	1			3	21
Wicklow	13	5	4	1		1	24
Totals	437	283	58	20	4	81	883

== See also ==
- Local government in the Republic of Ireland
- Category:Irish local government councils
