= Patrick Kennedy (Limerick politician) =

Irish politician and barrister (1941–2020)

Senator
- In office 23 February 1983 – 17 February 1993
- In office 8 October 1981 – 13 May 1982
- Constituency: Administrative Panel

Personal details
- Born: 23 November 1941 Limerick, Ireland
- Died: 21 January 2020 (aged 78) Limerick, Ireland
- Party: Fine Gael; Independent
- Spouse: Loretto Kennedy
- Children: 4

Patrick Kennedy (23 November 1941 – 21 January 2020) was a barrister and Fine Gael politician from Limerick city in Ireland.

A member of Limerick City Council, he was elected Council in 1967 at the age of 29, becoming an Alderman in the process. He was re-elected in subsequent elections before he stood down at the 2014 elections. He was Mayor of Limerick from 1974 to 1975 and from 1985 to 1986. He left Fine Gael about the year 2000, and at the 2004 and 2009 local elections he was re-elected to the city council as an independent candidate. He re-joined Fine Gael in September 2009.

Kennedy stood unsuccessfully as a Fine Gael candidate for Dáil Éireann in the Limerick East constituency at the 1969, 1973, 1977 and February 1982 general elections. He also contested the 2002 general election as an independent.

In 1981, he was elected to the 15th Seanad he won a seat on the Administrative Panel. He was unsuccessful at the 1982 Seanad election. He was returned the following year to the 17th Seanad (again on the Administrative Panel), and held that seat until his defeat at the 1993 Seanad election. He stood again for the Seanad in 1997, but was not re-elected.

He worked as a school teacher in Christian Brothers School Limerick.

In 2015, Kennedy published biographies of Chief Justice Hugh Kennedy (no relation) (Hugh Kennedy: The Great But Neglected Chief Justice) and Liam Cosgrave (Liam Cosgrave: Parliamentarian, Fine Gael Leader, Cabinet Minister and Taoiseach). He also announced plans for several projects, including a book on World War I casualties among Irish barristers.

Kennedy died at University Hospital Limerick on 21 January 2020 following a short illness. He is buried in Mount Saint Oliver's Cemetery, Limerick.
