= Dublin County Council =

Former local government authority for County Dublin in Ireland (1898–1993)

Dublin County Council Comhairle Contae Bhaile Átha Cliath
- County council of County Dublin
- Coat of arms of Dublin County Council

History
- Established: 1898
- Disbanded: 1 January 1994
- Preceded by: Grand Jury
- Succeeded by: Dún Laoghaire–Rathdown County Council; Fingal County Council; South Dublin County Council
- Seats: 78

Elections
- Last election: 1991

Motto
- Irish: Beart do réir ár mbriathar, lit. 'Action to match our speech'

Meeting place
- O'Connell Street, Dublin

Dublin County Council (Irish: Comhairle Contae Bhaile Átha Cliath) was a local authority for the administrative county of County Dublin in Ireland.

== History ==
The county council was established on 1 April 1899 under the Local Government (Ireland) Act 1898 for the administrative county of County Dublin, which succeeded the former judicial county of Dublin except for the portion in the township of Bray, which became part of the administrative county of County Wicklow.

Before 1930, the chair of each rural district council sat as an ex officio member of the council. Rural districts outside of County Dublin were abolished under the Local Government Act 1925. Under the Local Government (Dublin) Act 1930, rural district councils in County Dublin were also abolished and their functions transferred to the Dublin County Council. These were the districts of Balrothery, Celbrige No. 2, Dublin North, Dublin South, and Rathdown No. 1.

Its headquarters were established at 10–11 Parnell Square in 1900 but, due to the cramped conditions, it transferred to 46–49 O'Connell Street, Dublin City in 1975.

In 1985, County Dublin was divided into three electoral counties: Dublin–Belgard (South Dublin from 1991) to the southwest, Dublin–Fingal (Fingal from 1991) to the north, and Dún Laoghaire–Rathdown to the southeast. At the 1985 local election and the 1991 local election, the election was held within these electoral counties.

On 1 January 1994, under the Local Government (Dublin) Act 1993, County Dublin, the County Council and the Corporation of Dún Laoghaire were abolished, and the electoral counties each became administrative counties. Dublin County Council was succeeded by:

- Dún Laoghaire–Rathdown County Council
- Fingal County Council
- South Dublin County Council

The city of Dublin has been administered separately from the county since before the establishment of the county council. Its local authority is Dublin City Council, styled Dublin Corporation until 2002.

The archives of Dublin County Council are held at Fingal Local Studies & Archives.

== Legacy ==
Both the Parnell Square property and the O'Connell Street property were transferred to the Fingal County Council on the abolition of Dublin County Council. These offices were a key location in the events described in the Mahon Tribunal – a tribunal which inquired into re-zoning and planning irregularities in the 1980s in County Dublin.

From 1994 to 2014, the Dublin Regional Authority served as a coordinating body for the area which had been administered by Dublin County Council, as well as that of Dublin City Council. The area is now part of the Eastern and Midland Regional Assembly.

== Motto ==
The motto on its coat of arms was Beart do réir ár mbriathar in Irish which means Action to match our speech.
