= Didier =

Didier is a French masculine given name and surname common throughout the Romance languages. During the 5th century AD, with the Christianisation of ancient pagan names, it became associated with the name Desiderius, related to Latin desiderium – which can be translated as "ardent desire" or "the longed-for".

Notable people with the name include:

== Given name ==
=== A ===
- Didier Agathe (born 1975), French footballer
- Didier Ahadsi (born 1970), Togolese self-taught artist and sculptor
- Didier André (born 1974), French race car driver
- Didier Angibeaud (born 1974), Cameroonian footballer
- Didier Anzieu (1923–1999), French psychoanalyst
- Didier Artzet (born 1963), French former racing driver
- Didier Astruc (born 1946), French chemist
- Didier Auriol (born 1958), French rally driver
- Didier Awadi (born 1969), Senegalese rapper

=== B ===
- Didier Baichère (born 1970), French politician
- Didier Barbelivien (born 1954), French singer-songwriter
- Didier Barra (1590–1656), French painter
- Didier Bellens (1955–2016), Belgian businessman
- Didier Bence (born 1987), Canadian boxer
- Didier Berthet (1962–2023), French Roman Catholic prelate
- Didier Berthod (born 1981), Swiss rock climber and priest
- Didier Beugnies (born 1961), Belgian footballer
- Didier Bezace (1946–2020), French actor
- Samuel Didier Biang (born 1974), Cameroonian footballer and coach
- Didier Bienaimé (1961–2004), French actor
- Didier Bigo (born 1956), French academic
- Didier Bionaz (born 2000), Italian biathlete
- Didier Bizimana (born 1975), Burundian footballer
- Didier Blanc (born 1984), French ski mountaineer
- Didier Bocquet (born 1957), French musician
- Didier Borotra (1937–2024), French politician
- Didier Bouanga (born 1995), French footballer
- Didier Boubé (born 1957), French modern pentathlete
- Didier Boulaud (born 1950), French politician
- Didier Bourdon (born 1959), French actor, screenwriter and film director
- Didier Bourrier (1955–1987), French cyclist
- Didier Bouvet (born 1961), French alpine skier
- Didier Breton (born 1953), British businessman
- Didier Brossou (born 1989), Ivorian footballer
- Didier Brunner (born 1948), French film producer
- Didier Budimbu (born 1901), Congolese politician
- Didier Burkhalter (born 1960), Swiss Federal Councillor from 2009 to 2017

=== C ===
- Didier Cabestany (1969–2020), France rugby league & union footballer
- Didier of Cahors (0580–0655), Merovingian official
- Didier Camberabero (born 1961), French rugby union player
- Didier Casadeï (born 1971), French rugby union player
- Didier Casimiro (born 1966), Russian government official
- Didier Casnati (born 1980), Italian musician
- Didier Van Cauwelaert (born 1960), French author of Belgian descent
- Didier Chambaron (born 1971), French professional football manager
- Didier Chaparro (born 1987), Colombian cyclist
- Didier Chesneau, French guitarist
- Didier Chouat (1945–2014), French politician
- Didier Christophe (born 1956), French footballer
- Didier Codorniou (born 1958), France international rugby union player
- Didier Comès (1942–2013), Belgian comics artist
- Didier Conrad (born 1959), French comics artist and writer
- Didier Cossin (born 1964), Swiss-French economist
- Didier Cottaz (born 1967), French racing driver
- Didier Couécou (born 1944), French footballer
- Didier de Chaffoy de Courcelles (born 1953), Belgian scientist and businessman
- Didier Courrèges (born 1960), French equestrian
- Didier Courtois (born 1967), French ice dancer
- Didier Crettenand (born 1986), Swiss football midfielder
- Didier Cuche (born 1974), Swiss alpine skier

=== D ===
- Didier Dacko (born 1967), Malian general and diplomat
- Didier Daeninckx (born 1949), French author and left-wing politician
- Didier Dagueneau (1956–2008), French winemaker
- Didier van Damme (born 1929), European Adviser and also composer
- Didier Danio (born 1962), French footballer
- Didier Daurat (1891–1969), French aviator
- Didier Decoin (born 1945), French screenwriter and writer
- Didier Défago (born 1977), Swiss alpine skier
- Didier Delgado (born 1992), Colombian footballer
- Didier Delsalle (born 1957), French pilot
- Didier Demazière (born 1950), French sociologist
- Didier Deschamps (born 1968), French footballer and manager
- Didier Desprez (born 1999), French association football player
- Didier Detchénique (born 1972), French high jumper
- Didier Dheedene (born 1972), Belgian footballer
- Didier Dhennin (born 1961), French eventing rider
- Didier Diderot (1685–1759), French craftsman
- Didier Dietschi, Swiss dentist
- Didier Digard (born 1986), French footballer
- Didier Dinart (born 1977), French handball player
- Didier Dogley (born 1964), Seychellois politician
- Didier Domi (born 1978), French footballer and coach
- Didier Drogba (born 1978), Ivorian footballer
- Didier Dubois (athlete) (born 1957), French sprinter
- Didier Dubois (mathematician) (born 1952), French mathematician
- Didier Dubucq (born 1850), Belgian cartoonist and journalist

=== E ===
- Didier Eribon (born 1953), French author and philosopher
- Didier Ernst (born 1971), Belgian footballer
- Didier Etumba (born 1955), Chief of General Staff of the Armed Forces of the Democratic Republic of Congo

=== F ===
- Didier Faivre-Pierret (born 1965), French cyclist
- Didier Falise (born 1961), Belgian triple jumper
- Didier Fassin (born 1955), French anthropologist
- Didier Flamand (born 1947), French actor
- Didier Flament (born 1951), French fencer
- Didier François (born 1969), Belgian nyckelharpa performer
- Didier François (journalist) (born 1960), French journalist
- Didier Frenay (born 1966), Belgian footballer
- Didier Fuentes (born 2005), Colombian baseball player

=== G ===
- Didier Le Gac (born 1965), French politician
- Didier Gailhaguet (born 1953), French figure skater, coach and official
- Didier Gallet (born 1945), French rower
- Didier Gamerdinger (born 1959), Monegasque windsurfer
- Didier Garcia (born 1964), French cyclist
- Didier Georgakakis (born 1966), French political scientist
- Didier Gigon (born 1968), Swiss footballer
- Didier Gonzales (born 1960), French politician
- Didier Gopaul (born 1983), Mauritian footballer
- Didier Lecour Grandmaison (1889–1917), French Pilot
- Didier Guérin (born 1950), French editor
- Didier Guillaume (1959–2025), French politician
- Didier Guillemot (born 1960), French physician and researcher
- Didier Le Guillou (born 1960), French middle-distance runner
- Didier Guzzoni (born 1970), Swiss computer scientist and inventor of Siri

=== H ===
- Didier Hassoux (born 1963), French investigative journalist and political writer
- Didier Haudepin (born 1951), French actor, film producer, screenwriter and director
- Didier Hauss, French glider
- Didier Henriette (born 1985), French cyclist
- Didier Henry (born 1953), French baritone
- Didier Hernández (born 1979), Cuban Artist. Singer Songwriter
- Didier Hesse (1901–1974), French sports shooter
- Didier van der Hove (born 1966), Belgian-Colombian actor
- Didier Hoyer (born 1961), French canoeist

=== J ===
- Didier Julia (born 1934), French politician and philosopher

=== K ===
- Didier Kadio (born 1990), Ivorian footballer
- Didier Kamanzi (born 1994), Burundi–born Rwandan actor
- Didier Kaphagawani, Malawian philosopher
- Didier Kavumbagu (born 1983), Burundian footballer
- Didier Kiki (born 1995), Beninese sprinter
- Didier Knayer (born 1957), French footballer
- Didier Ya Konan (born 1984), Ivorian footballer
- Didier Koré (born 1989), Ivorian footballer
- Didier Kougbenya (born 1995), Togolese footballer

=== L ===
- Didier Lamont (born 1956), Belgian alpine skier
- Didier Lang (born 1970), French footballer
- Didier Lapeyronnie (1956–2020), French sociologist
- Didier Lavergne (born 1950), French make-up artist
- Didier Lebaud (born 1954), French cyclist
- Didier Lebri (born 1989), Ivorian footballer
- Didier Leclair (born 1967), Canadian author
- Didier Lefèvre (1957–2007), French photojournalist
- Didier Lemaire (born 1975), French politician
- Didier Lestrade (born 1958), French author and advocate
- Didier Levallet (born 1944), French musician
- Didier Lockwood (1956–2018), French jazz violinist
- Didier Lombard (born 1942), French businessman
- Didier Ben Loulou (born 1958), Franco-Israeli photographer
- Didier Lourenço (1968–2023), Spanish artist
- Didier Lucchesi (born 1970), French conductor

=== M ===
- Didier Malherbe (born 1943), French musician
- Didier Malige (born 1948), French hairstylist
- Didier Mandelli (born 1964), French politician
- Didier Marouani (born 1953), French composer and musician
- Didier Martel (born 1971), French footballer
- Didier Martin (born 1956), French politician
- Didier Masson (1886–1950), French aviator
- Didier Mathus (born 1952), French politician
- Didier Mazengu, Congolese politician
- Didier Timothée Mbai (born 1985), Chadian footballer
- Didier Mejía (born 1941), Mexican sprinter
- Didier Menard (born 1972), American-born Haitian footballer
- Didier Merchán (born 1999), Colombian cyclist
- Didier Meslard (1896–1963), French cyclist
- Didier Michaud-Daniel (born 1958), French business executive
- Didier Migaud (born 1952), French politician
- Didier Mollard (born 1969), French ski jumper
- Didier Moreno (born 1991), Colombian footballer
- Didier Moret (born 1975), Swiss ski mountaineer
- Didier Motchane (1931–2017), French politician
- Didier Mouly (1951–2023), French politician
- Didier Moureau (1930–2023), French rower
- Didier Mouron (born 1958), Canadian artist
- Didier Mumengi (born 1962), Congolese journalist
- Didier Munduteguy (born 1953), French offshore sailor and navigator
- Didier Munyaneza (born 1998), Rwandan cyclist

=== N ===
- Didier Ndong (born 1994), Gabonese footballer
- Didier Neumann (born 1977), French footballer
- Didier Niquet (born 1949), French canoeist
- Didier Njewel (born 1983), Cameroonian footballer
- Didier Notheaux (1948–2021), French football coach

=== O ===
- Didier Lutundula Okito, Congolese politician
- Didier Ollé-Nicolle (born 1961), French footballer and manager
- Didier Opertti (born 1937), Uruguayan political figure and lawyer
- Didier Otokoré (born 1969), Ivorian footballer
- Didier Ottinger (born 1957), French museum curator, art critic and author
- Didier Ouénangaré (1953–2006), Central African Republic film director
- Didier Ovono (born 1983), Gabonese footballer

=== P ===
- Didier Paass (born 1982), Togolese footballer
- Didier Païs (born 1983), French freestyle wrestler
- Didier Palleti (1587–1658), 17th-century Roman Catholic bishop
- Didier Parakian (born 1964), French businessman and politician
- Didier Paris (born 1954), French politician
- Didier Pasgrimaud (1966–2021), French cyclist
- Didier Pasquette (born 1950), French tightrope walker
- Didier Philippe (born 1961), French footballer
- Didier Pillet (1948–2026), French journalist
- Didier Pironi (1952–1987), French racing driver
- Didier Pitre (1883–1934), Canadian ice hockey player
- Didier Pittet (born 1957), Swiss infectiologue and epidemiologist
- Didier Plaschy (born 1973), Swiss alpine skier
- Didier Poidyaliwane (1966–2022), New Caledonian politician
- Didier Poissant (1923–2021), French sailor
- Didier Pollefeyt (born 1965), Belgian theologian

=== Q ===
- Didier Queloz (born 1966), Swiss astronomer
- Didier Quentin (born 1946), French politician
- Didier Quillot (born 1959), French businessman

=== R ===
- Didier Rabat (born 1966), French footballer
- Didier de Radiguès (born 1958), Belgian motorcycle racer
- Didier Raoult (born 1952), French biology researcher
- Didier Ratsiraka (1936–2021), President of Madagascar from 1975 to 1993 and 1997 to 2002
- Didier Reinoso (born 2007), Cuban footballer
- Didier of Rennes, 7th century bishop
- Didier Reynders (born 1958), Belgian politician
- Didier Rimaud (1922–2003), French Jesuit, composer and poet
- Didier Robert (born 1964), French politician
- Didier Gomes Da Rosa (born 1969), French football manager
- Didier Rous (born 1970), French cyclist
- Didier Roustan (1957–2024), French sports journalist
- Didier Roux (born 1955), Director of Research and Innovation at Saint-Gobain
- Didier Ruef (born 1961), Swiss documentary photographer
- Didier Rykner (born 1961), French journalist

=== S ===
- Didier de Saint-Jaille (died 1536), French nobleman
- Didier Sandre (born 1946), French actor
- Didier Santini (born 1968), French footballer
- Didier Lupi Second (c. 1520 – after 1559), French composer
- Didier Seeuws (born 1965), Belgian civil servant and diplomat
- Didier Segers (born 1965), Belgian football player
- Didier Seguret (born 1958), French equestrian
- Didier Sellos (born 1957), French chess player
- Didier Sénac (born 1958), French footballer and coach
- Didier Yamit Lugo Sichaca (born 1991), Colombian artistic gymnast
- Didier Simane (born 1996), New Caledonian footballer
- Didier Ekanza Simba (born 1969), Congolese footballer
- Didier Six (born 1954), French football manager
- Didier Sornette (born 1957), French researcher
- Didier Squiban (born 1959), French pianist and composer
- Didier Stainier (born 1963), Belgian-American developmental geneticist
- Didier Stil (born 1964), French bobsledder

=== T ===
- Didier Talla (born 1989), Cameroonian footballer
- Didier Talpain (born 1960), French conductor and diplomat
- Didier Tamayo (born 1939), Colombian fencer
- Didier Tarquin (born 1967), French cartoonist and comic book writer
- Didier Tayou (born 1988), Cameroonian footballer
- Didier Theys (born 1956), Belgian racing driver
- Didier Thimothée (born 1970), French footballer
- Didier Tholot (born 1964), French football manager
- Didier Toffolo (born 1959), French footballer and manager
- Didier La Torre (born 2002), Peruvian footballer
- Didier Trono (born 1956), Swiss virologist
- Didier Truchot (born 1946), French business executive
- Didier Léandre Tsiajotso, Malagasy politician

=== V ===
- Didier Vanoverschelde (born 1952), French cyclist
- Didier Robert de Vaugondy (1723–1786), French geographer
- Didier Vavasseur (born 1961), French sprint canoer
- Didier Vermeersch (born 1953), Belgian rower
- Didier Vermeiren (born 1951), Belgian artist
- Didier Virvaleix (born 1966), French cyclist
- Didier Van Vlaslaer (born 1955), French cyclist

=== W ===
- Didier Willefert (born 1964), French equestrian
- Didier William (born 1983), Haitian visual artist

=== X ===
- Didier Xhaet (born 1955), Belgian alpine skier

=== Z ===
- Didier Lamkel Zé (born 1996), Cameroonian footballer
- Didier Zokora (born 1980), Ivorian footballer

== Surname ==
- Aurore Didier (born 1978), French archaeologist
- Béatrice Didier (born 1935), French literary critic
- Bob Didier (born 1949), American baseball player
- Candice Didier (born 1988), French figure skater
- Cécile Didier (1888–1975), French actress
- Charles Didier (1805–1864), Swiss writer and poet
- Christian Didier (1944–2015), Killer of René Bousquet
- Christophe Didier (1915–1978), Luxembourgish cyclist
- Clint Didier (born 1959), American football player and politician
- Édouard Didier (born 1939), Luxembourgish fencer
- Elaine Didier (born 1948), American director of the Gerald R. Ford Library and Museum
- Eugene L. Didier (1838–1913), American writer
- Évelyne Didier (born 1948), French politician
- Francis Didier (born 1949), French karateka
- Geoff Didier (born 1959), Australian rugby union player
- Geoffroy Didier (born 1976), French lawyer and politician
- Gwendoline Didier (born 1986), French figure skater
- Heinrich Didier, American newspaper editor
- Henry de Sainct-Didier, 16th century fencing master
- John Peter Didier (1753–1823), American politician
- Josiah Didier (born 1993), American ice hockey player
- Laurent Didier (born 1984), Luxembourgish racing cyclist
- Lucas Didier (born 2003), French para table tennis player
- Lucien Didier (born 1950), Luxembourgish cyclist
- Mel Didier (1927–2017), American baseball player, scout manager and executive
- Miguel Castillo Didier (born 1934), Chilean hellenist, translator, scholar and musicologist
- Raymond Didier (1920–1978), American football coach, baseball coach and college athletics administrator
- Richard Didier (born 1961), French senior civil servant
- Robert Didier (1885–1977), French entomologist
- Samwise Didier (born 1971), American video game art director
- Ugo Didier (born 2001), French Paralympic swimmer
