= Desiderio =

Desiderio is both a surname and a given name in Italian, Spanish and Portuguese (Desidério), derived from the Latin Desiderius. A diminutive of the name is Desi.

Notable people with the name include:

== Surname ==
- Alberto Desiderio (born 1973), Italian javelin thrower
- Aniello Desiderio (born 1971), Italian guitarist and professor
- Carlos Desiderio Peucelle (1908–1990), Argentine football player
- Christina Desiderio (born 2000), American artistic gymnast
- Fábio André Tavares Desidério (born 2001), known as Fábio Tavares, Portuguese footballer
- Mario Desiderio (born 1938), Argentine footballer
- Monsù Desiderio, painter in Italy
- Paul Desiderio (born 1997), Filipino basketball player
- Reginald B. Desiderio (1918–1950), soldier in the United States Army
  - Desiderio Army Airfield, Pyeongtaek, South Korea, named after Reginald B. Desiderio
- Robert Desiderio (born 1951), American actor
- Vincent Desiderio (born 1955), American realist painter

== Given name ==
- Desiderio Arias, Dominican Republic soldier and caudillo
- Desiderio Alberto Arnaz II (1894–1973), Cuban politician and the father of Desi Arnaz
- Desiderio "Desi" Arnaz (1917–1986), Cuban American actor, musician and bandleader
- Desiderio "Desi" Arnaz Jr. (born 1953), American actor and musician
- Desidério Costa (born 1934), Angolan politician
- Desiderio Garufo (born 1987), Italian footballer
- Desiderio Hernández (born 1887), Cuban baseball player
- Desiderio Hernández Xochitiotzin (1922–2007), Mexican artist
- Desiderio Lebron (born 1949), Dominican Republic judoka
- Desiderio Macías Silva (1922–1995), Mexican poet and medical doctor
- Desiderio Medina (1919–1986), Chilean footballer
- Desidério Murcho (born 1965), Portuguese philosopher, professor, and writer
- Desiderio Navarro, Cuban art, culture and literature critic
- Desiderio Passali (born 1947), Italian doctor and professor
- Desiderio Scaglia (1567–1639), Italian cardinal and bishop
- Desiderio da Settignano (c. 1430–1464), Italian sculptor
- Desiderio Spreti (1414–1474), Italian historian
- Desiderio Suson, Filipino serviceman and Medal of Valor recipient
- José Desiderio Valverde (1822–1903), Dominican military figure and politician

== See also ==
- Desiderio Tello, a municipality and village in Argentina
- Desiderius (given name)
- Didier (disambiguation)
- Dizier
