= 1985–86 Belgian First Division =

83rd season of top-tier football in Belgium

Belgian First Division
- Season: 1985–86

Statistics of Belgian League in season 1985–86.

== Overview ==
Location of teams in Belgian First Division 1985–86

It was performed by 18 teams, and R.S.C. Anderlecht won the championship, while K. Waterschei S.V. Thor Genk & Lierse S.K. were relegated.

The top two teams, Anderlecht and Club Brugge, finished level on points (though Anderlecht had a superior goal difference) and it was decided that a two-legged championship playoff would take place – a situation which had not occurred in Belgian football since 1928–29. Both of these 'test matches' were drawn: 1–1 in Brussels and 2–2 in Bruges, with Anderlecht coming back from two goals behind and holding off a late onslaught from the opposition to claim the title on the away goals rule.

== League standings ==
Pos	Team	Pld	W	D	L	GF	GA	GD	Pts	Qualification or relegation
1	R.S.C. Anderlecht	34	22	8	4	84	33	+51	52	Qualified for 1986–87 European Cup
2	Club Brugge K.V.	34	22	8	4	78	34	+44	52	Qualified for 1986–87 European Cup Winners' Cup
3	Standard Liège	34	15	12	7	57	29	+28	42	Qualified for 1986–87 UEFA Cup
4	K.A.A. Gent	34	15	11	8	51	38	+13	41	Qualified for 1986–87 UEFA Cup
5	K.S.K. Beveren	34	15	10	9	51	37	+14	40	Qualified for 1986–87 UEFA Cup
6	R.F.C. de Liège	34	15	9	10	43	35	+8	39	
7	K. Beerschot V.A.C.	34	12	13	9	43	44	−1	37	
8	K.S.V. Waregem	34	14	7	13	49	38	+11	35	
9	Royal Antwerp FC	34	11	13	10	38	43	−5	35	
10	Cercle Brugge K.S.V.	34	12	10	12	55	47	+8	34	
11	KV Mechelen	34	7	17	10	35	46	−11	31	
12	R. Charleroi S.C.	34	11	6	17	41	63	−22	28	
13	R.W.D. Molenbeek	34	9	9	16	36	57	−21	27	
14	K.S.C. Lokeren Oost-Vlaanderen	34	9	8	17	45	68	−23	26	
15	K.V. Kortrijk	34	8	9	17	40	52	−12	25	
16	RFC Sérésien	34	6	13	15	23	39	−16	25	
17	K. Waterschei S.V. Thor Genk	34	6	10	18	23	56	−33	22	Relegated to Division II
18	Lierse S.K.	34	5	11	18	34	67	−33	21	Relegated to Division II

== Results ==
Home \ Away	AND	ANT	BEE	BEV	CER	CLU	CHA	GNT	KOR	FCL	LIE	LOK	MEC	MOL	SER	STA	WAR	WTG
Anderlecht		4–1	1–1	1–0	2–3	0–0	5–0	4–0	2–1	4–1	3–0	3–2	3–1	7–0	2–0	1–0	3–1	4–1
Antwerp	0–0		2–2	4–2	2–1	1–1	0–0	4–1	1–0	1–0	2–0	1–1	1–1	1–0	3–1	2–2	0–4	2–0
Beerschot	2–0	0–0		3–1	0–1	0–2	2–0	1–1	1–0	0–0	4–1	3–0	0–0	1–1	2–0	4–3	2–1	3–1
Beveren	1–1	1–1	3–0		2–1	1–1	2–0	0–3	1–1	2–0	2–0	2–2	2–0	4–1	0–0	3–1	2–1	1–1
Cercle Brugge	1–1	0–1	3–2	1–0		0–1	1–1	0–3	4–1	1–1	4–1	1–1	1–1	2–1	1–1	2–2	7–2	4–2
Club Brugge	3–3	2–0	4–0	6–3	3–1		0–0	1–1	3–1	3–1	3–2	5–0	2–2	4–1	2–1	2–3	3–0	3–0
Charleroi	2–6	4–1	0–1	0–4	0–1	1–2		2–3	2–1	2–1	1–1	4–2	2–0	2–2	1–2	2–1	0–1	1–0
Gent	2–3	1–0	0–0	0–0	1–1	2–1	3–1		3–0	0–0	3–0	2–1	0–2	4–0	0–0	1–4	3–1	2–0
Kortrijk	2–2	2–2	4–1	0–2	0–3	0–1	1–0	4–0		0–1	4–0	2–2	2–2	2–3	1–1	2–1	2–1	3–1
Liége	0–0	2–3	3–0	3–1	0–0	2–3	3–1	1–0	2–0		5–2	3–2	0–0	1–0	1–0	0–0	1–0	4–1
Lierse	0–5	0–0	1–1	1–1	1–0	3–6	0–3	0–3	0–1	3–1		5–0	0–0	1–3	1–1	1–1	0–0	2–1
Lokeren	3–5	2–0	2–2	0–1	2–1	0–2	0–1	1–3	2–0	0–1	4–1		2–1	1–1	1–1	1–4	0–3	3–0
Mechelen	1–3	0–0	1–1	0–2	2–2	0–5	4–2	2–2	3–1	1–0	1–1	0–0		3–2	1–0	0–0	2–0	2–2
Molenbeek	1–3	2–1	1–1	2–1	2–4	1–0	4–2	0–1	0–0	1–4	0–1	1–2	3–1		2–0	0–0	0–0	0–0
Seraing	2–1	0–0	0–0	0–2	1–0	1–2	0–1	1–1	2–0	0–1	2–2	1–2	2–1	0–1		0–0	1–1	0–0
Standard Liège	1–0	2–0	0–1	0–1	2–1	3–1	8–0	0–0	0–0	4–0	2–1	2–2	0–0	2–0	3–0		1–1	1–0
Waregem	0–1	3–0	5–1	1–0	3–1	0–0	0–2	3–2	1–1	0–0	1–0	3–0	3–0	1–0	3–1	0–1		5–0
Waterschei Thor	0–1	2–1	2–1	1–1	2–1	0–1	1–1	0–0	2–1	0–0	1–0	1–4	0–0	0–0	0–1	1–3	1–0	

Legend: Blue = home team win; Yellow = draw; Red = away team win.

== Topscorers ==
Scorer	Goals	Team
(Belgium) Erwin Vandenbergh	27	Anderlecht
(Belgium) Didier Beugnies	22	Charleroi
(France) Jean-Pierre Papin	21	Club Brugge
(Belgium) Daniel Veyt	17	Waregem
(Belgium) Marc Degryse	16	Club Brugge
(Belgium) Alexandre Czerniatynski	16	Standard Liège
(Belgium) Jan Ceulemans	13	Club Brugge
(Belgium) Harry Cnops	13	Royal Antwerp

== Championship play-off ==
30 April 1986

Anderlecht	1–1	Club Brugge
Vercauteren 15'		Beyens 64'

Constant Vanden Stock Stadium, Brussels
Attendance: 27,000
Referee: Jean-François Crucke

6 May 1986

Club Brugge	2–2	Anderlecht
Papin 14'; Wellens 32'		Vandereycken 63'; Demol 75'; Vandereycken (red card)

Olympiastadion, Bruges
Attendance: 29,000
Referee: Frans Van Den Wijngaert]

|}

- Anderlecht wins on away goals.

== Attendances ==
No.	Club	Average
1	Anderlecht	16,147
2	Standard	14,118
3	Club Brugge	14,029
4	Charleroi	13,176
5	Liège	8,765
6	Beerschot	7,735
7	Gent	7,500
8	RWDM	6,912
9	Beveren	6,906
10	Lokeren	6,500
11	Waregem	6,324
12	Mechelen	5,982
13	Kortrijk	5,618
14	Waterschei	5,147
15	Antwerp	5,059
16	Lierse	4,853
17	Cercle	4,559
18	Sérésien	4,176

== See also ==
- R.S.C. Anderlecht–Club Brugge KV rivalry
