= Didion =

Didion is a French surname, a pet form of Didier. Notable people with the surname include:

- Joan Didion (1934–2021), American writer
- John Didion (1947–2013), American football player
