= Dezső =

Dezső is a Hungarian given male name, the Hungarian form of the Latin given name Desiderius. It may refer to:

== People ==
- Dezső Bánffy, Hungarian politician
- Dezső Ernster, Hungarian opera singer
- Dezső Földes, Hungarian 2x Olympic champion saber fencer
- Dezső Kanizsai, Hungarian audiologist
- Dezső Kosztolányi, Hungarian poet and writer
- Dezső Ránki, Hungarian concert pianist
- Dezső Varga, Romanian ice hockey player

== See also ==
- 3892 Dezsö, a main belt asteroid
