= Désirée (given name) =

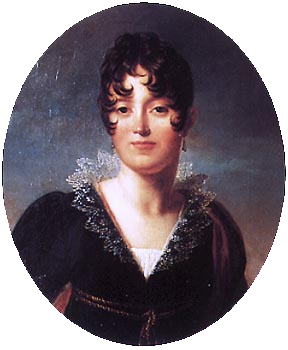
- Désirée Clary (1777–1860), French-born Queen of Sweden and Norway.
- Pronunciation: UK: /deɪ.ˈzɪər.eɪ, dɛ-/, US: /ˌdɛz.ə.ˈreɪ/
- Gender: Female

Origin
- Origin: French
- Region of origin: France

Other names
- Alternative spelling: Desirée, Desiree, Desirae
- Related names: Des, Desi

Désirée, Desiree, Desirée or Desirae (with other variations possible) is a feminine given name of French origin ultimately derived from the Latin word desiderata, meaning desired. Desideria, an early version of the name and a feminine form of Desiderius, was in use in Europe as early as the 800s. The Puritans used the name Desire as a virtue name.

== Notable people ==
- Désirée Artôt (1835–1907), Belgian soprano
- Desirae Brown (born 1979), American classical pianist, member of The 5 Browns
- Desiree Burch (born 1979), American comedian
- Désirée Clary (1777–1860), Queen Desideria of Sweden and Norway
- Desireé Cousteau (born 1956), American pornographic actress
- Desiree del Valle (born 1982), Philippine-American actress
- Desire Doue, French footballer
- Desirée Goyette (born 1956), American singer
- Desiree Gould (1945–2021), American actress
- Desiree Heslop (born 1961), British singer also known by the stage name Princess
- Desiree Horton (born 1971, nickname: "Chopper Chick"), a Los Angeles helicopter pilot and TV reporter
- Désirée Le Beau (1907–1993), Austro-Hungarian-American industrial chemist
- Desiree Lim (born 1971), Malaysian-born Canadian independent film director, producer, and screenwriter
- Desiree Lowry (born 1972), Puerto Rican beauty pageant competitor and director of Miss Universe Puerto Rico
- Desiree van Lunteren (born 1992), Dutch footballer
- Désirée Miloshevic, Internet public servant
- Desirée Murray, Trinidad and Tobago politician
- Désirée Nosbusch (born 1965), Luxembourgish actress
- Desirée Rogers (born 1959), American corporate executive and former White House Social Secretary
- Princess Désirée, Baroness Silfverschiöld (1938–2026), Swedish princess
- Desiree Singh (born 1994), German pole vaulter
- Desirée Sparre-Enger (born 1976), Norwegian bubblegum dance singer also known by the stage name Bambee
- Désirée Talbot (1926–2020), South African opera singer
- Désirée van der Walt (born 1956), South African politician
- Desiree Washington (born 1973), American beauty pageant contestant
- Desi-Rae Young (born 2002), American basketball player
- Desirée Annette Weekes (born 1968), English pop singer known by the stage name Des'ree
