= Desiderius (given name) =

Desiderius is a Latin given name, related to desiderium - which can be translated as "ardent desire" or "the longed-for". Various other forms include Desiderio in Italian, Desiderio or Desi in Spanish, Desidério in Portuguese, Didier in French and Dezső in Hungarian.

Desiderius may refer to:

- Desiderius (died c. 786), the last king of the Lombard Kingdom of northern Italy
- Desiderius of Aquitaine (died 587), Gallo-Roman dux in the Kingdom of the Franks
- Desiderius, Abbot of Monte Cassino (c. 1026–1087), successor of Pope Gregory VII
- Desiderius Erasmus (c. 1466–1536), Dutch humanist and theologian
- Desiderius Hampel (1895-1981), Waffen-SS general
- Desiderius Wein (1873-1944), Hungarian doctor and gymnast

== Saints ==
- Desiderius (lector), (died c. 303)
- Desiderius of Auxerre, (died 621), bishop of Auxerre
- Desiderius of Cahors (c. 580–655), Merovingian royal official
- Desiderius of Fontenelle (died c. 700), Frankish saint
- Desiderius of Vienne (died 607), archbishop of Vienne and chronicler
- Desiderius of Pistoia (died 725)

== See also ==
- Desiderio
- Didier (disambiguation)
- Désirée (given name)
- Dizier
