= Didier Truchot =

French business executive

- Born: November 30, 1946 (age 79)
- Occupations: Founder and previous CEO, Chairman of Ipsos
- Employer: Ipsos

Didier Truchot is a French business executive and is the founder and previous chairman of the global market research company Ipsos. He founded the company in 1975 and was the CEO and co-president from 1988 to 2021, when he was succeeded by Ben Page as CEO, and became chairman until 2026. With an estimated net-worth of 550 million euros, he currently holds the 118th greatest personal fortune in France.

== Career ==
Didier Truchot started his career at the French Institute of Public Opinion (IFOP), where he met Jean-Marc Lech, who would later join Truchot as the co-president of Ipsos. Along with Lech, Truchot led the firm from a small startup to become the third largest market research company in the world.

In 2026, Didier resigned as Chairman of the Board of Directors for health reason.

== Personal life ==
Didier Truchot has five children and two grandchildren. He stated in October 2015 that he was planning to write a memoir of his life experiences.
