= Ipsos =

French market research company

Ipsos Group S.A.
- Type: Public
- Traded as: Euronext: IPS; CAC Mid 60 component
- Industry: Market research; Public opinion research
- Founded: 1975; 51 years ago
- Founder: Didier Truchot
- Headquarters: Paris, France
- Area served: Worldwide
- Key people: Laurence Stoclet (chairwoman); Kelly Beaver (CEO)
- Revenue: ▲€2.52 billion (2025)
- Operating income: ▼€306 million (2025)
- Net income: ▼€187 million (2025)
- Total assets: ▲€3.08 billion (2025)
- Total equity: ▼€1.57 billion (2025)
- Website: www.ipsos.com

Ipsos Group S.A. (French: [ipsos]; acronym of Institut Public de Sondage d'Opinion Secteur and inspired from the Latin expression, ipso facto) is a multinational market research and consulting firm, headquartered in Paris, France. The company was founded in 1975 by Didier Truchot, Chairman of the company, and has been publicly traded on Euronext Paris since 1 July 1999.

Since 1990, the Group has created or acquired numerous companies. In October 2011, Ipsos acquired Synovate, resulting in an Ipsos organization that ranks as the world’s third largest research agency. As of 2025, Ipsos has offices in 87 countries, employing approximately 20,000 people.

== History ==
=== First years in France ===
Ipsos was founded in 1975 by Didier Truchot, who had experience working in the Institut français d'opinion publique.

Truchot centered in offering services to the advertising and media companies and developed methods to measure the success of their campaigns, something new in France. The first of these methods was the Baromètre d'Affichage (BAF) in 1977, an instrument to analyse the effectiveness of billboard advertisements. It was followed by an instrument specific for media and, in 1979, the France des Cadres Actifs (FCA), which was used to determine reading habits of French executives.

Despite the success, the company's profitability remained at modest levels until the arrival of Jean-Marc Lech as co-chairman. From then on, it started to perform public opinion researches, another innovative activity in the French market. By the end of the '80s, it was the fifth largest media research company in France. The great activity of French policymakers at the time helped to strengthen the position of the company, especially the public opinion research sector.

=== European expansion ===
During the 1990s, Ipsos expanded, principally through acquisitions, to Spain, Italy, Germany, the United Kingdom and Central Europe, especially Hungary.

In 1992, the company was opened to private investment to improve its purchasing capital. The first new shareholder was Baring Private Equity. Truchot and Lech, the major shareholders, retained two-thirds of the company.

=== Global expansion ===
In the mid-1990s Ipsos was one of the most important research companies in Europe and decided to expand globally. Ipsos took on new investment partners, selling 40 percent of the company to Artemis Group, led by François Pinault, and the Amstar investment fund led by Walter Butler.

In 1997, Ipsos entered into the South American market with the acquisition of Novaction’s companies in Argentina, Brazil, and Mexico. In 1998, it entered the North American market with the purchase of the American company ASI Market Research.

In 1999, Ipsos was listed on the Paris stock exchange. The successful offering enabled Artemis and Amstar to cash out on their investments and also gave Ipsos the possibility to continue its expansion. Then, it participated of the creation of an Internet audience research joint-venture, MMXI Europe, with the majority of shares held by partner Media Matrix and 20 percent by Ipsos. The company also took control of four subsidiaries of NFO Worldwide specializing in the formation of access panels. The expansion continued in Asia, South America and especially in North America (with the purchase of the Canadian company Angus Reid, renamed Ipsos-Reid in 2000).

In 2009, Ipsos partnered with Thomson Reuters to conduct multi-country polling on consumer topics, politics, and economic confidence. The results of the polls would be published on Reuters. In 2011, Ipsos acquired Aegis Group Plc's Synovate division. On 30 October 2018, Ipsos announced that it acquired Synthesio, a Social Intelligence Suite that was named the leading global Social Listening platform by Forrester Research since 2014.

In November 2021, Ben Page became CEO, replacing Didier Truchot, the founder, who remained as Chairman. In February 2023, it was announced Ipsos had acquired the New York-based business-to-business research company, Xperiti for an undisclosed amount. In September 2025, Jean Laurent Poitou succeeded Page as CEO. In July 2026, Kelly Beaver succeeded Poitou as CEO

== KnowledgePanel ==
Ipsos polls in the United States are conducted through a probability-based online panel known as KnowledgePanel, which contains about 60,000 members as potential respondents. It relies on address-based sampling to recruit respondents, with its sampling frame provided by the United States Postal Service's Delivery Sequence File. A random sample of households is invited to join the panel through mail or telephone. Polls themselves are conducted online in a single-mode fashion, with Ipsos providing respondents access to the internet if needed. Demographic information about each respondent is collected initially, which is then used to deliver polls through a custom sampling method depending on the poll's target population. Sampling is conducted on the entire panel for general population polls, and stratified samples are utilized for narrower focuses. Respondents are incentivized for the surveys they complete.

Survey results are weighted for demographic variables with the United States census's Current Population Survey and American Community Survey.

== Financial performance ==
Ipsos revenues totaled €2,525 million in 2025, with an organic growth rate of 0.6%. In 2025, Ipsos derived 49% of its revenue from the EMEA region (Europe, the Middle East and Africa), 35% from the Americas region, and 16% from the Asia-Pacific region.

=== Top 5 of the Market Research Sector 2023 ===
Rank	Company	Revenues in 2023 (million USD)
1	IQVIA	5,616
2	Nielsen Holdings	3,500
3	Kantar Group	2,980
4	Ipsos	2,585
5	Circana	2,344

Source: ESOMAR Global Market Research Report 2024

== Subsidiaries ==
- Ipsos MORI
- Ipsos-Reid
- Ipsos Strategy3
- Ipsos Alfacom
- Ipsos Apoyo
- Ipsos Archway
- Ipsos ASI
- Ipsos Bimsa
- Ipsos B&A
- Ipsos Connect
- Ipsos Healthcare
- Ipsos Insight
- Ipsos Interactive Services
- Ipsos Loyalty
- Ipsos Marketing
- Ipsos Markinor (Ipsos South Africa)
- Ipsos MRBI
- Ipsos Novaction
- Ipsos Observer
- Ipsos Public Affairs
- Ipsos RDA
- Ipsos UU
- Ipsos Vantis
- Livra.com
- Karian and Box

=== Ipsos Australia ===
Ipsos Australia has existed since at least 2000, and as of 2025 has offices in Sydney, Melbourne, Perth, and Brisbane. It runs opinion polls on a number of issues, such as community support for changing the date of Australia Day, moving away from coal, Australia becoming a republic, the effects of the COVID-19 pandemic on young people's mental health, and, until 2019, political preferences.

The results of Ipsos polls in Australia are published in The Sydney Morning Herald (SMH), The Age and the Australian Financial Review (AFR). However, following a shock result of the 2019 Australian federal election, when the Liberal–National Coalition won the election against all of the opinion polls' predictions, the Nine Entertainment group, which owns the SMH, Age and AFR, decided to discontinue its relationship with Ipsos. Since then and as of 2022 the newspapers have not reported any political polling, but continue to report the results of other Ipsos polls.

=== Ipsos UK ===
From 2005 to 2022, Ipsos operated in the United Kingdom under the name Ipsos MORI, as the UK arm of the global Ipsos group and based in London, England. In 2022, it shortened its name to simply "Ipsos". It was formed by a merger of Ipsos UK and MORI (Market and Opinion Research International) in October 2005.

The company is a member of the British Polling Council and Market Research Society. Ipsos MORI's research is conducted via a wide range of methodologies, using computer-assisted telephone interviewing (CATI), as well as face-to-face (CAPI) and Internet surveys. Many telephone surveys use a system called random digit dialing to interview a representative group of the population.

In 1946, Mark Abrams formed a market research company called Research Services Ltd. (RSL). RSL operated until 1991 when it was acquired by Ipsos, becoming Ipsos UK. MORI (Market and Opinion Research International) was founded in 1969 by Robert Worcester. Robert Worcester stepped down from chairmanship of MORI in June 2005. Ipsos announced it would acquire MORI in October 2005 for £88 million, and would merge it with Ipsos UK. The merged company was named Ipsos MORI. In February 2022 the company rebranded to simply Ipsos.

In May 2013, The Sunday Times reported that Ipsos MORI had negotiated an agreement with the EE mobile phone network to commercialise the data on that company's 23 million subscribers. The article stated that Ipsos MORI was looking to sell this data to the Metropolitan Police and other parties. The data included "gender, age, postcode, websites visited, time of day text is sent [and] location of customer when call is made". When confronted by the newspaper, the Metropolitan Police indicated that they would not be taking the discussions any further. Ipsos MORI defended their actions, stressing that the company only received anonymised data, without any personally identifiable data on an individual customer, and underlining that reports are only ever made on aggregated groups of more than 50 customers.

=== Ipsos Canada ===
Ipsos is Canada's largest market research and public opinion polling firm. The company's researchers conduct both syndicated and customized research studies across key sectors of the Canadian economy, including consumer packaged goods, financial services, automotive, retail, health and technology & telecommunications. It had operated as Ipsos Reid, for its Canada-based operations, although now under the name Ipsos, as the Canadian arm of the global Ipsos Group. It was founded in Winnipeg in 1979 as the Angus Reid Group, and the company expanded across the country. It was purchased by the Ipsos Group and given the name Ipsos Reid in 2000.

With operations in seven Canadian cities, Ipsos employs more than 600 research professionals and support staff across Canada. The company has the biggest network of telephone call centres in the country, as well as the largest pre-recruited household and online panels. The current President and CEO for Ipsos in Canada is Gary Bennewies.

Ipsos in Canada is a member of the Marketing Research and Intelligence Association.

== Polling accuracy ==
During the 2021–2022 United States election cycle, in the last 21 days before each election, Ipsos polls only correctly predicted winners 17% of the time, according to a FiveThirtyEight analysis of elections for state governor, U.S. Senate, and House of Representatives.
