= Didier Guzzoni =

Swiss computer scientist and inventor of Siri

PhD Didier René Guzzoni
- Born: 1970 (age 55–56); Geneva
- Citizenship: Swiss
- Occupation: Senior Software Engineer
- Known for: Artificial intelligence Intelligent assistants Siri

Academic background
- Education: Electrical engineering Computer science
- Alma mater: EPFL (École Polytechnique Fédérale de Lausanne)
- Thesis: Active: a unified platform for building intelligent applications (2008)
- Doctoral advisor: Charles Baur

Academic work
- Discipline: Computer science
- Institutions: Apple Inc.
- Website: http://www.apple.com

Didier Guzzoni (born 1970 in Geneva) is a Swiss computer scientist and senior software engineer with the Apple's Siri team. He was a founding member and chief scientist at the start-up company Siri Inc. that was later acquired by Apple Inc.

== Career ==
Guzzoni studied electrical engineering at the Geneva State Engineering School, followed by studies in computer science at EPFL, where obtained a master's degree in 1996. He then worked with Charles Baur on medical robotics application at EPFL's Virtual Reality and Active Interface group. In 1997, he moved to Silicon Valley to join the SRI International's Artificial Intelligence Center to work with Luc Julia and Adam Cheyer at on artificial intelligence and robotics. Then he was involved in multiple start-ups ranging from mobile robotics to AI-powered B2B platforms, where he collaborated among others with Rajiv Gupta and Shamik Sharma.

In 2004, he returned to EPFL to join Charles Baur's laboratory as a PhD student. His research aimed at facilitating the access on complex artificial intelligence techniques by software developers.

After his graduation in 2007, together with Tom Gruber and Dag Kittlaus he cofounded and became chief scientist Siri Inc., a start-up company developing a mobile intelligent assistant. The company was acquired in 2010 by Apple Inc., and its technology has been incorporated with most Apple products since 2011. He is a senior software engineer with the Apple's Siri team.

== Selected works ==
Journal papers

- Baur Charles; Guzzoni Didier; Georg Olivier (1998). "Virgy: A Virtual Reality and Force Feedback Based Endoscopic Surgery Simulator". Medicine Meets Virtual Reality. Studies in Health Technology and Informatics. Vol. 50. pp. 110–6. doi:10.3233/978-1-60750-894-6-110. PMID 10180525.
- Guzzoni, Didier; Adam Cheyer; Luc Julia; Kurt Konolige (1997). "Many Robots Make Short Work: Report of the SRI International Mobile Robot Team". AI Magazine. 18. doi:10.1609/aimag.v18i1.1274.
- Guzzoni, Didier; et al. (1998). "Robots in a Distributed Agent System." Cognitive Robotics" (PDF). Cognitive Robotics-Papers from the 1998 AAAI Fall Symposium: 61–67.

Thesis

- Guzzoni, Didier (2007). Active: A unified platform for building intelligent applications (Thesis). Lausanne, EPFL. doi:10.5075/epfl-thesis-3990.

Patent

- US 8677377, Cheyer, Adam & Guzzoni, Didier, "Method and apparatus for building an intelligent automated assistant", published 2014-03-18, assigned to Apple Inc.
