= Ben Page (market researcher) =

British market researcher (born 1965)

Benjamin Page
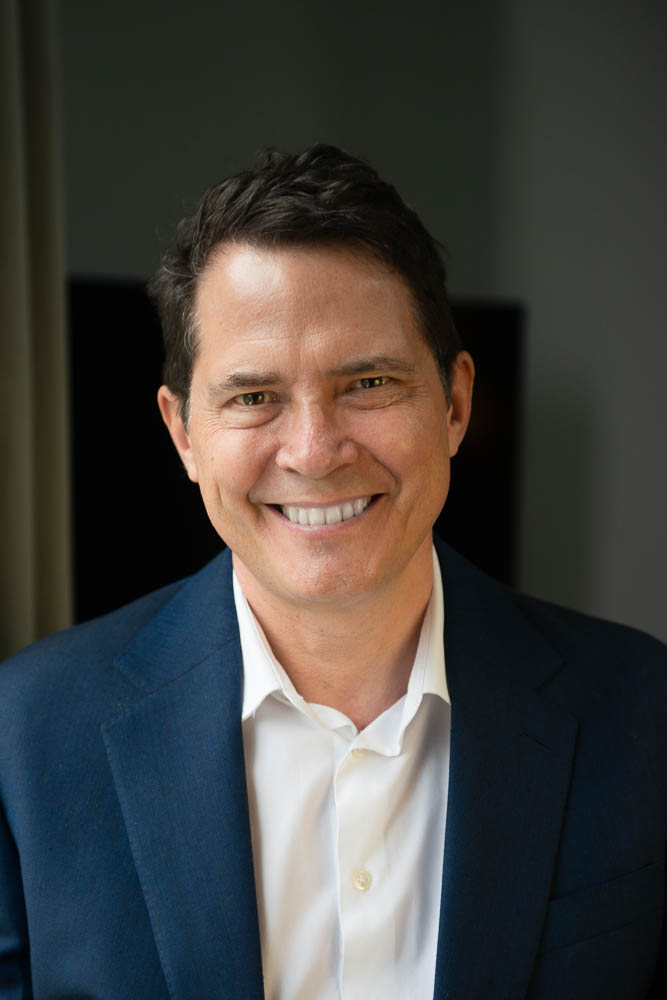
- Ben Page
- Born: 9 January 1965 (age 61)
- Occupation: market researcher

Benjamin Page (born 9 January 1965) is an English market researcher. He was chief executive officer of Ipsos MORI from 2009 to 2021, and Ipsos from 2021 to 2025. Page graduated from St. John's College, Oxford in 1986.

== Career ==
Page has been on a range of independent commissions and reviews and is a member of the advisory boards of the King's Fund, Institute of Public Policy Research (IPPR), and the Social Market Foundation (SMF). He sits on the Economic and Social Research Council (ESRC) at UK Research and Innovation (UKRI). He is a trustee for the Centre for Ageing Better.

He was one of a group of executives involved in the management buyout of MORI in 2000 and its subsequent sale to Ipsos in 2005. From 2000-2009 he led the Ipsos MORI Social Research Institute, becoming Ipsos UK CEO in 2009. In September 2021 he was appointed as the CEO of Ipsos. In September 2025, Page was succeeded as CEO by Jean‑Laurent Poitou.

== Honours and awards ==
He was awarded the Market Research Society (MRS) Silver medal award in 2005.

In 2015, he was ranked 3rd on a list of 100 Most Connected Men in Britain by GQ.

In 2016, Page was elected a Fellow of the Academy of Social Sciences (FAcSS).

In 2019, he was elected a Fellow of the Market Research Society (FMRS).

In 2023 he was ranked one of the three most influential CEOs in France on social media by Les Echos.
