= Desiderio Tello =

Coordinates: 31°13′S 66°19′W

- Municipality and village
- Interactive map of Desiderio Tello
- Country: Argentina
- Province: La Rioja Province

Population
  - Total: 733
- (2010)
- Time zone: UTC−3 (ART)
- Climate: BSh

Desiderio Tello is a municipality and village in La Rioja Province in northwestern Argentina.
