= Desidério Murcho =

Portuguese philosopher (born 1965)

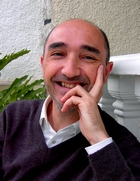
- Born: 18 May 1965 (age 61)

Philosophical work
- Era: Contemporary philosophy
- Region: Western philosophy
- Main interests: Logic; ethics; philosophy of religion

Desidério Murcho (born 18 May 1965) is a Portuguese philosopher, professor, and writer. Desidério Murcho got his BA in philosophy in 1992 from Lisbon University and his MA in 2000 from the same university. He is pursuing a PhD in philosophy at the King's College London since 2000. He is founding member of the Centro para o Ensino da Filosofia da Sociedade Portuguesa de Filosofia (Center For the Teaching of Philosophy of the Portuguese Philosophy Society).

He was the director of the online journal Crítica. He wrote a column in the Os Meus Livros magazine and wrote a weekly chronicle in the Público daily paper. He was managing editor of the Disputatio journal. He has worked in the training of secondary education philosophy teachers in Portugal.

== Publications ==
Author of:

- Essencialismo Naturalizado (Angelus Novus, 2002)
- A Natureza da Filosofia e o seu Ensino (Plátano, 2002)
- O Lugar da Lógica na Filosofia (Plátano, 2003)
- Pensar Outra Vez: Filosofia, Valor e Verdade (Quasi, 2006).

He is co-author of A Arte de Pensar (for the 10th and 11th grades) (Didáctica Editora, 2003 and 2004).

He edits, together with Guilherme Valente, the Filosofia Aberta series from Gradiva. He translated several philosophy works (including Logics, by William Newton-Smith, and The Last Word, by Thomas Nagel). He organized with João Branquinho the Enciclopédia de Termos Lógico-Filosóficos (Encyclopedia of Logical and Philosophical Terms) (Gradiva, 2001; Martins Fontes, 2006). He published articles and reviews in the Revista Filosófica de Coimbra (Coimbra Philosophical Journal) and in Philosophica.
