= Didier Michaud-Daniel =

French business executive

- Born: 2 February 1958 (age 68); Montluçon, France
- Education: École supérieure de commerce et management, INSEAD
- Occupation: Business executive
- Known for: Executive Chair of the Board of Pluxee

Didier Michaud-Daniel (born 2 February 1958) is a French business executive. Since December 2023, he has been the Executive Chair of the Board of Pluxee, a global employee benefits and engagement firm. From March 2012 to June 2023, he was CEO of Bureau Veritas, one of the world’s leading providers of testing, inspection and certification services.

== Early life and education ==
Didier Michaud-Daniel was born in Montluçon, France and in 1958 he obtained a degree in management from the École supérieure de commerce et management de Poitiers, and is also a graduate of INSEAD.

== Career ==
Michaud-Daniel began his career at Otis Elevator Company in 1981 in the field of service sales. In 1991, he was named Field Operations Director for Otis France. In 1992, he was promoted to the position of Director of Operations and Sales in Paris. He was appointed Deputy Managing Director of Operations in January 1998.

From September 2001 to August 2004, Michaud-Daniel was Managing Director of Otis UK and Ireland. From 2004 to 2008, he was President of the UK and Central Europe zone for Otis.

In May 2008, he was named President of the Otis Elevator Company.

In March 2012, Michaud-Daniel was appointed CEO of Bureau Veritas.

Michaud-Daniel was appointed to Tarkett's supervisory board as a member of the committee on nominations, remuneration and governance in April 2019.

In December 2023, Michaud-Daniel was appointed Executive Chair of the Board of Pluxee.
