= Didier Ben Loulou =

Franco-Israeli photographer (born 1958)

- דידייה בן לולו
- Didier Ben Loulou (2026)
- Born: 1958 (age 67–68); France
- Occupation: Photographer

Didier Ben Loulou (Hebrew: דידייה בן לולו; born 29 May 1958) is a Franco-Israeli photographer.

== Biography ==
Didier Ben Loulou was born on 29 May 1958, in Paris, France. He studied art history and photography before moving to Israel in 1981, where he volunteered on Kibbutz Ma’agan Michael. He took up photography, working on a first project, Israel Eighties, a series of images in black and white. In 1983, he was admitted to the Mayanot Institute for Jewish Studies in Jerusalem, to study under Rabbi Leon Ashkhenazi (Manitou).

In the next two decades, Didier Ben Loulou undertook a vast photographic project on towns and cities, a collection of portraits under the format of a “photographic repertoire” of urban geographies. In the ancient and historical port of Jaffa and the Ajami Neighbourhood, he observed the comings and goings of populations, their exile and asylum. His focus moved to Jerusalem between the two Intifadas (1991-2008), cornerstone of his work, where he explored the meanders of a city with multiple borders, filled with violence and the sacred. A book, Jérusalem: 1991-2006, was published in 2008.

In the 1990s, Didier Ben Loulou attended a series of seminars in philosophy at the Institute d’Etudes Lévinassiennes in Jerusalem, conducted by Benny Levy.

In the aftermath of the Second Intifada, Didier Ben Loulou begun a new photographic project on the old Jewish cemeteries in and around Jerusalem and in Galilee, seeking the ties between the permanent and the fleeting, away from the tumult of war - forgotten headstones, texts fragments or books left behind on barren hills - . He questioned the spiritual and the invisible through a series of images on the Hebrew letters, the Aleph-Bet transcending the sacred and the profane, to establish a bond between the living and the dead.

Didier Ben Loulou travelled extensively along the Mediterranean coast, to cities and landscapes, in search of the meaning of wandering. From 2006 to 2008, he photographed gypsies mingling with migrants in Athens, merger of the Third and the Fourth Worlds on the outskirts of the capital. From 2006 to 2019, he finalized a project on Corsica, Sanguinaires, quintessence according to him of the Mediterranean. He examined the notion of re- enchantment and the possibility of happiness in a chaotic world: "I simply want to be the bearer of what is revealed to me, silently and in secret". Since then, Didier Ben Loulou has been leading a nomadic existence between Jerusalem, Marseille, Jaffa, Athens, Tanger, Palermo, Safed, Thessaloniki and Ajaccio.

He is currently working on a new project on Judea.

The square format and colours are all-important features of his work, as well as the Fresson process used to print his analogue images since 1979. He is a Villa Medici Hors les Murs laureate (1995) and the recipient of a Fiacre (French Ministry of Culture) scholarship (1997). Didier Ben Loulou is the author of about twenty books, including three journals and reflections on his approach, Chroniques de Jérusalem et d’ailleurs (2016), Un Hiver en Galilée (2018), Mise au Point with Fabien Ribery (2019) and Une année de Solitude (2020). His works are regularly exhibited in Europe and the United States. The Institute for Contemporary Publishing Archives (IMEC) is the repository of his private archives since 2007. Un Hiver en Galilée (2018), and Mise au Point with Fabien Ribery (2019).

== Gallery ==
Fresson Prints.

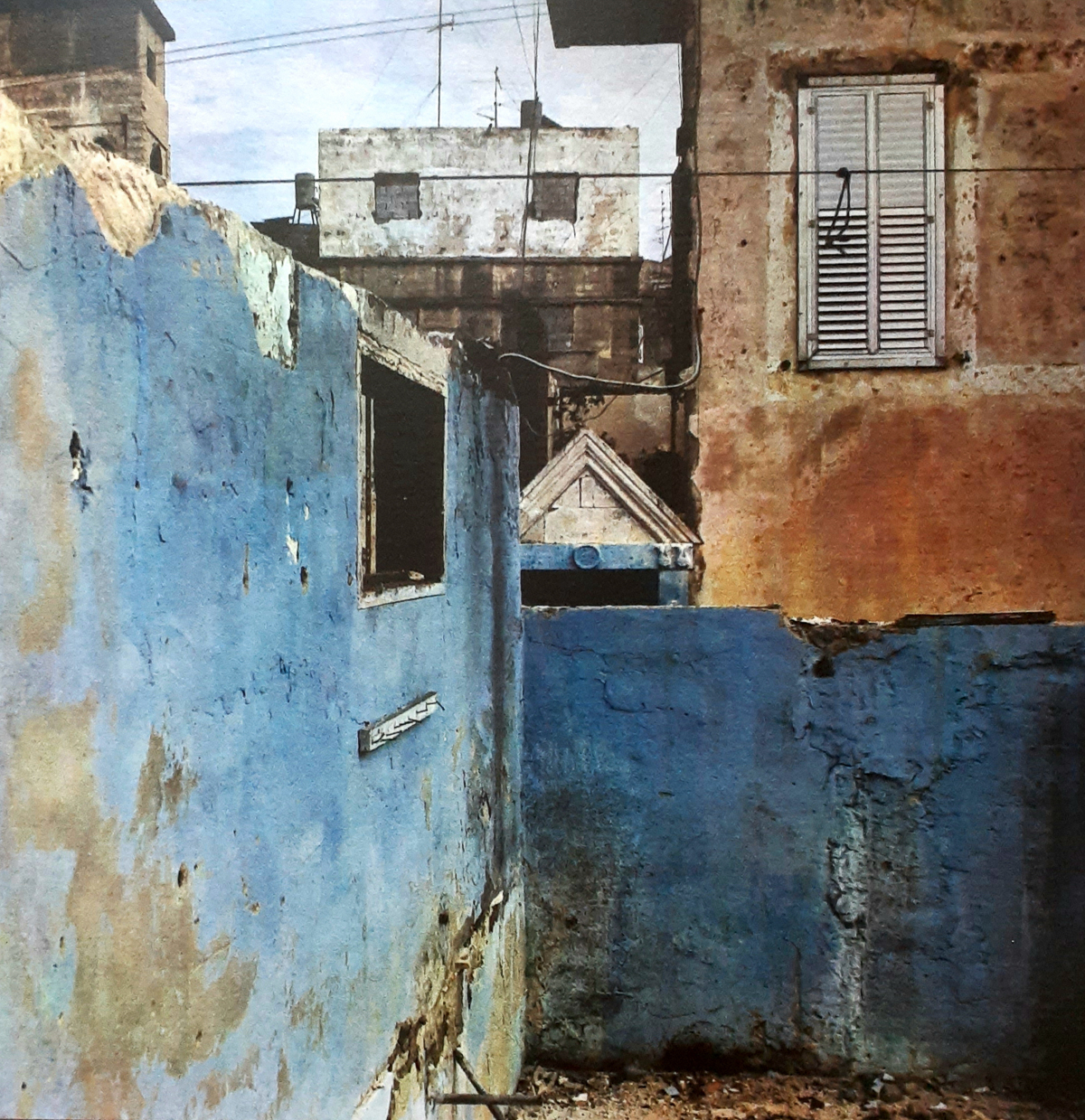

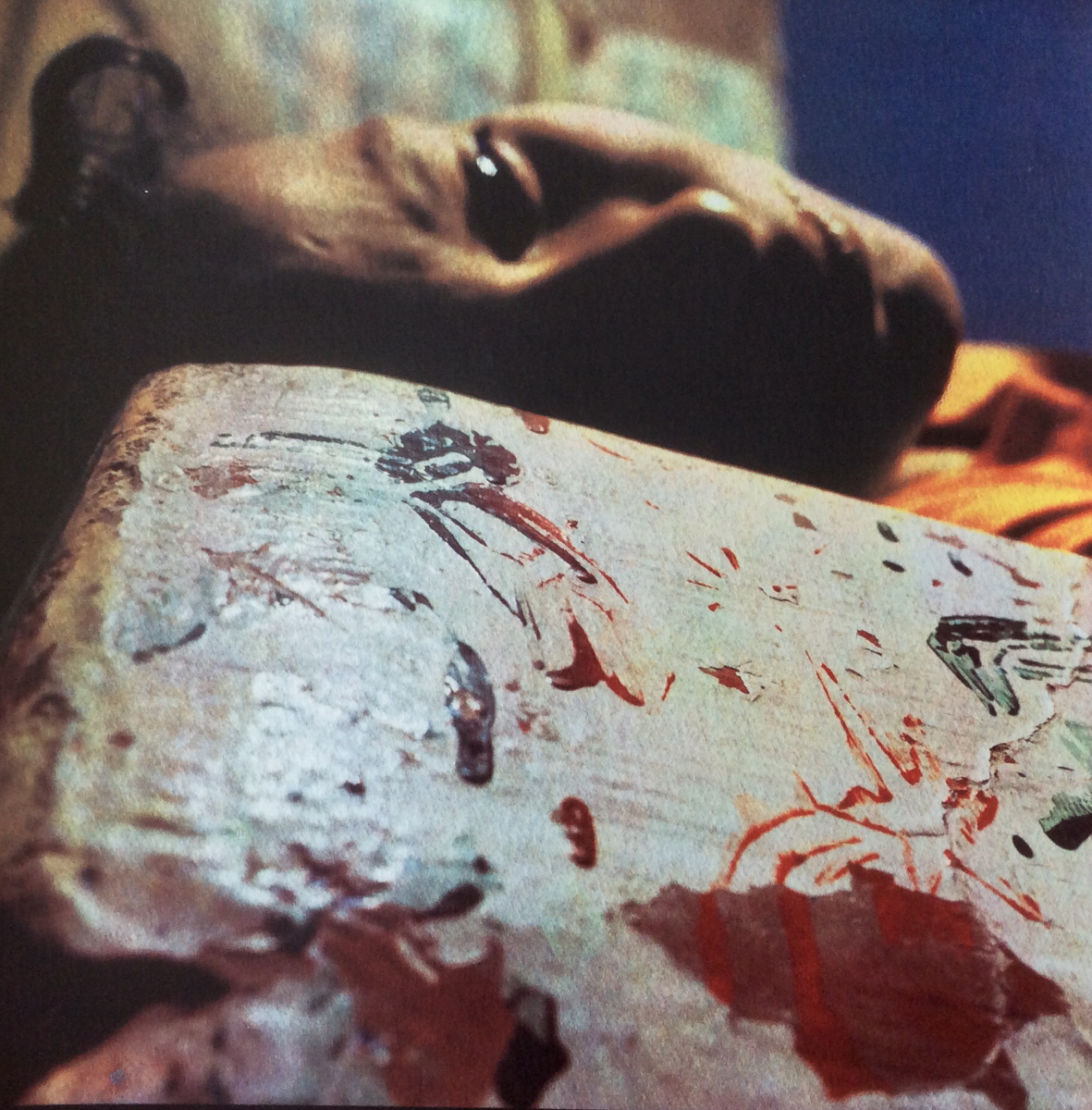

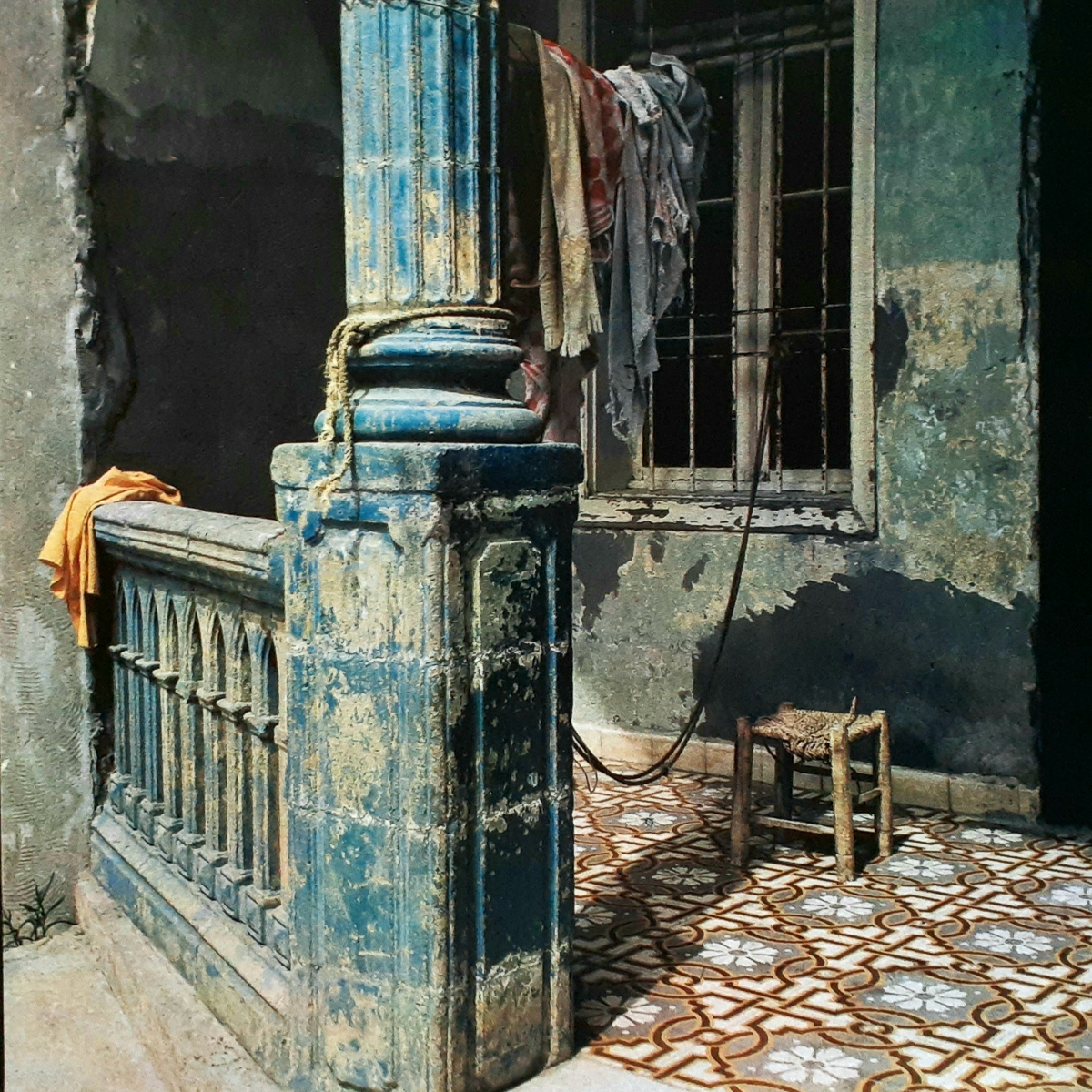
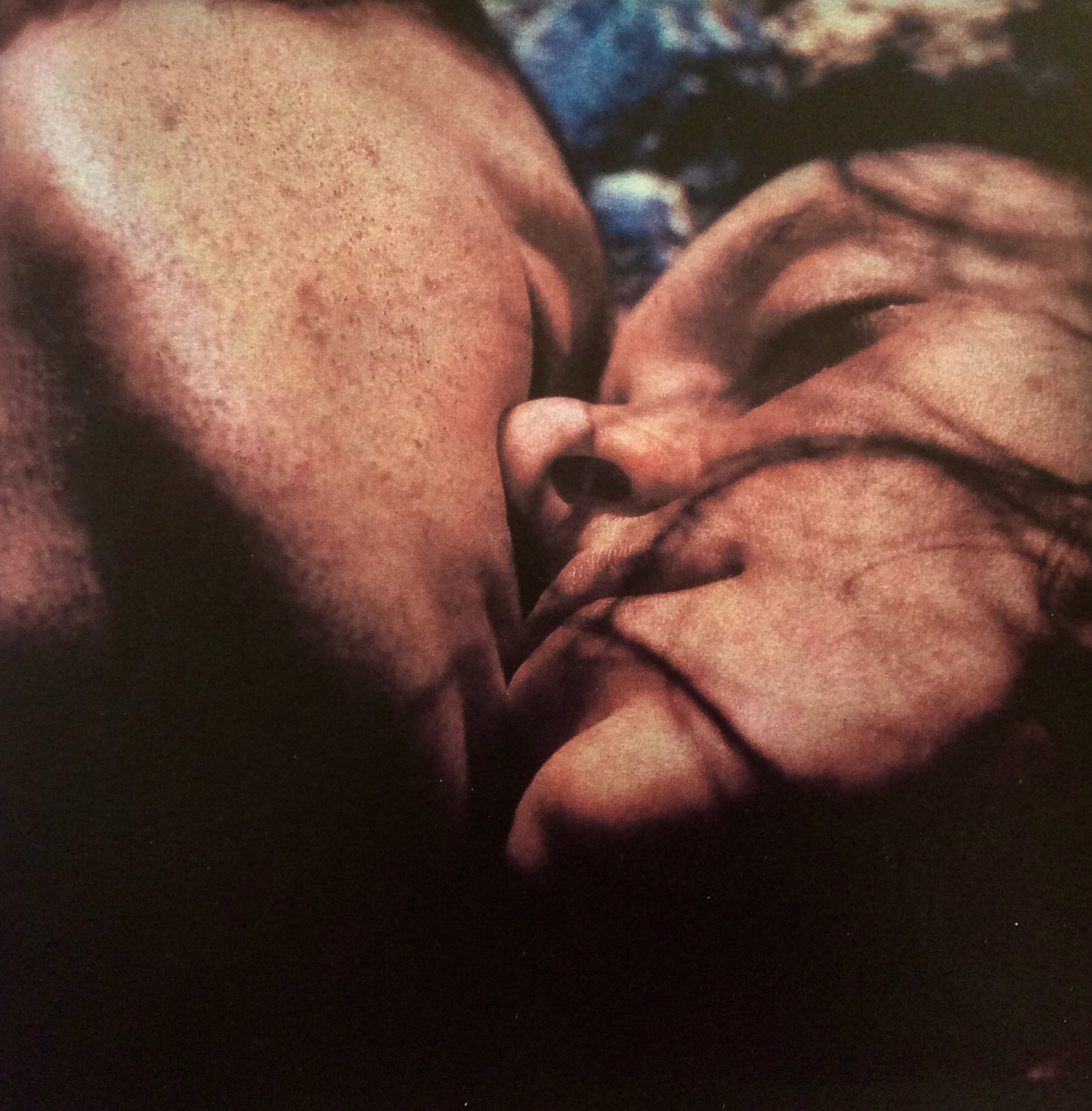

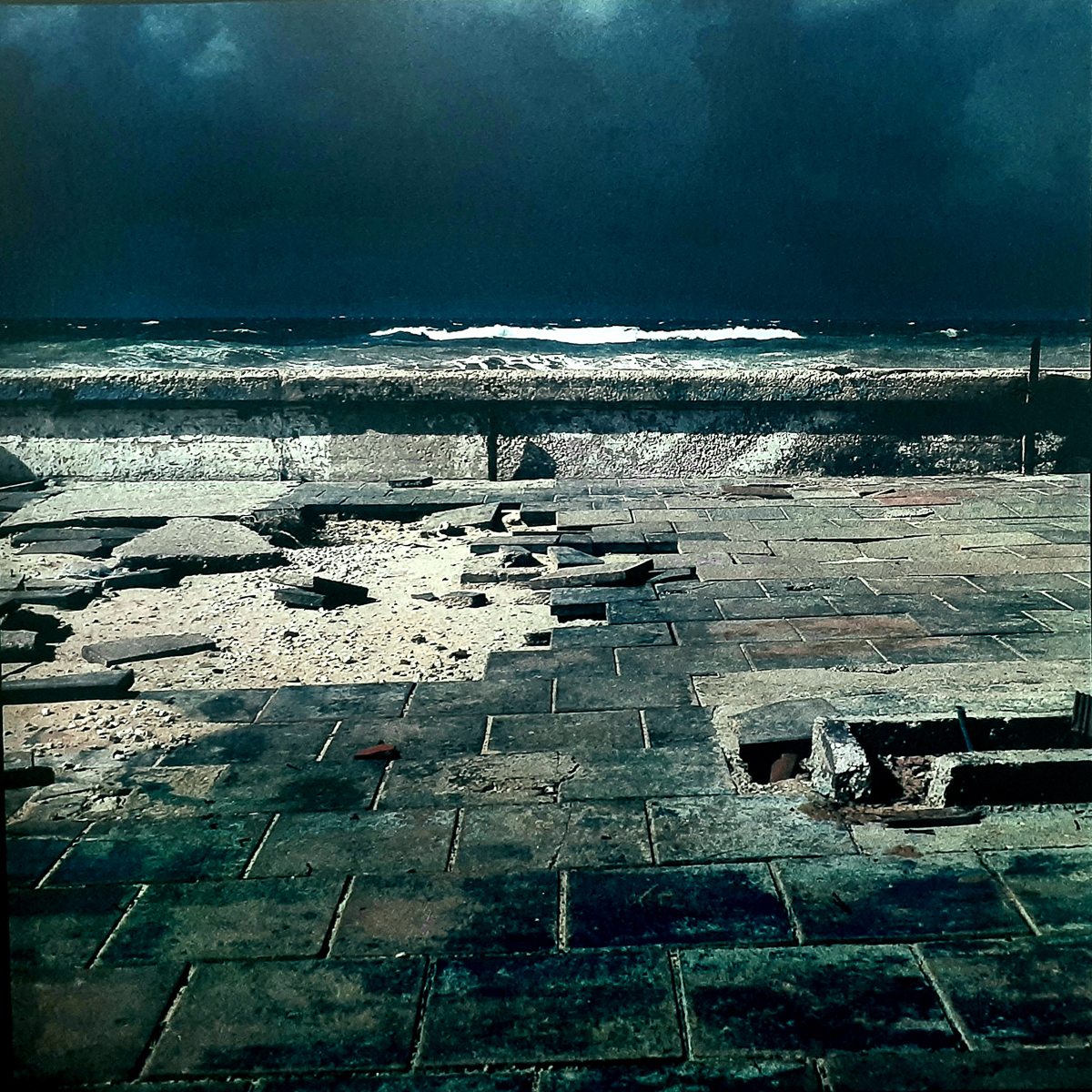

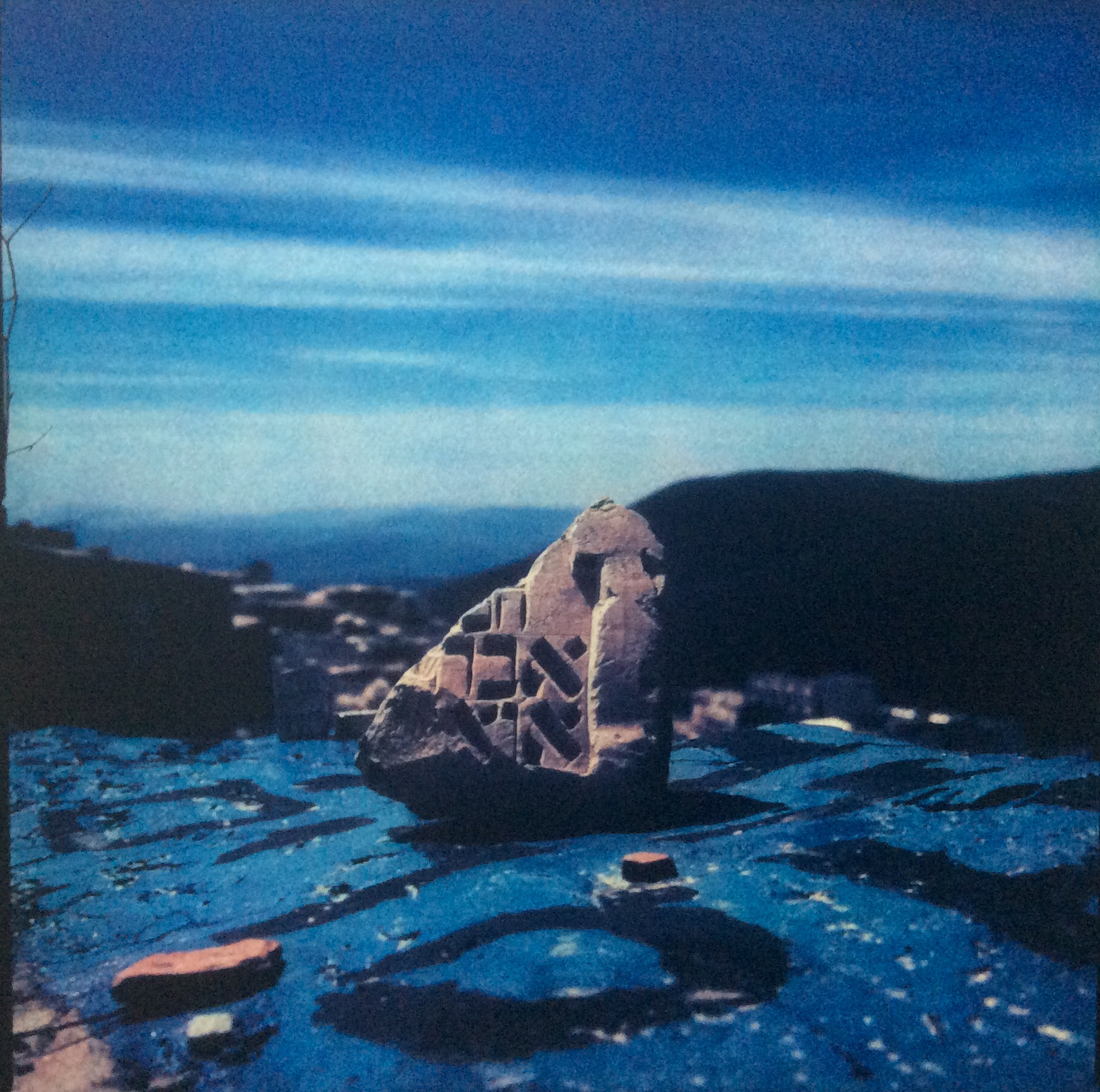

== Publications ==
=== Monography ===
- Je suis du jour, texte Hubert Colas, Carnet de voyages n° 3, Éditions Le Point du jour et FRAC Basse-Normandie, 1996
- Fragments, Chantal Dahan, Éditions Filigranes, Paris, 1997
- Didier Ben Loulou, texte Jacques Py, Éditions Joca Seria, Nantes, 2000
- Vézelay, Éditions Conseil Général de l’Yonne, direction des Affaires culturelles, Auxerre, 2000
- A Touch of Grace, poèmes de Yehuda Amichaï, catalogue Museum on the Seam, Jérusalem, Israël, 2000
- Sincérité du visage, texte de Catherine Chalier, Éditions Filigranes, Paris, 2004
- Jaffa, la passe, texte de Caroline Fourgeaud-Laville, Éditions Filigranes, Paris, 2006
- Jérusalem, Éditions du Panama, Paris, 2008
- Mémoire des lettres, textes de Catherine Chalier et Betty Rojtman, Éditions de la Table Ronde Paris, 2012
- Athènes, poèmes de Yorgos Markopoulos, Éditions de La Table Ronde, Paris, 2013
- Marseille, textes de Didier Ben Loulou, Éditions Arnaud Bizalion, Marseille, 2014
- Je t’écris devant les fenêtres de mon hôtel, notes indiennes, textes Didier Ben Loulou, Éditions Arnaud Bizalion, Marseille, 2016
- Chroniques de Jérusalem et d’ailleurs, Éditions Arnaud Bizalion, Marseille, 2016
- Israel Eighties, Éditions de la Table Ronde, Paris, 2016
- Sud, Éditions de La Table Ronde, Paris, 2018
- Un hiver en Galilée, Éditions Arnaud Bizalion, Marseille, 2018
- Cantique des cantiques, Songes de Leonard Cohen, poème de Zéno Bianu & Odradek, Les éditions de l’Improbable, Paris, 2019
- Mise au point, conversations avec Fabien Ribery, Éditions Arnaud Bizalion, Marseille, 2019
- Sanguinaires, Éditions de La Table Ronde, Paris, 2020
- Une année de solitude, journal, Éditions Arnaud Bizalion, Marseille, 2021
- La Méditerranée, Tritone Press, USA, 2022
- Judée, Paris, La Table Ronde, 2023, 96 p.
- Seaside, Paris, La Table Ronde, 2025, 80 p.
- Marseille, Arnaud Bizalion éditeur, 2025, 96 p.

=== Artist's Books ===
- Violence du visage, Emmanuel Levinas, livre d’artiste, 30 copy, Éditions Fata Morgana, Montpellier, 1997
- Dans la langue de personne, poem by Paul Celan, collection Pho’Eau # 6, livre d’artiste, 40 copy, Éditions de l’Eau, 1999
- Portfolio #57, texte de Nicolas Feuillie, 12 copy, Galerie Pennings, Eindhoven, 2002
- Voici des sépultures qui datent des temps anciens, poème d’Ibn Ezra, 15 copy, Le Bousquet-la-Barthe éditions, avec une calligraphie en couverture de Frank Lalou, 2018
- Cantique des cantiques, Songes de Léonard Cohen, poème de Zéno Bianu & Odradek, 40 copy, Les Éditions de l’Improbable, Paris, 2019
- Une image sainte, Fabien Ribery pour dire une photographie de Didier Ben Loulou, 200 copy, Les éditions Les petites allées, 2021

== Exhibitions ==
- The Gallery of Photographic Art, Tel Aviv, Israel, 1983
- Palais du Pharo, Marseille, France, 1994
- Centre de la photographie, Geneva, Switzerland, 1994
- Galerie Graphe, Paris, France, 1994
- Tour du Roy René, Fort Saint-Jean, Marseille, France, 1996
- Centre méditerranéen de la photographie, Paysages des deux rives, Bastia, France, 1996
- Espace Saint-Cyprien, Toulouse, France, 1996
- Centre culturel français, Ramallah and Gaza, Palestine, 1997
- Galerie Camera Obscura, Les Écritures, Paris, France, 1998
- Impressions Gallery, York, United Kingdom, 1998
- Oregon Center for the Photographic Arts, Portland, United States, 1998
- IFA Galerie, Orient-Traum und Wirklichkeit, Stuttgart, Germany, 1999
- Artothèque, Nantes, France, 2000
- Museum on the Seam, A Touch of Grace, Jerusalem, Israel, 2000
- Galerie municipale du Château d'eau, Toulouse, France, 2001
- Vision Gallery, Jerusalem, Israel, 2001
- Musée d'Art et d'Histoire du Judaïsme, Jérusalem, traverses et marges, Paris, France, 2001
- Fotogaleria, Teatro San Martin, Buenos Aires, Argentina, 2001
- Atelier de Visu, Marseille, France, 2001
- Galerie Pennings, Jerusalem: Byways and Sidelines, Eindhoven, Netherlands, 2002
- Benham Gallery, Can We Talk Now ? With Simon Norfolk, Seattle, United States, 2003
- Stephen Cohen Gallery, Los Angeles, United States, 2003
- Galerie Rimonim, The Face of a City in Conflict, East Hampton, United States, 2003
- Hovedbiblioteket, Esbjerg, Denmark, 2004
- Galerie Krisal, Sincérité du visage, Geneva, Switzerland, 2004
- Musée d'Art et d'Histoire du Judaïsme, Rencontres, Paris, France, 2005
- Museum of Photographic Art, San Diego, United States, 2007
- Galerie Camayeux, Marseille, France, 2007
- Cats & Marbles, Villes d'hier, visages d'aujourd'hui, Mois de la photographie, Athens, Greece, 2007
- Le Garage photographie, Marseille, France, 2013
- Galerie Le Carré d'art, Athènes, Chartres-de-Bretagne, France, 2013
- Le Carré Amelot, Athènes, La Rochelle, France, 2014
- La Non Maison, D’une ville à l’autre, Aix-en-Provence, France, 2014
- Arles, La Bourse du travail, Marseille, Rencontres de la photographie off, Arles, France, 2014
- Hôtel Blain, The Tribe, Arles, 2015
- Centre culturel Romain Gary, Vision Fresson, Bernard Plossu et Didier Ben Loulou, Jerusalem, Israel, 2015
- Galerie Malebranche avec Bernard Guillot, Le Caire Jérusalem, Paris, France, 2017
- Des amours silencieuses : carte blanche à Didier Ben Loulou, Yvelines Antiques, Paris, France, 2018
- Jérusalem, médiathèque, Berck-sur-Mer, France, 2018
- De la lettre à la vie, Galerie Gérard Lévy, Paris, France, 2019
- Sanguinaires, Galerie Quintessence, Paris, September 2020
- Mediterranean Flux, Naxos, Greece, September 2020
- Mémoire des lettres, Biennale Internationale d'Autun, Autun, France, July–August 2021
- Ce désert d'un premier matin du monde, La Non-Maison, Paris, France, January–February 2022
- Didier Ben Loulou / Photographies, librairie Alain Brieux, Paris, December 2022
- Sud, Galerie Mathieu Néouze, 75009 Paris, France, 13–22 December 2023
- Dialogue, North Africa Jewish heritage center, Jerusalem, March - June 2025
- Didier Ben Loulou / Photographies, Itinérances Foto, Sète, May - June 2025
- Alliance Infinity Love / In the Face of the Other, Deichtorhallen Hamburg, 5 June - 22 September 2026.

== Public Collections ==
- Museum of Fine Arts, Houston
- Victoria and Albert Museum, London
- Tel Aviv Museum of Art, Israel
- Fonds national d'art contemporain, Paris
- Bibliothèque nationale de France, Paris
- Musée d'Art et d'Histoire du Judaïsme, Paris
- Le château d’eau, pôle photographique de Toulouse, Toulouse, France
- Maison européenne de la photographie, Paris
- Fonds régional d'art contemporain de Basse-Normandie, France
- Société française de photographie, Paris
- Fonds d'acquisition départemental de l'Yonne, France
- Collectivité territoriale de Corse, Ajaccio, France
- Musée Nicéphore-Niépce, Chalon-sur-Saône, France
- Artothèques de Caen, Grenoble, Nantes, Auxerre et Vitré, France
- Espace Saint-Cyprien, Toulouse, France
- Hôtel de Varennes, Montpellier, France
- Musée de la photographie, Charleroi, Belgium
- Rheinisches Landesmuseum, Bonn, Germany
- Musée finlandais de la photographie, Helsinki, Finland
- Fondazione Italiana per la Fotografia, Turin, Italy
- Médiathèque, La Roche-sur-Yon, France
- Fondation Auer-Ory pour la photographie, Hermance, Switzerland
- Centre méditerranéen de la photographie, Bastia, France

== Bibliography ==
- 50 ans de photographie française de 1970 à nos jours, par Michel Poivert, Éditions Textuel, 2019, ISBN 978-2-84597-788-4
- Conversations 2, par Rémi Coignet, The Eyes Publishing, 2016, ISBN 979-1092727197
- Personal Choices. The Story of a Collection. Photographs of Palestine, Eretz Israel, Vivienne Silver-Brody, ISBN 978-965-7790-68-7
