= Eugene L. Didier =

American writer (1838–1913)

Eugene LeMoine Didier (December 22, 1838 – September 8, 1913) was an American writer and a recognized authority on Edgar Allan Poe.

== Biography ==
Eugene Didier, son of Franklin James Didier and Julia LeMoine, was born in Baltimore, where he lived all his life. He started his literary career in 1867 as editor of The Southern Society and contributed many articles to other magazines such as Scribner's Monthly, The Century Magazine, Catholic World and Harper's Monthly. From 1869 to 1870 he was Deputy Marshal of the Supreme Court. In 1873 he married Mary Louisa Innocentia Northrop, daughter of the Confederate General Lucius B. Northrop, who was at West Point during the time Edgar Poe attended the Military Academy.

Didier died in 1913 at the age of 75.

== Works ==
- The Life and Poems of Edgar Allan Poe (1877).
- American Publishers and English Authors (as Stylus, 1879).
- The Life and Letters of Madame Bonaparte (1879).
- A Primer of Criticism (1883).
- The Political Adventures of James G. Blaine (1884).
- The Truth about Edgar A. Poe (1903).
- The Poe Cult (1909).

Selected articles

- "The Grave of Poe," Appletons' Journal, Vol. 7, No. 148, 1872.
- "An Evening with Sothern," Appleton's Journal, Vol. 7, No. 168, 1872.
- "Peculiarities of Handwriting," Appleton's Journal, Vol. 8, No. 190, 1872.
- "An American Catholic Poet," The Catholic World, Vol. 33, No. 194, 1881.
- "The Anti-Catholic Spirit of Certain Writers," The Catholic World, Vol. 36, No. 215, 1883.
- "The Piety of the French People," The Catholic World, Vol. 40, No. 235, 1884.
- "Aaron Burr as a Lawyer," The Green Bag, Vol. 14, No. 10, 1902.
- "Thomas Jefferson as a Lawyer," The Green Bag, Vol. 15, No. 4, 1903.
- "Stephen A. Douglas as a Lawyer," The Green Bag, Vol. 15, No. 10, 1903.
- "Patrick Henry as a Lawyer," The Green Bag, Vol. 16, No. 2, 1904.
- "Francis Scott Key as a Lawyer," The Green Bag, Vol. 16, No. 5, 1904.
- "Lewis Cass as a Lawyer," The Green Bag, Vol. 16, No. 9, 1904.
- "James Buchanan as a Lawyer," The Green Bag, Vol. 16, No. 10, 1904.
- "William H. Seward as a Lawyer," The Green Bag, Vol. 17, No. 1, 1905.
