= Didier Ruef =

Swiss documentary photographer (born 1961)

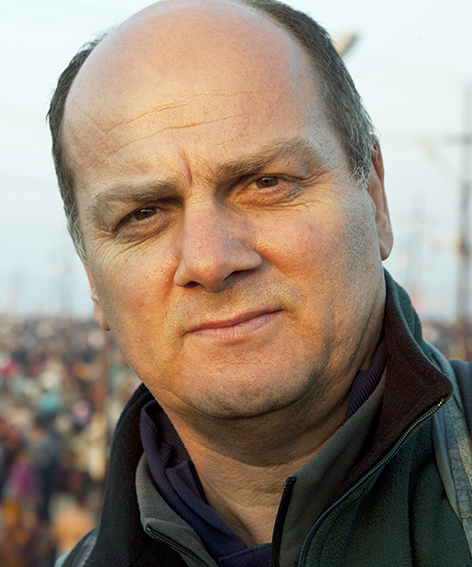
- Born: Didier Ruef; July 15, 1961 (age 65); Geneva, Switzerland
- Education: ICP International Center of Photography
- Alma mater: University of Geneva (Bachelor of Economics)
- Occupation: Documentary Photographer
- Website: http://www.didierruef.com

Didier Ruef (born 1961) is a Swiss documentary photographer best known for his portrayal of man and waste, recycle and sustainability, Africa, man and animals, Swiss alpine farmers and contemporary Switzerland.

== Life and career ==
Didier Ruef was born in Geneva, Switzerland on July 15, 1961. He graduated from the University of Geneva, where he studied Economics (1981–1984).

In 1985, Ruef went to New York, where he obtained a diploma (1986) in photojournalism at the International Center of Photography (ICP). It was there that he developed his long-term essay of the life of a Puerto Rican family in Spanish Harlem, for which he won the Yann Geoffroy Prize in Milan in 1990. These photographs were exhibited at the Musée de l'Élysée in Lausanne, Switzerland, in 1990.

Since returning to Switzerland in 1987, Ruef started to work as a freelance documentary photographer and photojournalist and has visited all five continents, with a preference for Africa. He has worked on various stories on the human condition in black & white and color.

Ruef was a member of Network Photographers Agency in London from 1991 to 1997. He was a founding member in September 2002 of the Swiss photo agency, Pixsil, which he left in July 2009. Today he works as a freelance photographer, but he is also represented worldwide by the photo agencies Luz Photo Agency, Visum Foto and Redux Pictures.

Ruef has worked with Médecins Sans Frontières, the Global Fund to fight AIDS, tuberculosis and malaria, Heks (Interchurch Aid), Swiss Red Cross, the Syngenta Foundation and the World Council of Churches.

Ruef's pictures are published in numerous magazines and newspapers in Europe, Asia and Northern America.

He won the King Albert Memorial Foundation Prize in 2000 for his book on Swiss mountain farmers (Bauern am Berg, Paysans de nos montagnes, Vita di montagna). This award, among other prizes, was the culmination of a long-term personal project which began in 1993 and completed in 1997. It was made possible with the support of Pro Helvetia for the photography and book in 1998, and an itinerant exhibition which toured Switzerland, Italy, Singapore and Jordan between 1999 and 2002.

In 2000 and 2001, Ruef was commissioned by the Swiss branch of Médecins Sans Frontières (MSF) for an extensive photographic report on daily life in six African countries. These pictures, together with those from numerous other African essays form the basis of a book Afrique Noire, published in 2005. An itinerant exhibition toured Switzerland and France between 2005 and 2007.

In 2007, he was commissioned by the Swiss Foundation DiDé, Dignité en Détention, for a book Enfants Prisonniers on the minors' jail in Gitarama, Rwanda.

From 1991 to 2011, he has also been involved in a personal project worldwide on the relationship between Man and Waste. He has shot twenty photo essays and has finally published in 2011 the book Recycle, Labor et Fides (French-English) and Edizioni Casagrande (Italian-German). In 2018, he has published the book Homo Helveticus by Till Schaap Edition on his beloved country Switzerland.

In 2021, he has published the book 2020. by Till Schaap Edition in which he shot a picture a day - 366 images - during the entire 2020 year.

== Awards ==
- Swiss Press Photo 21. Third prize for the Swiss Stories. 2021
- Deutscher Fotobuchpreis. Nomination 2012
- Swiss Press Photo. First prize for the foreign section. 2006
- Fujifilm Euro Press Photo Awards. Swiss prize for the technique section. 2004
- Swiss Press Photo. First prize for the foreign section. 2003
- Swiss Press Photo. First and third prizes for the foreign section. 2002
- King Albert Mountain Award for the book Bauern am Berg, OZV Offizin Zürich Verlag. Switzerland. 2000
- Schweizerische Arbeitsgemeinschaft für die Berggebiete (SAB) Switzerland for the book Bauern am Berg OZV Offizin Zürich Verlag. Switzerland. 1999
- Passy's mountain book fair, France, for the book Paysans de nos montagnes, Editions Monographic. 1999
- Honorable mention. UNESCO. Japan. 1993
- Applied Arts Magazine Awards Annual. USA. 1993
- Third black&white prize. Nikon International. Japan. 1991
- Yann Geoffroy. Agenzia Grazia Neri. Milan. Italy. 1990
- Second color prize. Nikon International. Japan. 1989
- Grand Prix. L'Illustré. Switzerland. 1983

== Books ==
- 2020. Till Schaap Edition. Switzerland. 2021
- Homo Helveticus. Till Schaap Edition. Switzerland. 2018
- Iași – Puncte de vedere. Iași Editura Muzeelor Literare.Iași. Romania. 2015
- Afrika, letzte Hoffnung. (Reprint with a new book cover). Pier Paolo Pasolini. Mit Fotografien von Didier Ruef. Corso. Hamburg. Germany. 2015
- Bestiarium. QTI. Stabio. Switzerland. 2012
- Afrika, letzte Hoffnung. Corso. Hamburg. Germany. 2011
- Recycle. Labor et Fides. Switzerland. 2011
- Recycle. Casagrande Edizioni. Switzerland. 2011
- Enfants Prisonniers. Fondation DiDé, Dignité en Détention. Geneva. Switzerland. 2007
- Afrique Noire. Infolio Editions. Switzerland. 2005
- Tausendundein Krieg. NP Buchverlag. Austria. 2004
- Vita di montagna Edizioni Casagrande. Switzerland. 1998
- Paysans de nos montagnes. Editions Monographic. Switzerland. 1998
- Bauern am Berg OZV Offizin Zürich Verlag. Switzerland. 1998
- Weltenblicke. Reportagefotografie und ihre Medien OZV Offizin Zürich Verlag. Switzerland.1997

== Collections ==
- Black Gold Museum. Riyadh, Kingdom of Saudia
- Collezione della Republica e Cantone Ticino. Switzerland.
- Collection Charles-Henri Favrod, Saint-Prex. Switzerland.
- Fonds cantonal d’art contemporain, Geneva. Switzerland.
- Fondation MAST, Bologna, Italy
- Fonds pour la photographie, Geneva. Switzerland.
- Musée de l'Élysée, Lausanne, Switzerland.
- Museo Casa Cavalier Pellanda. Biasca. Switzerland.
- Schweizerische Stiftung für die Photographie, Zürich. Switzerland.

== Exhibits ==
Individuals

- 1990
  - Médecins Sans Frontières in Uganda. Maison du Grütli, Geneva. Switzerland.
- 1991
  - Spanish Harlem. Family Life. Musée de l'Élysée, Lausanne. Switzerland.
- 1993
  - Gens de la Voirie. MJC St.-Gervais, Geneva. Switzerland.
- 1998
  - Bauern am Berg. Völkerkundemuseum, Zürich. Switzerland.
- 1999
  - Vita di montagna. Castelgrande, Bellinzona. Switzerland.
  - "Paysans de nos montagnes." Caves de la maison de Courten, Sierre (Switzerland).
- 2000
  - Bauern am Berg. Museo Nazionale del San Gottardo. Switzerland.
  - Paysans de nos montagnes. Galerie Focale, Nyon. Switzerland.
- 2001
  - Paysans de montagnes. The Substation. Singapore.
  - Vita di montagna. CCS Centro Culturale Svizzero, Milan. Italy.
  - Vita di montagna. Forte di Nago, Torbole. Italy.
- 2002
  - Mountain farming. The Jordan National Gallery of Fine Arts, Amman. Jordan.
- 2005
  - Africa Nera. Museo d’arte, Mendrisio. Switzerland
  - Afrique Noire. Galerie Focale, Nyon. Switzerland.
  - Schwarzafrica. Coalmine Gallery, Winterthur. Switzerland.
- 2006
  - Afrique Noire. Itinéraires des Photographes Voyageurs, Bibliothèque Municipale, Bordeaux. France.
- 2007
  - Afrique Noire. Völkerkundemuseum. Zürich. Switzerland.
- 2013
  - Animals' World. Leica Gallery. Zingst. Germany.
- 2014
  - Animals' World. Leica Galerie Salzburg, Austria
  - Les déchets dans le monde. Printemps de l'environnement: réduisons, réutilisons, recyclons. Ville de Palaiseau. France.
- 2016
  - 72 boulevard des écorchés. Cité Séniors, Geneva. Switzerland
- 2019
  - Homo Helveticus. Artespressione Gallery, Milan. Italy.

Group

- 1986
  - Central Park. New York. USA.
- 1988
  - Triennale internationale de la Photographie. Fribourg. Switzerland.
- 1991
  - Voir la Suisse Autrement. Switzerland's 700rd Anniversary. Fribourg. Switzerland.
- 1993
  - World Press Photo. World Tour.
  - Picture Freedom. Photographers Gallery, London. England.
- 1994
  - Migracoes. Museu da Imagem e do Som (MIS), São Paulo. Brazil.
  - UNESCO / Accu . World Tour.
- 1997
  - Weltenblicke. Reportagefotografie und ihre Medien. Fotomuseum Winterthur. Switzerland.
  - De Ketting V. Photofestival Noorderlicht, Ja Groningen. The Netherlands.
- 1999
  - O seculo do corpo. Trabalhos fotograficos 1990–1999. Culturgest, Lisbonne. Portugal.
- 2003
  - Objective : People's world. WHO, Tirana. Albania.
  - Le monde selon Focale . Villa Dutoit, Geneva. Switzerland.
- 2006
  - Switzerland by Focale's photographers. La Gallerie Photo, Montpellier. France.
  - Liberté, Freiheit, Libertà. Reporters Sans Frontières (RSF). Travelling exhibit around Switzerland.
- 2007
  - Focale's 25 years . Château de Nyon. Switzerland.
  - Malnutrition's sensibilisation. Médecins Sans Frontières France. Lille. France.
- 2010
  - Black Africa – Rwanda, Enfants Prisonniers. 10th Shanghai International Photographic Art Exhibition. Exhibition Center of Shanghai. China.
- 2011
  - Un mondo di persone (Objective : People's world. WHO). Spazio Villas, Parco di San Giovanni. Trieste. Italy.
- 2012
  - 12x7. Museo Casa Cavalier Pellanda. Biasca. Switzerland.
  - Vestiges. Le Manoir de la Ville de Martigny. Switzerland.
- 2013
  - Collection Charles-Henri Favrod. Saint-Imier Museum. Switzerland.
  - Bestiarium. Umweltfotofestival Horizonte Zingst. Germany.
  - Des Images pour la liberté d’expression. RSF (Reporters Sans frontières). SIG. Geneva. Switzerland.
  - Des Images pour la liberté d’expression. RSF (Reporters Sans frontières). LuganoPhotoDays. Lugano. Switzerland.
- 2014
  - Recycle. Umweltfotofestival Horizonte Zingst. Germany.
  - Rwanda. Minors in detention. LuganoPhotosDays. October 17–26. Lugano. Switzerland.
- 2015
  - Sonntag Nachmittag in der Schweiz. Seebad Seewesen. Switzerland.
  - Recycled. Villa Dutoit. Geneva. Switzerland.
- 2016
  - Révélations. Photographies à Genève. Musée Rath. Geneva. Switzerland.
- 2017
  - Sulle vie dell'illuminazione Il mito dell'India nella cultura occidentale 1808–2017. MASI Lugano. Switzerland.
- 2019
  - Homo Helveticus. Umweltfotofestival Horizonte Zingst. Germany.

== Lectures ==
- 20 October 2026. "Build your own vision". B612 Photo Hub (in English). Novi Sad, Serbia.
- 7 October 2021. "2020". Musée de l'appareil photographique, Vevey (in French). Musée de l'appareil photographique, Vevey. Switzerland.
- 1 October 2021. "2020". Photobastei (in German). Photobastei Zürich, Switzerland.
- 30 September 2021. "2020". BelleVue - Ort for Fotografie (in English). Basel, Switzerland.
- 15 June 2019. "Homo Helveticus". Carona Immagina (in Italian). Ticino, Switzerland.
- 30 May 2019. "Homo Helveticus". Umweltfotofestival Horizonte Zingst (in German). Germany.
- 13 April 2019. "Recycle". Festival dell’Ambiente e della sostenibilità (in Italian). Verdi Theatre. Milan. Italy.
- 11 April 2019. "Homo Helveticus". (in French). Société de Lecture. Geneva, Switzerland..
- 29 March 2019. "Reporters Unplugged". Festival Histoire et Cité. Uni Dufour, salle U600 (in French). Geneva. Switzerland.
- 12 December 2018. "Vita di Montagna". Festival letterario "Leggere le Montagne" (in Italian). Verdi Theatre. Milan. Italy.
- 12 November 2018. "Sostenibilità nel prisma della fotografia". Università degli studi di Milano (in Italian). Milan. Italy.
- 21 September 2016. "Sostenibilità e fotografia" with Roberto Antonini (RSI journalist). LuganoPhotoDays (in Italian). Lugano. Switzerland.
- 31 October 2015. "Recycle". Villa Dutoit (in French). Geneva. Switzerland.
- 16 October 2013. "Recycle". LuganoPhotoDays (in Italian). Lugano. Switzerland.
- 27 October 2012. "Fotogiornalismo oggi". Museo Casa Cavalier Pellanda (in Italian). Biasca. Switzerland.
- 3 April 2012. "Recycle". Société de lecture (in French). Geneva. Switzerland.
- 26 October 2011. "Recycle". International Center of Photography (in English). New York City. USA
- 6 October 2011. "Recycle". Lecture for the participants of Unigestion Client conference (in English). Unigestion is a leading independent asset manager. Vevey. Switzerland
- 7 May 2011. "Recycle". Chiasso Letteraria (in Italian). Galleria Cons Arc. Switzerland.
- 5 April 2011. "The meaning of photography today" (in German). Canon Switzerland. "Händler Schulung Programm". Zürich. Switzerland.
- 22 and 29 September 2010. "A personal view on being a photographer" (in French). Canon Switzerland. "Creative Days Lausanne and Geneva". Switzerland.

== Workshops ==
- 2025
  - "Street Photography". Istanbul, Turkey. April 12-19.
  - "Carnaval in Mindelo". São Vicente, Capo Verde. Leica Akademie Switzerland. February 28 - March 8.
- 2024
  - "Street photography". Albania. September 28 - October 6.
  - "De Saint-Louis à Dakar ». Senegal. June 13-23.
- 2022
  - "Fête de la musique". Leica Akademie Switzerland. Geneva, Switzerland. June 25.
- 2018
  - Albania. Travel workshop. May 19–27. Albania.
  - L'art de l'editing photographique. Leica Akademie Switzerland. Humanit’Art gallery. September 1. Geneva. Switzerland.
  - Italy. Apulia and Matera. Travel workshop. December 5–9. Italy.
- 2017
  - Master Class at "Academy of Arts, University of Novi Sad". April 26–27. Novi Sad. Serbia.
- 2016
  - LuganoPhotosDays. "Visual Storytelling. The art of reportage". November 12–13. Lugano. Switzerland.
- 2015
  - Master Class at "MAZ". March 2–6. Five days. Luzern. Switzerland.
- 2014
  - Fotofestival Horizonte Zings. "Fotografie mit einem Augenzwinkern". May 28–29. Zingst. Germany.
  - LuganoPhotosDays. "Documentary Photography: Just be yourself." October 18–19/25-26. Four days. Lugano. Switzerland.
- 2013
  - LuganoPhotosDays. October 12–17. Five days. Lugano. Switzerland.
- 2005
  - University of Tulsa. "Photojournalism" October 2005. Three days. University of Tulsa. Photo department. Oklahoma. USA.
  - CEPV. "Photojournalism". Spring 2005. Five days. Centre d’Enseignement Professionel Vevey (CEPV). Switzerland
- 2002
  - Amman."Photojournalism". One day at The Jordan National Gallery of Fine Arts Amman. Jordan.
