= Didier Kamanzi =

Burundi–born Rwandan actor

- Born: Didier Kamanzi; Burundi
- Occupations: Actor, Rugby player
- Years active: 2006–present
- Awards: Best Actor, Rwandan movie awards.

Didier Kamanzi, is a Rwandan actor. One of the most popular actors in Rwandan cinema, Kamanzi is best known for the roles in the films Rwasa, Rwassibo and Catherine.

Apart from acting, he is also a player in the Rwanda national rugby union team.

== Personal life ==
He was born in 1994 in Burundi. After the Rwandan genocide, he moved to Rwanda and attended high school. He briefly worked as a bouncer at a night club for a few months.

== Career ==
While he worked as a bouncer in the night club, he got an offer to audition for a film. He went to the audition and he got the role.

In 2015, he received the award for the Best actor at the Rwandan movie awards.

== Partial filmography ==
Year	Film	Role	Genre	Ref.
2016	Mutoni	Rusangwa	TV series	
2014	Umurabyo		Film	
