= Didier Trono =

Swiss virologist

Professor Didier Trono
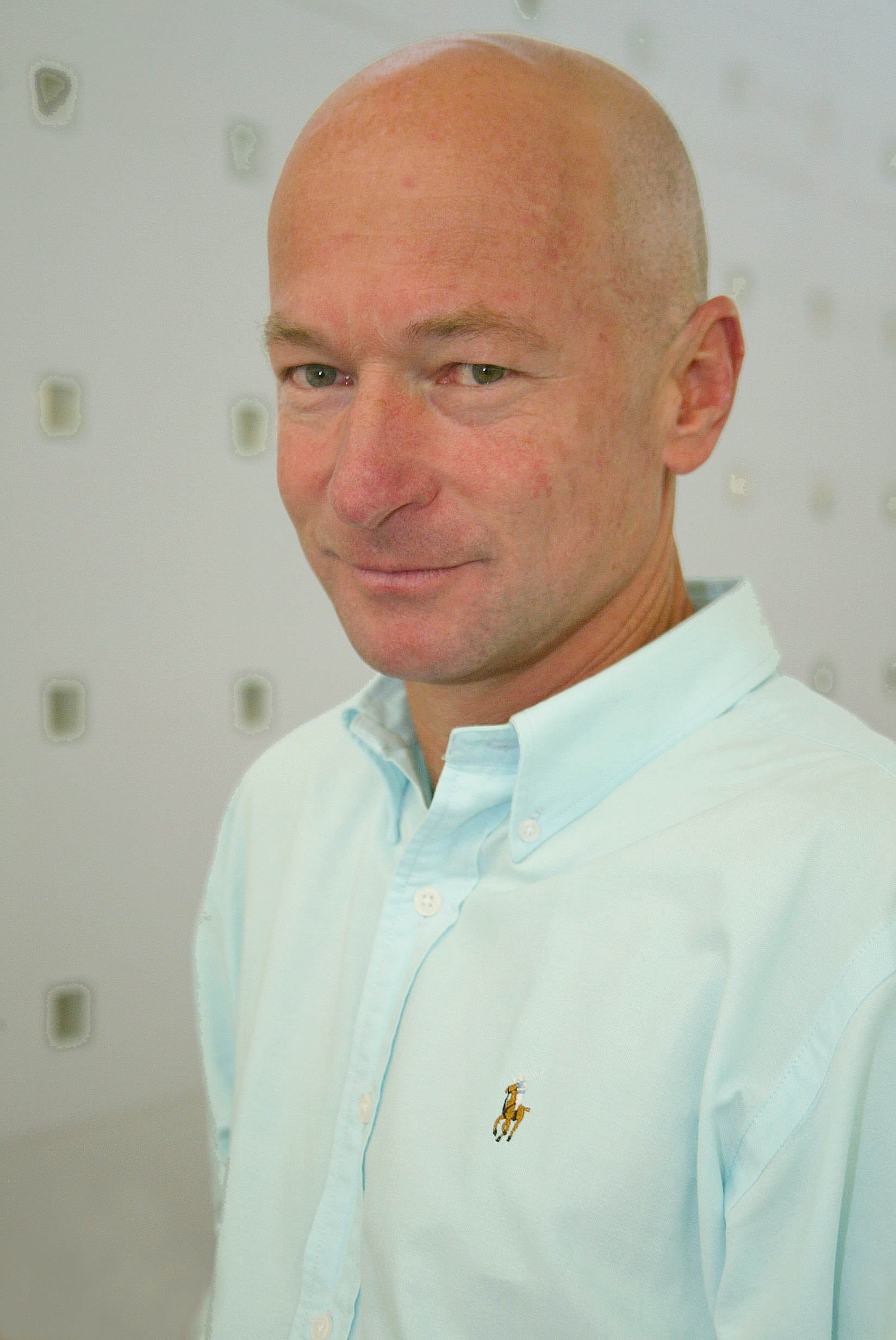
- Didier Trono in 2004
- Born: 1956 (age 69–70)

Academic background
- Education: University of Geneva

Academic work
- Discipline: Virology
- Sub-discipline: Epigenetics
- Institutions: École Polytechnique Fédérale de Lausanne (EPFL)
- Main interests: Zinc finger proteins, KRAB proteins, Transposons,
- Website: https://www.epfl.ch/labs/tronolab/

Didier Trono (born 1956) is a Swiss virologist and a professor at the École Polytechnique Fédérale de Lausanne (EPFL). He is known for his research on virus-host interactions and the development of lentiviral vectors for gene therapy.

== Career ==
Trono obtained an M.D. from the University of Geneva in 1982 and completed a clinical training in internal medicine, pathology and infectious diseases in Geneva and at the Massachusetts General Hospital, Boston. Trono started his scientific career in 1986 when he joined David Baltimore's laboratory at the Whitehead Institute for Biomedical Research as a postdoctoral researcher, where he studied the molecular mechanisms linked to poliovirus and HIV pathogenesis. In 1990, he was appointed assistant professor at the Salk Institute for Biological Studies, where he founded a center for AIDS research. There, he notably contributed to the understanding of why HIV specifically infects human T helper cells, and developed a new class of gene therapy vectors based on HIV capable of infecting non-dividing cells that have since then been widely used in clinical and research settings. In 1997, he was appointed full professor at the University of Geneva, where he was named head of the Department of Genetics and Microbiology in 2000. In 2004, he was appointed full professor at EPFL, where he was dean of the School of Life Sciences until 2012. He also served on the Life Sciences jury for the Infosys Prize in 2010.

In 2016, Trono cofounded the Health 2030 initiative, a Swiss multicentric and multidisciplinary program which aims at promoting the development and exploitation of new technologies in the field of health and personalized medicine.

== Research ==
Trono heads the Laboratory of Virology and Genetics at EPFL. Despite a longstanding interests in the biology of viruses and viral infections, research in Trono's lab at EPFL has shifted towards the study of mobile genetic elements called transposons and their role in the regulation of mammalian gene expression. Trono and colleagues have notably taken interest in the 'KRAB'n'KAP' system, a complex interaction network of some 400 KRAB-containing zinc finger proteins and their cofactor KAP1, which is notably involved in the epigenetic regulation of retroelements and which regulates critical gene expression programs during embryonic development.

== Distinctions ==
In 2002, Trono was awarded the Leenaards Scientific Prize for his contributions to the understanding of the genetic factors of vulnerability towards HIV infections.

Trono was elected as an EMBO member in 2009.

Trono was awarded with two Advanced Grants from the European Research Council in 2010 and 2015 for projects on mammalian gene regulation by KRAB proteins and transposable elements. He also received a Proof of Concept grant in 2016 for the development of a novel diagnostic method based on the analysis of transposable elements.
