= Didier Dietschi =

Swiss dentist

- Born: Switzerland
- Occupations: Dentist, academic
- Known for: Natural Layering Concept; Immediate Dentin Sealing; Cervical Margin Relocation; Cavity Design Optimization

Notes
- Current President of the European Academy of Esthetic Dentistry (EAED)

Didier Dietschi is a Swiss dentist and academic known for his research in restorative and aesthetic dentistry. He is a Senior Lecturer at the University of Geneva and, as of 2025, serves as the President of the European Academy of Esthetic Dentistry (EAED). Dietschi is recognized for his contributions to biomimetic adhesive dentistry, specifically the development of the Natural Layering Concept and clinical protocols for indirect posterior restorations.

== Education and academic career ==
Dietschi completed his dental studies at the University of Geneva, earning his license in 1984 and a doctorate in 1988. In 2003, he received a PhD from the Academic Centre for Dentistry Amsterdam (ACTA), which is part of the University of Amsterdam.

The University of Geneva appointed him as a Privat-Docent in 2004. Throughout his career, he has held several teaching positions at the institution, rising to the rank of Senior Lecturer. He also serves as an adjunct professor at Case Western Reserve University in Cleveland, Ohio.

== Publications and research ==
Dietschi has authored or co-authored over 100 publications in peer-reviewed journals. As of 2026, he has 87 articles indexed in PubMed, and his research has received over 9,900 citations with an h-index of 49 according to Google Scholar. He co-authored the book Adhesive Metal-free Restorations (Quintessence, 1997), which was translated into seven languages, and authored Tooth Wear - Interceptive treatment approach with minimally invasive protocols (Quintessence, 2023).

In 1995, he introduced the Natural Layering Concept, formally published in 1997, which simplified previous direct composite restorations techniques into a biomimetic, bilaminar system utilizing a separate dentin layer for the restoration's base color and opacity, and an enamel layer for the restoration's brightness and translucency.

In 1997 and 1998, Dietschi and Roberto Spreafico introduced a series of treatment protocols for partial indirect posterior restorations. Subsequent research provided support for these concepts, which comprise three core elements: Immediate Dentin Sealing (IDS) for Class II indirect restorations to protect the dentin surface and reduce tooth sensitivity while improving bond strength and stability, Cavity Design Optimization (CDO) to regularize cavity geometry with flowable composite while minimizing tissue removal, and Cervical Margin Relocation (CMR) to manage deep proximal preparations presenting isolation and impression challenges.

== Professional engagements and affiliations ==
In 1990, Dietschi established a private practice in Geneva, which later became the Geneva Smile Center. Alongside his clinical work, he conducts theoretical and practical continuing education courses worldwide on adhesive and aesthetic restorations.

He is the current President of the European Academy of Esthetic Dentistry (EAED) for the 2025–2027 term. On the industry side, his research led to a collaboration with Edelweiss DR to develop the Inspiro composite system, designed specifically to apply the bilaminar principles of his Natural Layering Concept.
