= Didier Mouron =

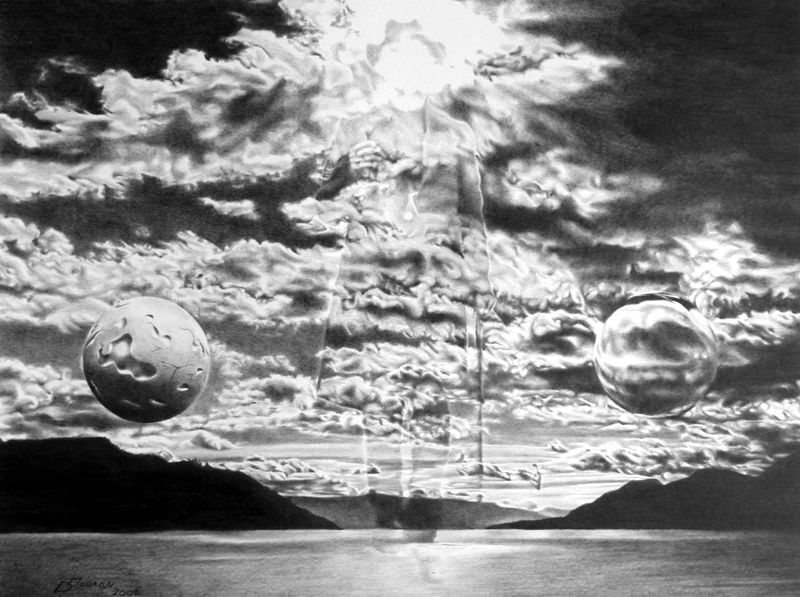
Jesrad, 2006

Didier Mouron (born 3 July 1958) is a Swiss artist (naturalized Canadian). He was born in Vevey. Didier Mouron has been called "The king of the pencil".

== Selective exhibitions since 1976 ==
- Galerie Henry Meyer, Lausanne, Switzerland
- Galerie du Vieux-Port, Québec, Canada
- Kristen Richards Gallery (Trump Tower), New York, US
- Private exhibition at Donald Trump, New York, US
- Mason Art, New York, US
- Mandel & Co, Chicago, US
- The Bardufi Collection, Phoenix, US
- Designer Showcase, Dallas, US
- L.I.D. Fine Arts, Warren (New Jersey), US
- Galerie du Matterhorn, Zermatt, Switzerland
- E.G. Cody, Miami, US
- Pacific Design Center, Los Angeles, US
- Atelier-galerie Didier Mouron, Mt-Pèlerin, Switzerland
- Sitag, Geneva, Switzerland
- Galerie Cazanove, Pointe-à-Pitre, Guadeloupe
- Westin Mont-Royal, "Ouvertures", Montréal, Canada
- Le Parc, "Ouvertures", Mt Pèlerin, Switzerland
- S.B.S, "Ouvertures", Montréal, Canada
- Museum of the Military Aviation, Payerne, Switzerland
- Espace Arlaud, Lausanne, Switzerland
- Expositions sauvages "Off-the-Wall", US, Canada
- Emily Hill, Singapore
- Forbidden City, Beijing, China
- Guangzhou Baiyun International Convention Center, Guangzhou, China
- "The dreams of Mouron", Warner Bros, Los Angeles, US

== Important works ==
- La Marée Descendante, 1985, 74 x 38 cm
- Rencontre avec Déméter, 1985, 52 x 68 cm
- Toujours en Vie, 1992, 50 x 39 cm
- Le Judgement de Pâris I, 2005, 84 x 38 cm
- Jesrad, 2005, 36 x 27 cm
- La Chambre, 2008, 35 x 27 cm
- Combien étaient-ils ?, 2011, 70 x 50 cm

== Publications ==
- Didier Mouron, Artal Editions, Switzerland
- Words, Images, Primavesi Editions, Canada

== Filmography ==
- Dreams of Mouron, Produced in Warner Bros Studios (Burbank, California)
