= Didier Guérin =

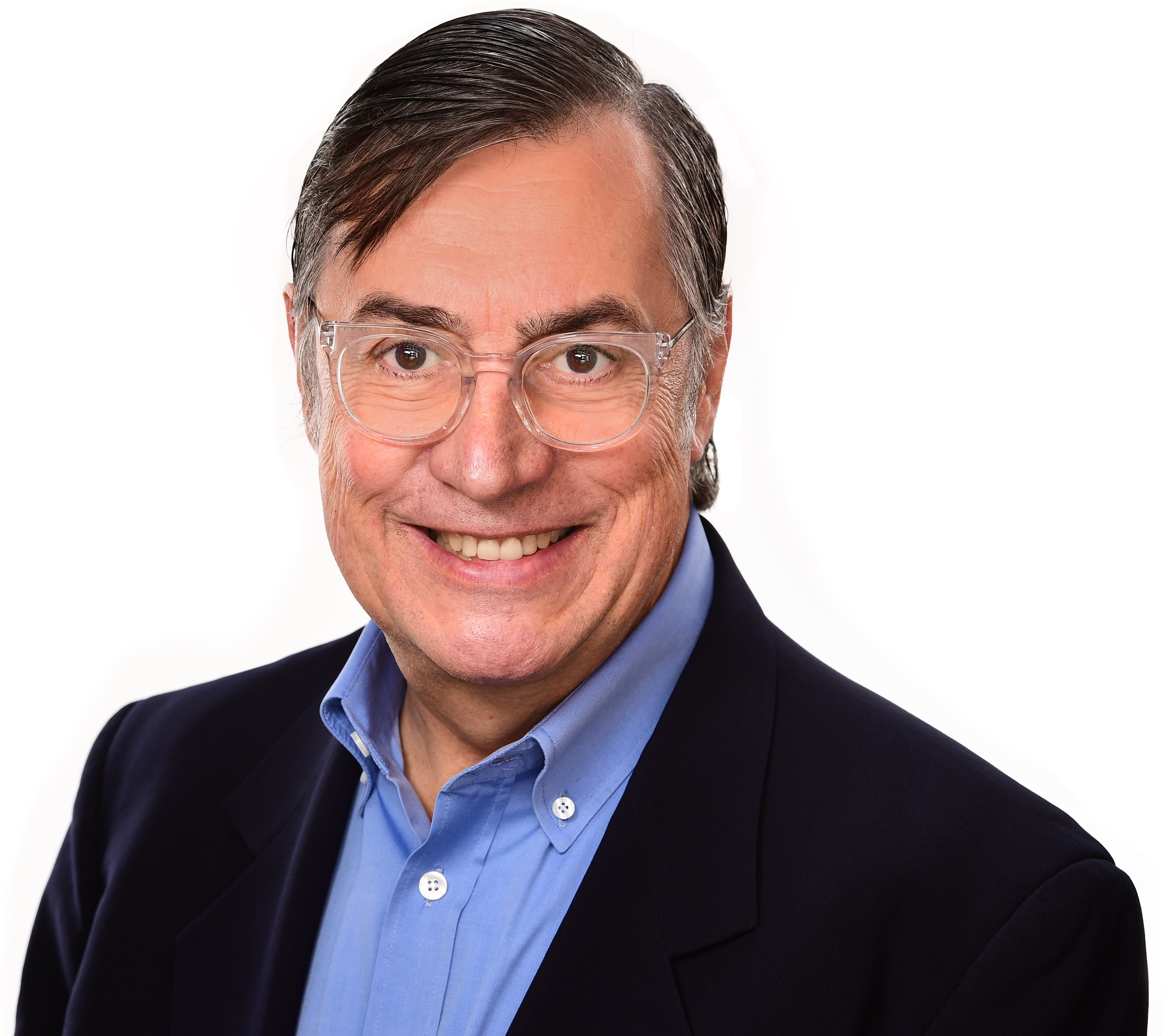
- Portrait of Guérin
- Born: 2 August 1950 (age 75)
- Occupations: President and CEO of Media Convergence Asia-Pacific

Didier Jean Guy Guérin (French pronunciation: [didje ʒɑ̃ ɡi ɡeʁɛ̃]; born 2 August 1950) is a Franco-Australian magazine media executive and consultant who has directed the launch and management of about 40 media products, including 30 new magazines with digital applications in Asia-Pacific. His career has taken him from Paris to New York and thence to Australia and all the major cities in East Asia.

He has worked with almost all the main magazine publishing companies in Europe, the United States, Australia and Asia and now runs a consulting business, Media Convergence Asia-Pacific.

He is best known for having launched ELLE magazine in the US in 1985 on behalf of the Hachette Filipacchi-News Corp joint venture, followed by a succession of similar launches in Australia and Asia.

Guérin joined Condé Nast in 1995 at the invitation of publisher Jonathan Newhouse, and successfully launched local editions of VOGUE in Japan, Taiwan and South Korea.

He founded consulting group Media Convergence Asia-Pacific (MCAP) in 2000 to assist media companies aiming to expand in the region. MCAP has offices in Sydney and Beijing.

== Education ==
- 1973 Bachelor of Arts, Communications, Paris II University
- 1973 Bachelor of Arts, Government Law, Paris II University
- 1975 Master of Arts, Journalism, Michigan State University, East Lansing, Michigan

== Business career ==
In 1975, Guérin joined political daily Le Bulletin Quotidien in Paris as a reporter and night editor after an internship in the US at Knight Ridder Newspapers in Washington, DC, and one at Le Monde in Paris.

His experience in the US took him to LOOK magazine in 1979 where he worked on magazine management with entrepreneur Daniel Filipacchi.

In 1983, he joined Hachette in Paris and moved back to New York to study the feasibility of establishing the French magazine ELLE in the US, which he launched in 1985 as co-President in a joint-venture with Rupert Murdoch’s News Corp.

In 1988, he identified and negotiated the US$812 million acquisition of Diamandis Communications, formerly CBS magazines, and became Executive Vice-President of Hachette-Filipacchi Magazines, Inc.

In 1991, he was appointed President and CEO of Hachette-Filipacchi Asia-Pacific, based in Sydney, and launched local editions of ELLE in Australia, Taiwan, South Korea, China, Hong Kong, Japan and Thailand.

In 1995. he became President and CEO of Condé Nast Asia-Pacific and launched VOGUE in Korea, Taiwan and Japan.

In 2000, he founded Media Convergence Asia-Pacific as President and CEO to manage the development of international media groups in Asia, including Marie-Claire Group, Hearst Magazines International (US), Net-A-Porter (UK), Arnoldo Mondadori Editore (Italy), Burda-Rizzoli (Germany/Italy), Le Figaro (France), and Australian Consolidated Press (Australia).

Guérin has served on the board of directors of more than ten companies in Europe and Asia, including Globecast Australia Pty Ltd in 2007 and more recently as Chairman of the Board of Scrunch LLC and Stylematch, Pty Ltd.

== Distinctions ==
In 2010, Guérin was awarded the Legion of Honour, France's highest award, by the President of France, in the rank of Chevalier.

== Personal life ==
In 1981, Guérin married Magie Moray, a professional dancer and actress in Paris. They lived in New York from 1983 to 1991 when they moved to Sydney, where their only son Didier Guy Guérin Jr. was born the same year.

Parents: Dr Jacques Guérin, Janine Guérin (née Vaesken), both deceased.

== Publications ==
Guérin is the author of about 30 articles and has been a speaker at various international conferences around the world held by groups such as the Fédération Internationale de la Presse Périodique (FIPP) the Magazine Publishers Association (MPA) and the World Association of Newspapers and News Publishers (WAN-IFRA).

Author of "FRONT ROW TO FRONT COVER: Inside the Business of International Fashion Magazines", July 2019, published by Mandevilla Press, Lakewood Ranch, Florida. More information on http://www.frontrowtofrontcover.com

== Memberships ==
Guérin is a member of the Australian Institute of Company Directors, the Asia Society and the Royal Sydney Golf Club.
