= Heinrich Didier =

American newspaper editor

Heinrich Didier was an American newspaper editor. He was an immigrant to the United States of America and was one of the editors of the Deutsche Schnellpost in 1850.
