= Didier Léandre Tsiajotso =

Malagasy politician

Didier Léandre Tsiajotso is a Malagasy politician. A member of the National Assembly of Madagascar, he was elected as a member of the Tiako i Madagasikara party; he represents the constituency of Antalaha in the 2007 Malagasy parliamentary elections. He lost his seat in the 2014 Malagasy parliamentary elections.
