= Didier Lucchesi =

French conductor (born 1970)

Didier Lucchesi (1970-2022) was a French conductor. He studied in the National Conservatory of Music (CNR) of Marseille.

In 1990 he received a conductor's gold medal. After that he joined the opera of Marseille. During that time he worked with top personalities and made himself familiar with a broad repertory. For a number of years, he was the musical director of the Soirées lyriques de Sanxay (Vienne, France).
