= Charles Didier =

Swiss writer and poet (1805–1864)

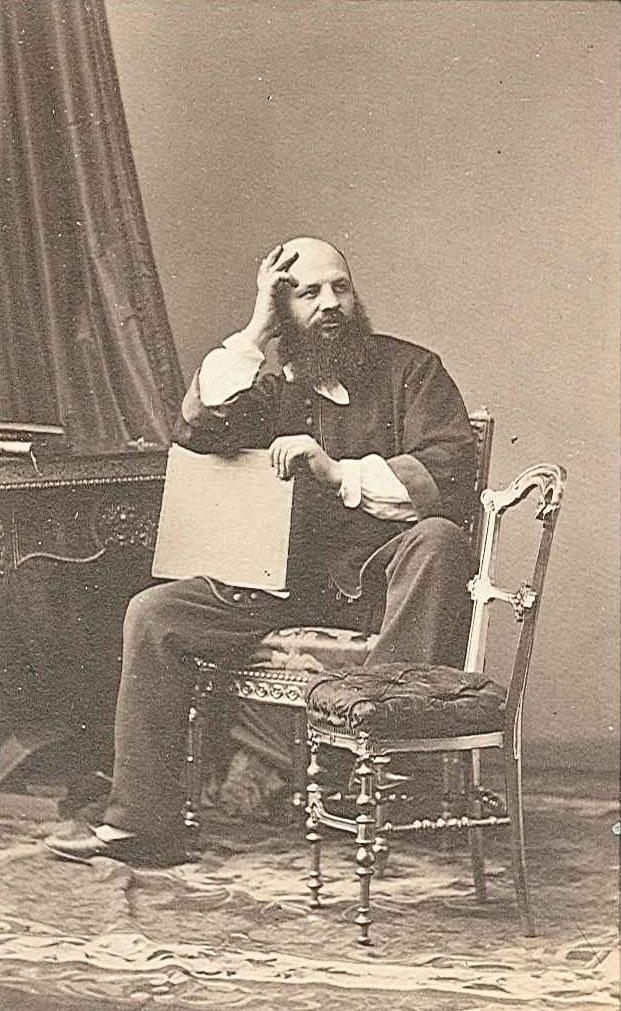
- Born: 15 September 1805; Geneva
- Died: 7 March 1864 (aged 58); Paris
- Occupations: Writer; Poet; Traveller

Charles Didier (15 September 1805 – 7 March 1864) was a Swiss writer, poet and traveller.

Charles Didier followed classic studies in Geneva, where he published two collections of poems, La Harpe helvétique (1825) and Mélodies helvétiques (1825).

In 1827, attracted by the myth of Italy, he decided to undertake a trip to the peninsula, where he went as a tutor. In 1829 his travels took him to Sicily.

On his return from Italy in 1830, he moved to Paris, where he became for a few years, George Sand's lover, "ill-married" and divorced from Casimir Dudevant, along with Michel de Bourges and the actor Bocage. Didier's article, however, failed to arouse wide interest among the French public, just as a short and dense article by a certain Theil, which appeared in 1837 in the newspaper La Paix, in which the author, "had spoken about Leopardi wonderfully, but before a distracted audience and in a place that was too unliterary," failed to do so six years later.

Prevented by impending blindness, to take the road to the East, Charles Didier ended his life by committing suicide March 7, 1864 in Paris after long suffering.

== Works ==
Poetry

- 1825: La Harpe helvétique
- 1825: Mélodies helvétiques

Novels

- 1833: Rome souterraine
- 1838: Chavornay
- 1844–45 Caroline en Sicile
- 1859: Les amours d'Italie

Travels

- 1837: Une année en Espagne
- 1842: Campagne de Rome
- 1844: Promenade au Maroc
- 1856: Cinq cents lieues sur le Nil

He also wrote reports for the Revue encyclopédique and the Revue des deux Mondes.
