= Didier Meslard =

French cyclist

Personal information
- Born: 14 January 1896
- Died: 25 August 1963 (aged 67)

Cycling career
- Sport: Cycling
- Role: Rider

Didier Meslard (14 January 1896 – 25 August 1963) was a French racing cyclist. He rode in the 1920 Tour de France.
