= Didier Ottinger =

French museum curator, art critic and author (born 1957)

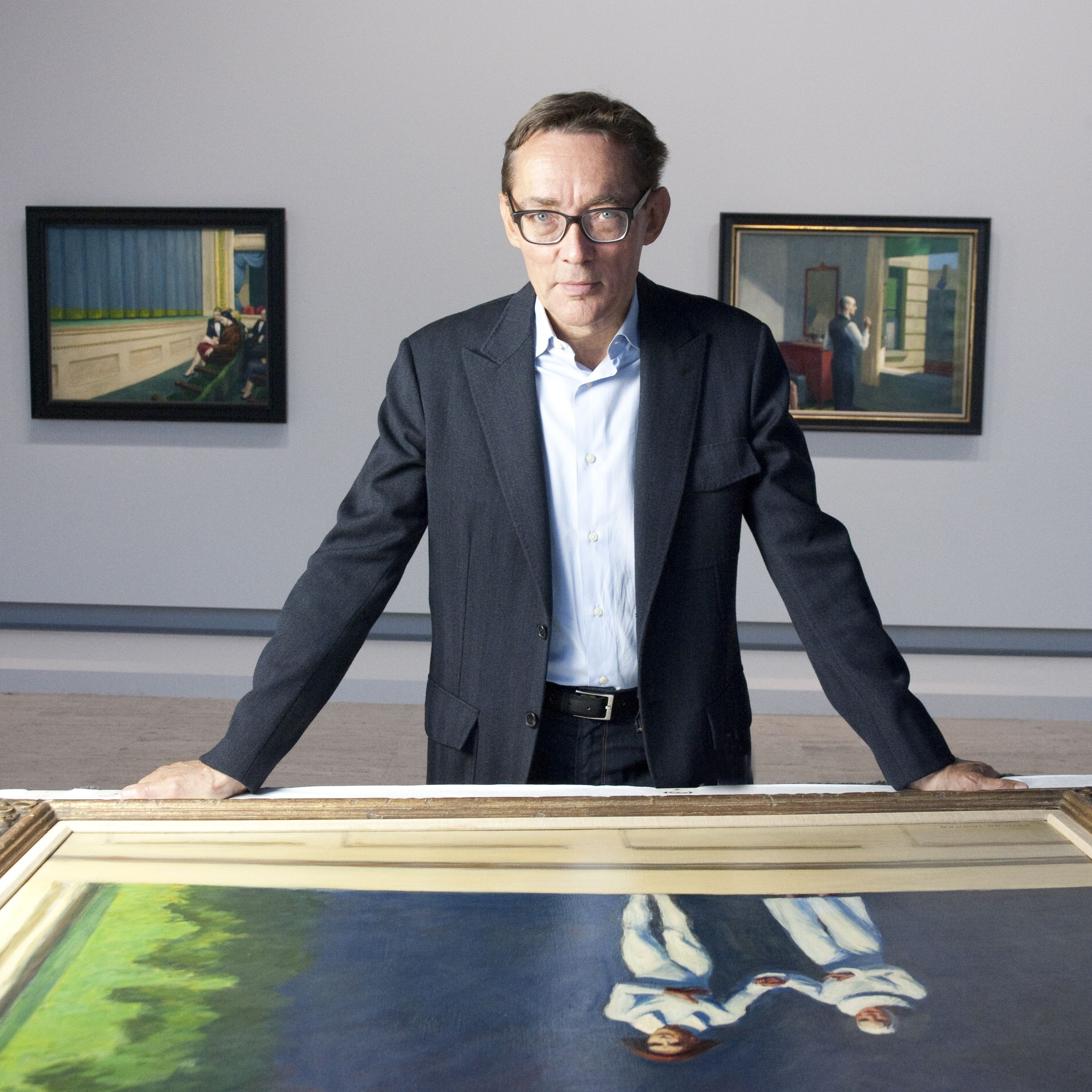
Didier Ottinger

Didier Ottinger, born in Nancy in 1957, is a French museum curator, art critic and author. He is known for organizing exhibitions and publishing books on modern and contemporary painting. He is now assistant director of the Centre Pompidou at the Musée national d'art moderne in Paris.

== Exhibitions and catalogs ==
1989-1994

- Programmation and organization of exhibitions at Musée de l’Abbaye Sainte Croix, Sables d’Olonne (« Georges Bataille » – « Georg Bazelitz » « Max Beckmann – « Victor Brauner » – « La Chair promise » – « Chaissac » – « Étienne-Martin » – « Philip Guston » – « Philippe Hortala » – « Jean-Michel Sanejouand » ...)

1995

- Co-curator of « Identity and Altérity : Figures of the Body 1895/1995 », centenaire de la Biennale de Venise, June 1st-October 15 oct., 1995. Publication management : Jean Clair

1996

- « Magritte », Montréal, Musée des Beaux-Arts, June 20-October 27, 1996.

1996-1997

- « The Deadly Sins », seven exhibitions, Paris, Musée national d’art moderne, Centre Pompidou, September 11, 1996- September 29, 1997

1997

- Co-curator at the Biennale of São Paulo

1999-2000

- Co-curator of « Cosmos. Du romantisme à l’avant-garde », Montréal, Musée des Beaux-Arts, June 17-October 17 // Barcelone, Centre de Cultura contemporània, 23 nov. 1999-20 févr. 2000 // Venise, Palazzo Grassi, 2000. Publication management : Jean Clair

1999

- « David Hockney. Espace/Paysage », Paris, Musée national d’art moderne, Centre Pompidou, January 27-April 26.
- « La Collection du Centre Pompidou. Un parcours au Musée d’Art Moderne de la Ville de Paris », Paris, Musée d’Art Modene de la Ville de Paris, June 18-September 19.
- « Primitive Passion », Avignon, Palais des Papes, May 21 mai-November 1.
- « David Hockney. Dialogue avec Picasso », Paris, Musée Picasso, February 10-May 3.

2000

- « Richard Hamilton-Marcel Duchamp. Eau et gaz à tous les étages », Paris, Musée national d’art moderne, Centre Pompidou, March 29-June 5.
- « Philip Guston. Peintures 1947-1979 », Paris, Musée national d’art moderne, Centre Pompidou, September 1-December 4.

2001

- « Primitive Passion », Avignon, Palais des Papes, May 2-November 1.
- « Gilles Aillaud : la jungle des villes », Monaco, Salle du quai Antoine 1er, July 14-September 9.

2002-2003

- « Beckmann », Paris, Musée national d’art moderne, Centre Pompidou, Galerie 1, September 10, 2002- January 6, 2003 // London, Tate Modern, February 13-May 5, 2003 // New York, MoMAQNS, June 25-September 30, 2003

2003-2004

- « Chimères, monstres et merveilles. De la mythologie aux biotechnologies », Monaco, Salle du quai Antoine 1er, October 17, 2003-January 4, 2004.

2004

- Co-curator « La Grande Parade. Portraits de l’artiste en clown », Paris, Galeries Nationales du Grand Palais, March 12-May 31 // Ottawa, Musée des Beaux-Arts du Canada, June 25-September 19. Publication management : Jean Clair.

2004-2005

- « Jean Hélion », Paris, Musée national d’art moderne, Centre Pompidou, December 8, 2004-March 6, 2005 // Barcelone, Museu Picasso, March 17-June 19, 2005 // New York, National Academy Museum, July 14-October 9, 2005.

2008

- Member of the scientific committee of the exhibition « Les Années 1930 : la fabrique de "l’homme nouveau" », Ottawa, Musée des Beaux-Arts du Canada, June 6-September 7.

2008-2009

- « Le Futurisme à Paris, une avant-garde explosive », Paris, Musée national d’art moderne, Centre Pompidou, Galerie 1, October 15, 2008-January 26, 2009 // Rome, Scuderie del Quirinale, February 20-May 24, 2009 // London, Tate Modern, June 12-September 20, 2009.

2009

- « La Force de l’art 2 (situation de l’art contemporain en France) », Paris, Nef du Grand Palais, April 24-June 1
- « Arcadie », Séoul (Corée), Musée d’Art modernede Séoul // Taïpei (Taïwan), Musée d’Art moderne de Taïpei.

2010

- « Dreamlands », Paris, Musée national d’art moderne, Centre Pompidou, Paris, Galerie 1, May 5-August 9.

2011

- « Le Surréalisme », Tokyo (Japon), The National Art Center, February 9-May 9.
- « Surrealism. The Poetry of Dreams », Brisbane (Australie), Queensland Art Gallery, June 11-October 2.

2012-2013

- « Edward Hopper », Paris, Galeries Nationales du Grand Palais, October 10, 2012- January 26, 2013.

2013-2014

- « Le Surréalisme et l’objet. La sculpture au défi », Paris, Musée national d’art moderne, Centre Pompidou, Galerie 1, October 30, 2013-March 3, 2014; Washington, Hirshhorn Museum of Sculpture Garden, April–August 2014.

== Publications (selection) ==
1991

- Catalogue of the works by Victor Brauner, musée de l’Abbaye Sainte-Croix, Les Sables d’Olonne
- "L’impossible peinture", Beaux Arts Magazine, Giacometti special edition

1992

- Jean Hélion (monography), musée national d’Art Moderne, Paris
- «William De Kooning», Beaux-Arts Magazine

1993

- «Sade au pays de Support-Surface», Beaux-Arts, n°110, p. 108
- «Gegen die Utopie malen», in exhibition catalogue Georg Baselitz, Städtische Galerie im Prinz Max Palais, Karlsruhe
- «Ne dites jamais "Fontaine…" », Omnibus, n°7
- «Marcel Duchamp. Révolution ou sabotage ? », Beaux-Arts, n°110, mars, p. 44-48
- «Eugen Schönbeck», Beaux-Arts, n°114, p. 112

1994

- «Marcel Duchamp: révolution ou sabotage», Beaux Arts, n°110, p. 82-92
- «Les chimères de Barry Flanagan », Beaux-Arts, n°119, janvier, p. 44-48
- «Freud : la chair et au-delà», Beaux Arts, n°122, avril, p. 128
- «The Jack photographs of John Massey», Parachute, n°74, avril-mai-juin, p. 25-27
- "Immendorf entre dandysme et prophétisme", in catalogue Immendorf, abbaye Saint-André centre d’Art Contemporain, Meymac

1996

- Francis Bacon: la figure en filigrane, Paris, L’Echoppe, 20 pages
- « Les péchés capitaux. Essai frivole de transmutation des valeurs », in catalogue Les Péchés capitaux, Centre Pompidou, musée national d’Art Moderne, p. 13-39
- « Spirales », Cahiers du Musée national d’art moderne, n°58, p. 131-137.

1997

- « Kitaj La vie « en bleu » », Revue du Louvre, n°1, p. 79-82
- « Artistes en exil et intégration culturelle », Beaux-Arts, n°158, juillet, p. 30

1998

- « Polarités », in catalogue La collection du Centre Pompidou. Un parcours au musée d’Art Moderne de la Ville de Paris, Centre Georges Pompidou, Paris-Musées, p. 10-15
- "Narrativa i misteri", in exhibition catalogue Magritte, Fundació Joan Miró

1999

- "Isolateur et coupe-circuit (Georges Bataille et André Breton)", Les Temps Modernes, n°602, Jan.-Feb., p. 66-78
- "Masson, Bataille : In the Night of the Labyrinth", in catalogue André Masson in the 1930s, Salvador Dalí Museum, Saint-Petersburg, Florida, p. 55-63
- "Revoir le cubisme", in catalogue David Hockney, Dialogue avec Picasso, musée Picasso, Paris, Réunion des Musées Nationaux, p. 11-22
- « Cosmologies contemporaines », in catalogue Cosmos. Du romantisme à l’avant-garde, musée des Beaux-Arts, Montréal, p. 282-287
- « Eros perspectivisite », in catalogue David Hockney. Espace/Paysage, Centre Pompidou, Paris, p. 15-28

2000

- "Le Stropiat de René Magritte", Cahiers du Musée national d’art moderne, n°71, p. 94-104
- "Dresseur d’animaux (1923) de Francis Picabia", Cahiers du Musée national d’art moderne, n°72, p. 81-91
- "Marcel Duchamp. Neuf moules malics", Revue du Louvre, n°1, p. 56-61
- "Otto Dix. Erinnerung an die spiegelsäle von Brüssel", Revue du Louvre, n°1, p. 61-65
- "Les secrets de famille de Philippe Perrot", Art Press, n°254, Feb., p. 37-40
- "Il faut rendre grâce à la photographie contemporaine", Art Press, n°258, June, p. 69-70.
- "Un monde alangui", in catalogue Philippe Hortala, musée de l’Abbaye Sainte-Croix, Les Sables d’Olonne, p. 25-30
- "Les mystères de la Section d’or. Maurice Prinet au pays de la quatrième dimension", in catalogue La Section d’or, musées de Chateauroux, musée Fabre Montpellier, éd. Cercle d’Art, p. 63-68
- « Peindre contre le ravin », in catalogue Philip Guston peinture 1947-1979, Centre Pompidou, p. 11-17
- « Portrait, masque, cagoule », in catalogue Hélion, ou l’invention de l’Autre, Principauté de Monaco, salle du quai Antoine Ier, p. 15-22
- "Jean Michel Sanejouand ou l’éloge de l’irréductibilité", in catalogue Jean Michel Sanejouand, école supérieure des Beaux-Arts de Tours, p. 3-15

2001

- Duchamp sans fins, Edition L’Echoppe, Paris
- Marcel Duchamp dans les collections du Centre Georges Pompidou Musée national d’Art Moderne, Centre Pompidou,159 p.
- « Masson et Bataille dans la nuit espagnole », in catalogue Paris-Barcelone. De Gaudi à Miro, Galeries Nationales du Grand-Palais, p. 444-457
- « Comme un poisson (rouge ?) dans l’eau. Gilles Aillaud ou la dialectique de l’image », in catalogue Gilles Aillaud. La jungle des villes, Actes Sud, p. 7-18

2002

- Surréalisme et mythologie moderne, Paris, Gallimard, 159 pages
- « Comment New York vola l’idée surréaliste du mythe moderne (et retour) », in catalogue La révolution surréaliste, Centre Georges Pompidou, Paris, p. 412-419
- « Le somnanbulisme lucide de Max Beckmann », in catalogue Max Beckmann, Centre Georges Pompidou, Paris, p. 17-29
- Francis Picabia dans les collections du Musée National d’Art Moderne, Centre Pompidou, 150 pages.

2003

- « Le Grand Jeu et le surréalisme français », in catalogue Grand jeu et Surréalisme, Reims, Musée des Beaux arts.

2004

- « Nouvelle Objectivité : Le retour à l’ordre social de l’art », in catalogue La nouvelle objectivité, Musée des Beaux Arts de Grenoble.

2005

- « Alberto Savinio ou la Métaphysique joyeuse », in catalogue La peinture Métaphysique, Musée des Beaux Arts de Grenoble.

2009

- « Le Mur Breton », Dada Surrealism, Rome, Vittoriano, 10-9-2009 – 2-7-2010
- " Le Surrealisme aux portes de Moscou", Surrealism : Paris- Prague, Ludwigshafen, 10-14-2009 – 2-14-2010

2012

- Hopper : Ombre et lumière du mythe américain, collection « Découvertes Gallimard » (nº 585), série Arts. Paris: Éditions Gallimard and Réunion des Musées Nationaux, 128 pages, ISBN 9782070447350

2015

- Picasso.mania, coll. « Découvertes Gallimard Hors série », Paris: Éditions Gallimard and Réunion des Musées Nationaux, 48 pages, ISBN 9782070106899
