= Didier Beugnies =

Belgian footballer

Personal information
- Date of birth: 14 March 1961 (age 65)
- Place of birth: Frameries, Belgium
- Position: Forward

Senior career*
| Years | Team | Apps | (Gls) |
| 1983–1984 | Mons | | |
| 1984–1992 | Charleroi | 126 | (78) |
| 1992–1993 | Mons | | |
| 1993–1994 | Namur | | |

International career
| 1986 | Belgium Olympic | 3 | (1) |

Managerial career
- 2001–2012: Charleroi (youth)
- 2012: RWDM Brussels (youth)
- 2012–2013: RWDM Brussels
- 2013: RWDM Brussels
- 2013–2014: RWDM Brussels
- 2014–2015: Mons
- * Club domestic league appearances and goals

Didier Beugnies (born 14 March 1961) is a Belgian former professional football player and manager.

== Club career ==
Beugnies began his professional career at Mons during the 1983–84 Belgian First Division, before joining Charleroi the following season, where he played eight seasons. Reaching promotion with Charleroi from the second tier, he became the top goalscorer of the division with 23 goals in the 1984–85 seasons. During his second season with Les Zèbres, in the 1985–86 season, he scored 22 goals and finished second in the race for the golden boot, behind Erwin Vandenbergh and ahead of Jean-Pierre Papin.

He continued his career with a return for a season at Mons, before retiring from football as part of Namur in 1994 at the age of 33.

== International career ==
In 1986, Beugnies was called up for the Belgium squad for the qualification for the 1988 Summer Olympics, for which they eventually failed to qualify. He made three appearances in which he scored one goal.

== Managerial career ==
Beugnies returned to the world of football by coaching the youth teams of Charleroi from 2001 to 2009. He was the manager of RWDM Brussels during three short periods between 2012 and 2014, then the final coach of Mons as the club filed for bankruptcy in 2015.
