= Edward M. Walsh =

Irish academic, founding President of the University of Limerick

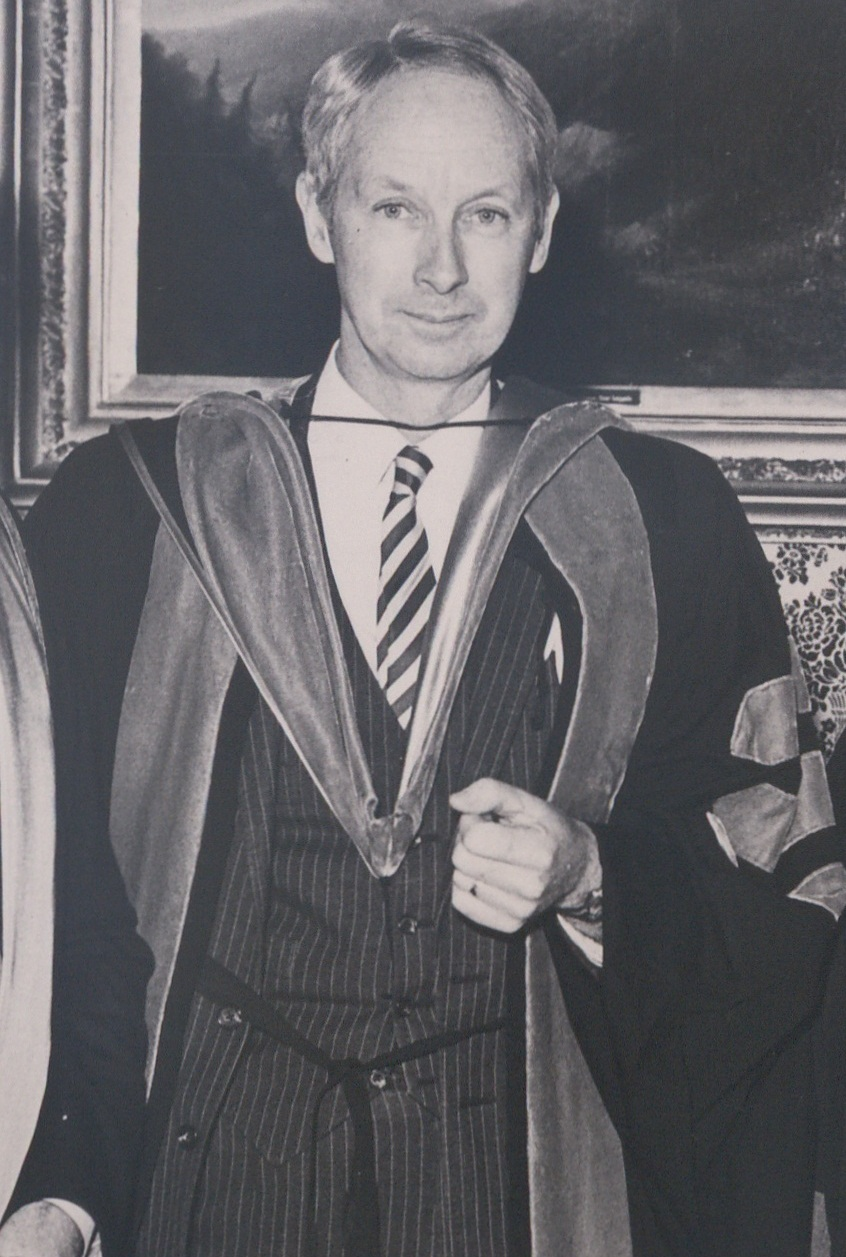
Walsh in 1989

Edward Mary Walsh (born 1939), is the founding president of the University of Limerick, one of two new universities established by Ireland in 1989. He headed the institution from its inception as the National Institute for Higher Education Limerick, in 1970, when he was appointed as chairman of the planning board, and director, through its transformation to a university in 1989, when he was appointed president, until his retirement in 1998, when he was awarded the title of "Founding President" for life.

A native of Cork city, Walsh is a chartered engineer and registered silversmith.

== Early life ==
Born 1939 in Cork, Ireland, to a butcher and cattle-dealer, he was educated at Christian Brothers College, Cork. He is the close relative and godson of Michael Grimes, first professor of microbiology at University College Cork (UCC).

== Academic career ==
=== Early career ===
Walsh graduated from UCC with a B.Eng. in 1961. He worked as an engineer with Pye, Cambridge in the UK in 1960.

He pursued advanced studies in nuclear and electrical engineering at Iowa State University (ISU), gaining a master's in 1963, and his doctorate in 1964. He was an associate of the US Atomic Energy Commission Laboratory in Ames, Iowa 1963–1965.

Walsh was appointed assistant professor at ISU at age 24, the youngest in the history of the university, and served from 1964 to 1965. He was then appointed founding director of the Energy Research Group Programme, chairman of the Engineering Faculty Research committee and associate professor at Virginia Polytechnic and State University, where he served from 1965 to 1969. He also consulted for US energy companies, including the American Electric Power Company (VA) and Furnace Fuels (CA).

=== NIHE Director and UL President ===
In 1970 Walsh was appointed by Ireland's Minister for Education, Pádraig Faulkner, as chairman of the planning body for a new kind of educational institution, he selected the new campus site and drove the preparation for, and launch of, the National Institute for Higher Education (NIHE), Limerick, and its establishment as the University of Limerick in 1989. He is credited with securing funding from the World Bank and the European Investment Bank, and with mounting an international fundraising campaign that secured the support of major philanthropists such as Chuck Feeney and Lewis Glucksman and permitted the University of Limerick to expand significantly at a time when government capital grants were being handed out scarcely. The university introduced to Ireland some academic and administrative systems used in leading US universities, such as continuous assessment, the weighted Grade Point Average and cooperative education. At the outset it introduced Ireland's first degree in European Studies and fostered international placement of students through European Union schemes such as the ERASMUS programme.

=== Local and national bodies ===
Walsh has served as founding chairman of several Irish national bodies: the Irish Council for Science Technology and Innovation, the National Technological Park, the National Council for Curriculum and Assessment, and The National Self–Portrait Collection of Ireland. He has served as chairman of the Craggaunowen Project, and of multinational initiatives such as the Japan-Europe Partnership, Irish-American Partnership and the Irish Peace Institute.

He has also served as chairperson of the Conference of Heads of Irish Universities, Birr Historic Science Foundation, Shannon Development, and of the advisory board of Barrington's Hospital, and as vice-president of the International Association of University Presidents. He has served on the boards or advisory boards of a range of organisations, including the University of Limerick Foundation, the University of Dublin, Dublin City University's Ryan Academy for Entrepreneurship, the Bons Secours group of hospitals, Science Foundation Ireland, Opera Theatre Company, and the Hunt Museum.

He is the principal of Oakhampton Consultants.

=== Memberships and recognition ===
Walsh was elected as a member of the Royal Irish Academy in the Science division, and is also a member of the Irish Academy of Engineering, established by the Institution of Engineers of Ireland, and of the Institution of Electrical Engineers. He was also a member of the Institute of Electrical and Electronics Engineers (IEEE) and the New York Academy of Sciences. He is an honorary member of the Royal Hibernian Academy and a Fellow of the Royal Society of the Arts. Walsh received honorary doctorates from five Irish universities, though he returned his National University of Ireland award in protest at the making of an honorary degree award to former Taoiseach Brian Cowen. (Note: The NUI accepted the return of Walsh's parchment, and offered to accept the robes by post, but noted that while he could potentially be omitted from published lists of awardees, there is no mechanism to "unaward" a degree.)

Walsh was also made a Freeman of the City of Limerick, and in 2012 was appointed as grand marshal for Limerick's St Patrick's Day Parade.

== Academic publications ==
=== Book ===
Walsh published an academic textbook in 1967:

- New York, USA: Ronald Press, Energy Conversion: electromechanical, direct, nuclear (textbook, with an instructor's manual also available)

=== Articles ===
He has authored and co-authored a wide range of articles, some well cited.

== Personal life ==
Walsh is married to Stephanie Walsh (née Barrett), and they have three sons and one daughter. His hobbies include yachting and gardening, and he plays piano, violin and the clarinet.

=== Memoir ===
Walsh's memoir, Upstart: friends, foes and founding a university, describes the controversial events associated with the establishment of the Republic of Ireland's first new university. Published by Collins Press in October 2011, it was written in collaboration with journalist Kieran Fagan.

== See also ==
- Danny O'Hare, founding president of NIHE, Dublin, which also became a university in September 1989.

Academic offices
Preceded by (President of NIHE Limerick)	President of the University of Limerick; 1970–1998	Succeeded by Roger GH Downer
