= Kerstin Mey =

Arts academic and university administrator

- Born: 1963 (age 62–63); East Berlin, East Germany
- Education: Humboldt University of Berlin
- Known for: Presidency of the University of Limerick

Kerstin Mey (born 1963) is a German academic and a lecturer at University of Limerick, who previously served at the university's president between 2020-2024. She was the first woman to head a university in Ireland, on an acting basis, and having participated in an international competition, was appointed to the full position with effect from 8 October 2021. She held positions in a number of universities in Germany and the United Kingdom before moving to Limerick in the west of Ireland.

== Early life and education ==
Kerstin Mey was born in East Berlin, Germany in 1963. She attended Humboldt University, where she studied Art and German (language and literature); she earned a PhD in Art Theory and Aesthetics from the same university and took up a lecturership and executive assistant role there in 1990.

== Academic and administrative career ==
=== UK & Northern Ireland ===
Mey moved to the UK in 1992 and worked as DAAD Lektor for German language at Warwick University in 1992. During her time at Warwick, she studied for a PG Dip in European Cultural Policy and Administration and was awarded a short-term fellowship at the Henry Moore Institute Leeds for a research project on contemporary sculpture.

In 1996, she was appointed as Lecturer in Fine Art at Duncan of Jordanstone College of Art and Design, University of Dundee and promoted to Senior Lecturer in 2002.

From 2004 to 2009, she led the research area ‘Art and its Location’ in Interface: Centre for Research in Art, Technologies and Design at the University of Ulster and served as the Centre’s Acting Director between 2008 and 2009. From 2005 to 2008, she also headed up the Research Institute in Art and Design for the University. She held a full professorship in Fine Art and was the artistic director of ISEA 2009: Engaged Creativity in Mobile Environments on the island of Ireland.

In 2009, she moved to the University for the Creative Arts in England heading up the organisations research and enterprise function as its Director. There she focused on building the university’s research infrastructure and culture, and advancing the practice-based PhD programme in partnership with University of Brighton.

In 2013, she became pro-vice-chancellor and executive dean of the Westminster School of Media, Arts and Design, the leading faculty within the University of Westminster, where she was also professor of Contemporary Art and Theory. As pro-vice chancellor she co-led an ambitious academic transformation programme with the embedding of the university-wide electives and graduate attributes in the undergraduate curricula across the institution.

=== Ireland ===
In April 2018, she became the vice-president for Academic Affairs and Student Engagement for University of Limerick (UL) as well as the institution's Professor of Visual Culture. She introduced and led an ambitious academic transformation programme and ensured the smooth transition to hybrid and online learning of the university during Covid19.

In July 2020, Mey was appointed interim president of University of Limerick, the first woman to head up an Irish university in the 428 years of history of the sector. The university ran a global search for the presidency over the following months, and Mey was announced as the winning candidate, and formally appointed to the role at the meeting of its governing authority on 8 October 2021.

During her presidency, Mey pursued an organisational transformation agenda and University of Limerick significantly improved its performance. It achieved Athena Swan Silver award as the first HEI in Ireland. Mey introduced innovative professional role profiles to the HE sector in Ireland and facilitated the bottom-up development and implementation of a pioneering, systemic and mission-based Sustainability Framework to 2030. UL moved into the 500 globally leading universities and grew its international recognition for impact and sustainability. In 2021, she oversaw the development and subsequent implementation of the pioneering, industry sponsored Immersive Software Engineering BSc/MSc.

To address mainly legacy issues, Mey attended Ireland's Public Accounts Committee in 2021, 2022 and as well as 2023 in what some commentators described as an "inept performance", with one question asked 23 times. In March 2024, the trade union in the university voted "no confidence" in the president, and 10 of the 13 members of UL's executive committee other than Mey, including the deputy president, wrote that "We wish to advise you that we do not consider it is in the best interests of the University of Limerick for you to continue as president", and "We do not have confidence that you will approach this in an appropriate manner". This was following a "significant over payment" (around 5.2 million euro) by UL for 20 houses for students, an overspend which, combined with provisions for a previous over payment for a site in central Limerick under her predecessor, created temporary budgetary pressures for the university. The development also turned out to lack planning permission for use as student accommodation.

Mey notified the Public Accounts Committee on 23 March 2024 that she would not be able to make a scheduled appearance on 11 April 2024 but that she will honour the invitation at a later point during that term. On 14 June 2024, UL chancellor Brigid Laffan announced Mey would resign from her role as president on 1 September 2024, continuing at the university as a full professor of Visual Culture.

=== Other roles ===
Mey has held a number of leadership and governance positions in international higher education. Amongst others, she was Director of CREST now GuildHE Research, the research consortium of the UK higher education interest group for small and specialised universities. She served on the Austrian Science Board, a 12 member strong advisory for the Federal Minister with responsibilities for higher education and research appointed by the Austrian Parliament from 2012–2018. Mey was an Executive member and Vice Chair of CHEAD Council for Higher Education in Art and Design, UK. Between 2019 and 2024 she served on the National Forum for the Enhancement of Teaching and Learning in Ireland, and she chaired the Council of the Irish Universities Association in 2023.

She also held board and advisory positions in cultural organisations. Between 2008-9 she steered the Ormeau Baths Galleries, the then premier venue for contemporary art in Belfast, Northern Ireland, through a complex transition phase as Chair and acting CEO. Amongst others, she was on the board of PAL, Performing Arts Labs, UK, and served on the ISEA International Advisory Committee.

She also served as a member of the board of directors of the Irish Chamber Orchestra and is a member of the board of Eva International Biennial and the Hunt Museum.

=== Research ===
Mey’s research is concerned with 20th century contemporary art, aesthetics and public pedagogies. It includes inquiries on the relationship between art and identity formation artistic research, and the relationship between art, documentation and archives. Her current focus is directed at the nexus between contemporary creative practices and the development of narrative frameworks in relation to value hierarchies, models of practice and social transformation processes towards sustainability and regeneration.
