= National Self-Portrait Collection of Ireland =

Collection at the University of Limerick

The National Self-Portrait Collection of Ireland is a collection of more than 400 self-portraits of Irish artists which is housed in the Kneafsey Gallery at the University of Limerick.

The origins of the collection can be found in the purchase of fifteen self-portraits from the collection of John Kneafsey by the university in 1977. Kneafsey had worked as office manager for the Irish Independent newspaper and was a former chair of the Limerick Art Society, a patron and collector of art.

In 1982, the university appointed a board of trustees tasked with establishing and maintaining a national collection which would reflect a broad spectrum of the visual arts across the island. In addition to creating a national reference collection, the process aims to formally recognise the contributions made by Irish artists in their own lifetime. The first board of trustees consisted of the director of the National Gallery of Ireland, the Keeper of Art at the Royal Hibernian Academy and the director of the Arts Council, overseen by the president of the unstitution. Each year, the board invite a small number of artists to add their portraits to the collection for a nominal fee. Additional works of deceased artists are also purchased. The trustees intended to publish a volume of works every decade to record the growth of the collection. The board of trustees has at various times included art-historians and critics from across the island. The fee paid to artists has risen over time and in 1997 stood at £250 to cover the cost of materials.

The Kneafsey Gallery was officially opened on 6 March 1982, with the inaugural exhibition comprising the fifteen initial purchases and a further thirteen self-portraits by artists admired, and approached by Thomas Ryan. Works in the debut exhibition were supplemented with works loaned from several local and national collections, including works from the Ulster Museum and Dublin's Municipal Gallery.

In subsequent years, additions to the collection have come from selected members of Ireland's leading art societies including the Royal Hibernian Academy, Royal Ulster Academy, and Aosdána. The collection has expanded to include works by painters, sculptors, printmakers, ceramicists, photographers and mixed media artists. Although comprising mainly twentieth and twenty-first century artists, the collection has also grown to include historical works from previous centuries. Each year the new artists are invited to a meal at the Jean Monnet Theatre where their works are projected onto the walls as the artists are formally introduced to the assembled audience.

Selected works from the collection have toured Ireland at various times including in 1989 when a large selection was displayed at the National Gallery of Ireland in Dublin and then travelled to the Arts Council of Northern Ireland Gallery in Belfast and the Crawford Art Gallery in Cork. Dr Edward Walsh presented the same selection of works from the collection in a visiting exhibition at the Boston University Art Gallery in 1992. In 2003, a selection of works was presented at Draíocht in Blanchardstown.

The collection is split across several buildings including the Foundation Building and Plassey House. In 2012, the collection had grown to 465 works from 438 artists.
