= University of Limerick Student Life =

Representative and social body in Limerick, Ireland

- Motto: Belong to the Pack
- Institution: University of Limerick
- Location: New Student Centre
- Established: 1972
- Affiliations: none
- Website: ulstudentlife.ie

University of Limerick Student Life (Irish: Saol na Mac Léinn, Ollscoil Luimnigh), formerly known as University of Limerick Students' Union (Irish: Aontas Na Mac Léinn, Ollscoil Luimnigh), is the representative body for students at the University of Limerick (UL) in Ireland. The union also organises social activities, and supports a range of clubs and societies.

== History ==
=== Formation ===
The National Institute for Higher Education (NIHE) was founded in Limerick in 1972. Although planners had hoped students across the new institutions at Plassey would form a single representative body, students instead established separate unions for the NIHE and Thomond College of Education. The NIHE Students' Union elected John Redington as its first president in 1972, while Thomond College students elected Brendan Lillis as president of their own union.

The union's first officers faced the challenge of establishing representative structures for a newly founded institution and received assistance from the Union of Students in Ireland, whose president at the time, Pat Rabbitte, visited NIHE Limerick to support the development of the organisation. In its early years all officers served in a voluntary capacity. The first full-time sabbatical president was introduced in 1975, allowing the holder to take leave from studies to work full-time on student representation.

=== Union of Students in Ireland ===
The unions affiliated with the Union of Students in Ireland shortly after their foundation in 1972. While the relationship provided organisational support during the union's formative years, it was not always harmonious. Many students regarded USI politics as excessively ideological and increasingly disconnected from issues affecting students in Limerick.

In 1991 ULSU disaffiliated from USI, arguing that the national organisation no longer effectively represented the interests of ordinary students. ULSU has not subsequently reaffiliated with USI. An inquorate referendum held in 2001 indicated some support for rejoining the national union, with just under 55 per cent of votes cast in favour. However, the proposal failed to reach the required threshold for approval, with only 700 votes cast against a requirement of 20 per cent of the student body (later reduced to 15 per cent in 2006).

=== Over the years ===
In May 1980, then NIHESU issued a statement condemning the NIHE Bill 1980, alongside a joint statement from the Federation of University Teachers and the then-USI. The joint statement said that the bill would place the institute, which the bill would grant a statutory footing to, "under the thumb of the Department of Education" in a way that would be "unacceptable for any secondary school". The statement from NIHESU said the Bill would deal a vicious blow to the future of the college and that it had been drafted with little thought.

In September 2001, ULSU rescheduled its graduation ball from Friday the 14th to Saturday the 15th in order to mark a national day of mourning in response to the September 11 terrorist attacks called by the Government of Ireland.

In April 2004, the Council of ULSU decided not to ban the Irish Blood Transfusion Service form the Student Centre over their decision to ban gay men from donating blood, allowing them to use the student centre for blood donations. ULSU claimed Australia allowed gay men who had not had sex in over 12 months to donate blood while IBTS claimed no blood transfusion service "in the developed world" allowed gay men to donate blood.

During the 2014 SU elections, SU President candidate Tommy Bolger produced a campaign video which saw over 25,000 views in a matter of hours. The youtube video portrays the candidate as the Wolf of UL Student Union, a play on words based on the Wolf of Wall Street and the UL Wolves brand which is the umbrella brand for UL Clubs and Societies. The video complains about the cost of living, among other issues. Mr Bolger would go on to win the election and serve a term as president for the following academic year.

=== Re-branding ===
In July 2018, the union underwent a re-brand to "University of Limerick Student Life". This re-brand was spearheaded by the 2017/2018 executive with a view to increasing student participation.

Logo previous to the 2018 rebrand

However this re-brand faced criticism from both past and present students and raised questions about the democratic process within the union. Under the union's constitution, name changes must be approved by a college-wide referendum or an AGM, where the quorum is 100 students. 25 members were in attendance when the name change was proposed with only 3 voting against the proposed re-brand. The re-brand also attracted controversy due to the high costs involved. A former vice-president of the Postgraduate Students' Union cited costs of between €20,000 and €25,000 for development of the brand by an outside company, alone. As of 2018, additional costs associated with the re-brand were not known.

In January 2026, the Limerick Voice reported that some of the organisation's documents (including minutes, policy documents and audited accounts dating from 1991 to 2021) were no longer available following the migration of a SharePoint site.

== Student centres ==
The university's first dedicated student centre was established in the former stables complex at Plassey House. Student representatives had campaigned to preserve the historic buildings from demolition, and the complex was subsequently used for student activities and union operations.

In the late 1990s, student services and union facilities moved to a purpose-built student centre in the Stables Courtyard complex. The building served as the primary hub of student activity for over two decades.

In September 2025, the union moved to a new 34 million euro student centre on the University of Limerick campus. This building was designed to accommodate an increased student population and replaced the 1999 student centre in the Stables Courtyard. The new centre won the 'building' category at the Irish Concrete Society's 43rd Annual Awards. The new centre includes games and recreation spaces, dedicated multimedia facilities for student media organisations such as student radio, a purpose-built theatre and performance venue, meeting and collaboration rooms, welfare and support services, and facilities for clubs and societies. In June 2026, the student centre was one of four winners of the 'Public Buildings' category award at the Royal Institute of Architects in Ireland annual awards alongside East Meath Civic Centre, RCSI's Project Connect, and Barretstown Medical Centre. The building was the winner of the 'Building of the Year – Educational (Over 10M)' prize from the Building and Architect of the Year Awards 2026

== Finances ==
Between 1999 and 2008, UL Student Life received two bailouts from the University as it neared bankruptcy due to poor financial management. Two thirds of capitation funding received directly from the university was provided to Clubs and Societies by the then-students union, as did the then-postgraduates students association (now PSU).

In 2025, the union received a €700,000 bailout from the university of limerick, in the form of a €400,000 grant and a €300,000 loan, to be repaid over seven years. The same year, the university commissioned an internal audit of UL Student Life following a request to extend the student levy used to fund the Student Centre in order to cover cost overruns estimated at just under €500,000. UL Student Life claimed the increase in the student levy would not increase the amount of student levy paid by students. The audit identified operating deficits and recommended improvements to financial, operational, and governance controls, after which the university appointed an oversight manager to support their implementation. The report found that the university's oversight of the union should be improved, and so should training of students union representatives on the university's governing authority.

It was revealed that the union had spent 1.59 million euro more than it had budgeted between 2023 and 2025, and that the union had not reported on its finances the university during that period. The board had been provided with an estimate for the 2022/2023 year of €33k in October 2023 but the accounts, published in February 2025 showed a near €620k loss. No other financial updates were provided to the union's board or staff between the October 2023 update and august 2025. All annual budgets provided to the board during that period projected a surplus, but all made a loss. All of the unions financial reserves were depleted during that period, including reserved belonging to the clubs and societies.

In September 2026, the union sought to hire a financial controller to ensure that "effective decision making by the general manager, senior management team and board through the provision of accurate financial information, analysis, forecasting and advice” was restored. The role is the to remunerated up to 75'000 euro per annum. The function had been outsourced for a number of years following the dismissal of the then-financial controller in 2021. This was one of 33 reccomendations made to the union as part of the governance review.The successful applicant is to be appointed as company secretary to the union. As of September 2026, the union had an annual turnover of around 2 million and circa 16 full time staff.

In October 2025, staff wrote to the Board of Directors and expressed "grave concern" about the finances and governance of ULSL. In the letter, they further claimed the Board had "failed in their duties". The letter was promted due to concered raised by a trade union executive about the solvency of the organisation and its ability to pay the employees wages and retain them. Having received no response, they wrote again in December 2025. In this letter, they outlined their wish to "disassociate" themselves from the governance failures at the organisation and urged that "those responsible are held accountable". Neither letter received a formal acknowledgement or reply from the board. However a now-former director contacted the staff and told them to "desist from sending these wholly inappropriate communications", adding they should "work with the general manager", stating that "As a matter of good governance [...] boards do not report to staff." It is unclear whether this response was done with the knowledge or consent of the rest of the directors.

The Union is expected to turn a profit for the year ended on the 30th of September 2026, for the first time in at least three years.

It was revealed that a company credit card, attributed to then-general manager Martin Ryan was used to make twenty-five thousand euro worth of purchases, including €12,274 spent on travel and accommodation of staff attending US conferences, between September 2024 and August 2025. Tough policy in place required no approvals for such purchases, only 'limited assurance' was found which could indicate that the purchases were made for the purposes of the Union.

== Publications ==
Among the earliest student publications at the University of Limerick, and its predecessor institutions, were Ereb and Ekilips, which appeared during the 1974–75 academic year. These featured opinion pieces, humour, satire, cartoons, poetry and puzzles. In the late 1980s, student media expanded with publications such as Link-Up and Mercury, both of which were relatively short-lived and focused primarily on media, entertainment and student culture.

By the 1990s, An Focal had become the organisation's principal student newspaper. The production of An Focal was formerly the responsibility of the vice-president/communications officer. Following the abolition of this office in 2012, a full-time student editor was appointed. The editor is assisted by an editorial team of student volunteers as well as student contributors. Since December 2017, it has been a monthly publication. In February 2026, the University's Media Society was established, with one of their stated aims being to re-establish the defunct newspaper. However, as of June 2026, the paper is still not operational.

In February 2026, the organisation published a report titled the "Commuter Survey Report" which focused on the experiences of commuter students. The report, which referred to UL Student Life as "UL Students' Union", found that 97% of commuter students were negatively impacted by commuting and 50% said it made social engagement very difficult. The report called on the Higher Education Authority to remove its capital funding block on the university.

== Governance ==
=== Organisation ===
The organisation has had the legal form of a company limited by guarantee established under part 18 of the Companies Act 2014 since 2022, being a body with a board of trustees prior to that. The company or Clg structure is unusual for an Irish Students' Union. As the union is a company, it is separate from the university. The decision to convert to a CLG and to adopt the CLG constitution was made at an inquorate AGM.

The organisation receives funding from the university, with students paying a levy approved by referendum as part of the "Leave a Legacy" campaign, which contributes to projects including the redevelopment of Maguire pitches, the handball alley, the extension of the UL Arena climbing wall and the construction of the new student centre.

The organisation has a president, known as the "Student President", who supports its general manager and acts on matters of policy. The president reports to the general manager as part of the senior management team.

In September 2026, it was reported that the union had proceeded with incorporation as a company limited by guarantee despite a recommendation in an earlier quality review that it should remain an unincorporated association. Incorporation as a CLG introduced additional financial reporting requirements. According to the Irish Examiner, no accounts were presented to the union's Board between 2023 and August 2025. Following incorporation, the union also ceased presenting full financial statements to students at its student forum, which had replaced the previous annual general meeting. On one occasion, financial line items were presented with the corresponding figures redacted. A further quality review of ULSL, conducted in 2025, concluded that "trust and transparency needed to improve" and stated that shortcomings in financial planning should be addressed as "a matter of urgency". The Union is required to review its Constitution and By-Laws every five years.

=== Council and executive committee ===
The executive meets weekly to discuss policy, feedback, and ongoing work, and provide input to the union's senior management and general manager as to the interests of students, while the student council meets every three weeks. The 4 sabbatical officers sit on a number of university committees, where they represent students.

The University of Limerick's student body, including postgraduate students, who are also represented by a separate union, elect a six-person full-time and part-time officer team.

The Clubs and Societies Council elects a Clubs officer and Societies officer who sit on both the executive and council. The postgraduate students union's president (or a nominee) sits on exec and council.

The four sabbatical officers (President, VPA, DP/Welfare and VPD&I, formerly VP Communities) alongside two part-time executive roles, the Faculties Officer and Student Council Chair are directly elected by the student body.

The remaining four members of the executive are chosen via a so called "First passed [sic] the post" nomination system, whereby the first person to hand in a form containing twenty signatures to the SU front desk is deemed elected the position. This is not to be confused with an actual FPTP election, which would involve a vote of the students.

Council is nominated in the same manner, where the first person to hand in a form containing twenty signatures is deemed elected, on a "first passed [sic] the post basis". The role of council is to set union policy, subject to approval from the board of directors. Council must identify issues of concern to students and raise them with the senior management team to ensure they are resolved. The senior management team must either approve or reject the implementation of council motions. The Council elects Faculty representatives, its deputy chair and an executive oversight committee by and from its own membership.

On the 4th of February 2025, Council chose to amend the Byelaws and Constitution to change the position of Communities Officer to that of Diversity and Inclusion Officer, a change which included modifications in role specifications to reflect the new position, but which also served to reflect the organic change that had happened to the former role over time which had moved closer to an EDI role. The vote was 10 TÁ, 2 NÍL and no STAON.

The bye laws stats that representatives "will not be ... authorised to fulfil" their campaign promises or manifestos and that "the mandate held by the office is the only mandate [of] the elected representative" as elected representatives are "elected to their role to represent a cohort of students" and are not "expected" to fullfill their manifesto or campaign promises.

The job description and requirements of the role of the sabbatical officers is to be set each year by the union's 'HR Consultant' and are therefore not contained in the Constitution or Bye Laws. They can be found on the union's website. They include "essential qualifications and experience" requirements such as strong IT skills, or the ability to work "in a busy and fast paced environment" or "as part of a team and on own initiative."

=== Board of directors ===
The board of directors of UL Student Life is responsible for the governance of the organisation, including oversight of staff, financial management, legal and regulatory compliance, and accountability. It comprises ten members: the four student officers, the chair of student council, the faculties officer, and up to four external non-student directors. The Provost and Deputy President of the university sit in on board meetings when financial matters are dealt with.

Under Article 11.5 of the articles of association, the board may override decisions or policies made by student referendums or the Student Council where it considers, in its absolute discretion, that such decisions have or may have financial implications for the organisation, may be inconsistent with legal requirements, may not be in the best interests of the organisation. The Chair of the Board resigned between february and march 2026.

Even though up to 40% of its membership is composed of unelected externals, it is the most democratic body of the union, excluding Clubs and Societies bodies, as up to 60% of its membership was determined by a vote of the students, compared to 46% of the Executive and 3.2% of Council, as sabbatical officers do not have a Council vote.

All but one fo the external directors in post in December 2025 had left the board by November 2026.

=== 2026 Governance Review ===
The university's internal audit unit undertook a review of the governance and finances of the union, which was completed in March 2026 and contained 33 recommendations to improve the union's governance structures, alongside three recommendations to the university. The review was described by the university's provost and deputy president as having found a "wide range of governance and financial weaknesses over recent years". The board was noted as having a "commitment to reform and to strengthening governance and financial management" of the union. A corporate oversight manager was appointed for a 6 to 9 month period to oversee the organisation and its implementation of the recommendations. It was noted that the organisation's "operational practice" did not "reflect" the provisions of the constitution and bye-laws in relation to financial reporting. A member of the university's governing authority queried whether there was public access to the financial statements. SL's "approach" to commercial activities as well as its "financial indepenence" was noted as needing "further consideration". Financial reporting was found to be “disjointed and siloed”, and not "open and transparent". Some staff were found not to have contracts in place.

The audit was trigerred after a major cost overrun on the new student centre raised questions about the union's ability to pay for these costs out of its reserves which turned out to have been depleted.

== Related organisations and services ==
=== Clubs and societies ===
University of Limerick Student Life supports the running of a range of clubs and societies (C&S) through the UL Wolves brand and administrative superstructure, with a separate council and executive committee, and two elected reps delegated to the union executive. These bodies are administered through the union by and for the students. As of 2026, ULSL supported 34 clubs and 37 societies.

At a C&S council meeting in September 2025, the head of student engagement, who oversees the C&S function, stated that a strategic fund linked to clubs and societies had been used across UL Student Life amid wider financial pressures. The fund consisted of unspent capitation funding allocated to C&S by the university during the Covid-19 pandemic. The matter was identified when the clubs and societies office sought to open the fund for applications for significant once-off expenditure and was unable to determine its balance. The minutes state that the fund had not been formally ring-fenced for clubs and societies and had instead been accounted for as part of the organisation's wider strategic reserve. The Students' Union committed to repaying the fund and estimated that approximately €800,000 of the fund had been used for activities outside of clubs and societies.

=== Postgraduate Students Union ===
There is also a separate Postgraduate Students Union (PSU), which represents postgraduate students on issues relating specifically to postgraduate study and student life.
