= Ledwith =

Ledwith is a surname. Notable people with the surname include:

- Ann Ledwith, Irish engineer and academic administrator
- Anthony Ledwith (1933–2015), British chemist
- Martin Ledwith, British actor and acting coach
- Micheál Ledwith, Irish Roman Catholic priest
- Mike Ledwith (1874–1929), American baseball player
- Thomas A. Ledwith (1840–1898), American lawyer and politician
