= An Focal =

University of Limerick student newspaper

- Type: Monthly(academic year)
- Format: Compact
- School: University of Limerick
- Editor: (2021/2022) Cian Dalton
- Founded: September 1992
- Headquarters: University of Limerick Students Union; Castletroy; Limerick; Ireland
- Website: anfocal.ie

An Focal is the University of Limerick's only student newspaper, run by the University of Limerick Students' Union. The newspaper was first published in 1992. The production of the paper was formerly the responsibility of the vice-president/communications officer within University of Limerick Students' Union. However, the role of VP/CO was abolished at a 2012 EGM, in week 2 of Semester 1, alongside the VP/Campaigns & Services Officer.As a result, a student editor was appointed. By 2024, the SU was seeking a student to serves as part time editor-in-chief.

The editor is assisted by an editorial team of student volunteers as well as student contributors. The paper's print schedule was, up until December 2017, fortnightly before the union decided to change it to monthly with the union citing that the paper had "deteriorated considerably in terms of layout, spelling, grammar, use of colour and overall design". The latest article on the website is from July 2024 and was the 6th article of 2024, a decline from 23 in 2023 (End-July: 22) and 44 in 2022 (End-July: 40). It the newspaper would typically not publish in July and August, and sometimes in June, so it would seem that it simply never restarted in September 2024.

The role of Editor-in-Chief appears to have become vacant in summer 2022 and never filled. In May 2024 and 2025, UL Student Life appears to have attempted to hire an editor for the newspaper, who would be paid and work for 7 hours per week, alongside dedicated media hub staff, but this seems not to have materialised. UL Media Society created the position of Editor in Chief for both AF and ULFM, but appears to have never taken control of both entities, save for a RAG week ULFM broadcast.

In February 2026, the University's Media Society was established, with one of their stated aims being to re-establish the defunct newspaper. However, as of September 2026, the paper is still not running again. The Student Centre Media Hub is still inoperative as of September 2026, a full year after the 34 million Euro Student Centre opened.

== Related bodies ==
In September 2008, UL Students Union proposed a "Union plan" which was to be the SU's collective manifesto containing "Union goals" for the 2008/2009 Academic Year, in addition to the individual manifestos of the sabbatical officers. One of the aims was to bring UL FM back on FM radio for the "whole academic year" as opposed to the then-system of "just during RAG week". In 2026, for RAG week, ULFM, which was being run by under the umbrella organisation, UL Media Society which also now controls An Focal, made a special as it had not run for a few years.

== Awards ==
Oxygen.ie Student Media Awards

- People's Choice Award 2011 - Under editor Finn McDuffie.
- People's Choice Award 2017 - Under editor Paul Saunders.
- Website of the year 2019 - Under editor Christine Costello.

TV3 National Media Awards

- Student Newspaper of the Year - Under Editor Finn McDuffie.
