= Brigid Laffan =

Irish political scientist

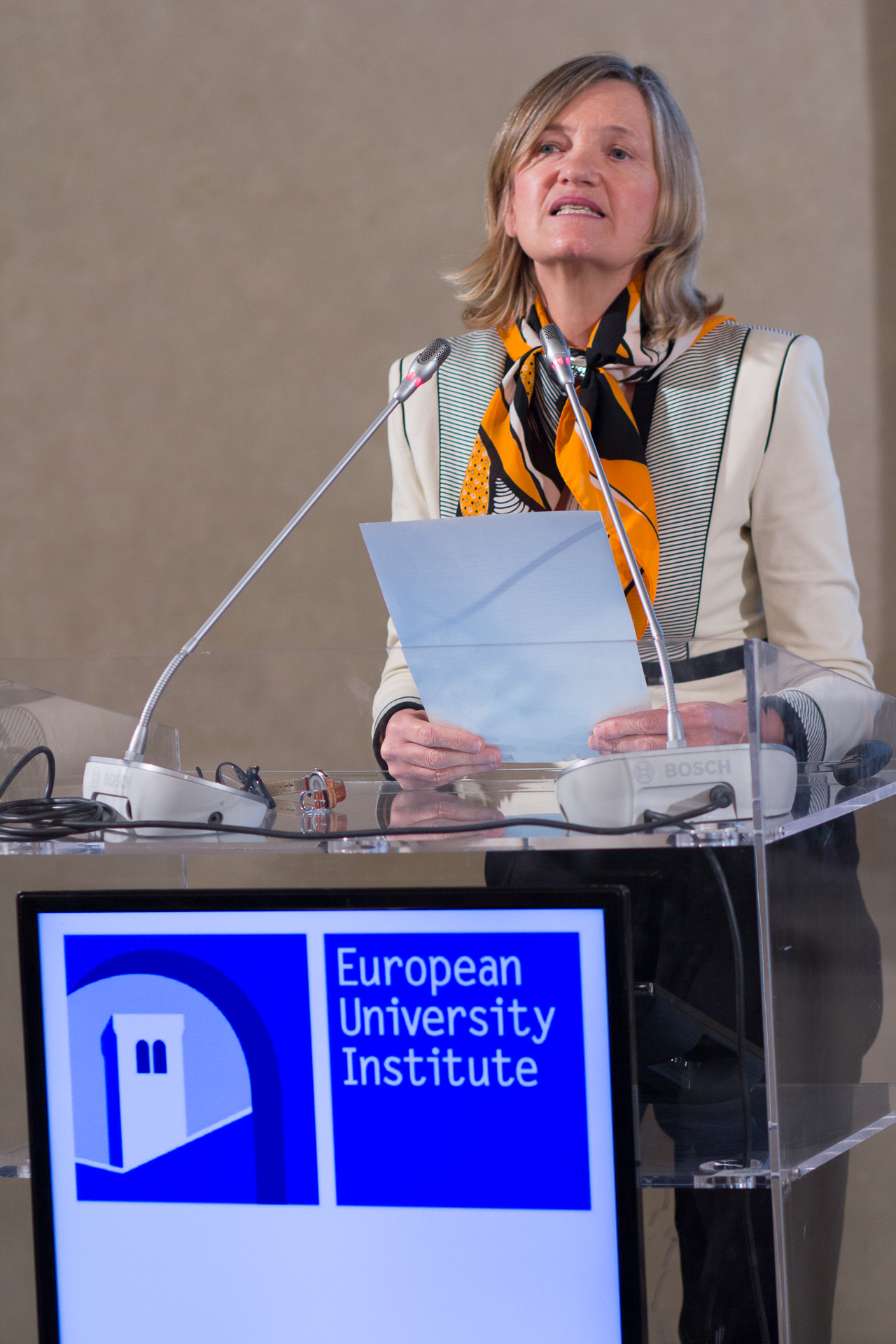
- Brigid Laffan in 2015
- Born: Brigid Burns
- Occupations: Political scientist, professor

Brigid Laffan is an Irish political scientist and Emeritus professor at Robert Schuman Centre for Advanced Studies at the European University Institute. Politico Europe ranked her among women who shape Europe in November 2018. She has been Chancellor of the University of Limerick since November 2023.

== Education ==
Born Brigid Burns, Laffan graduated in 1977 among the 113 founding students of the National Institute for Higher Education (NIHE). After graduating, Laffan became a research co-ordinator at the College of Europe in Bruges.

=== Career ===
In 2013, Laffan joined the European University Institute in Florence, where she was appointed as Director of the Robert Schuman Centre for Advanced Studies. She retired from the role in August 2021. Laffan was previously Professor of European Politics in University College Dublin. She has been outspoken about structural discrimination of women in academia.

Laffan has written extensively about Britain’s departure from the European Union, and has become "a renowned expert on all things Brexit".

On 2 November 2023, the University of Limerick approved Laffan as Chancellor, and chair of its governing body.

=== Selected awards ===
Laffan has received numerous awards for her professional achievements, including:

- UACES Lifetime Achievement Award in 2014
- THESEUS Award for outstanding research on European Integration in 2012
- Ordre national du Mérite by the President of France in 2010
- Honorary doctorate, University of Edinburgh
- Honorary doctorate, National University of Ireland
- Honorary doctorate, University of Limerick

=== Personal life ===
Laffan was married to the businessman Michael Laffan, whom she met as a student. They had three children. Her husband died in a swimming accident in January 2022.

== Other activities ==
- European Policy Centre (EPC), Member of the Governing Council (since 2021)
- Hertie School, Member of the Board of Trustees
- Royal Irish Academy, Member
