= Work-integrated learning =

Educational approach that combines study and work experience

Work-integrated learning (WIL) provides students with the opportunity to apply their learning from academic studies to relevant experiences and reciprocate learning back to their studies. WIL is an umbrella term; opportunities exist in various formats both on-campus and off-campus. Although WIL shares some of the same offerings as work-based learning (WBL), it is distinct in that WIL is part of school curriculum and often guided by learning objectives, while WBL is primarily grounded in the workplace and not necessarily connected to academic studies. WIL opportunities include but are not limited to: apprenticeships, field experience, mandatory professional practice, co-operative education, internships, applied research projects, and service learning. In Canada, WIL is defined by 9 types of experiential learning: (1) Co-op Work Term, (2) Internship, (3) Clinical Placement, (4) Field Placement, (5) Apprenticeship, (6) Applied Research, (7) Entrepreneurship, (8) Service Learning, and (9) Work Experience.

WIL is found to offer career, academic, and personal benefits in addition to benefits for employers and the academic institutions they are part of. Evidence links WIL to high levels of self-efficacy and strong professional networks and is a strong determinant of graduate employability. Students who participate in WIL are employment ready and may fare better in their job search and the transition from school to full-time employment. The benefits of WIL have made this programming popular in the post-secondary environment, with research from around the world, including Australia, Canada.

Numerous stakeholders are involved in WIL, including members of industry, students, administration, faculty, and in some instances, government. Due to the broad range of both categories and stakeholders, challenges exist in addition to the benefits of WIL. Power, equity, cost, and measurability have been flagged as areas of concern across WIL practices. Despite these concerns, WIL continues to experience growth and international attention.
