= Ann Ledwith =

Irish engineer and academic administrator

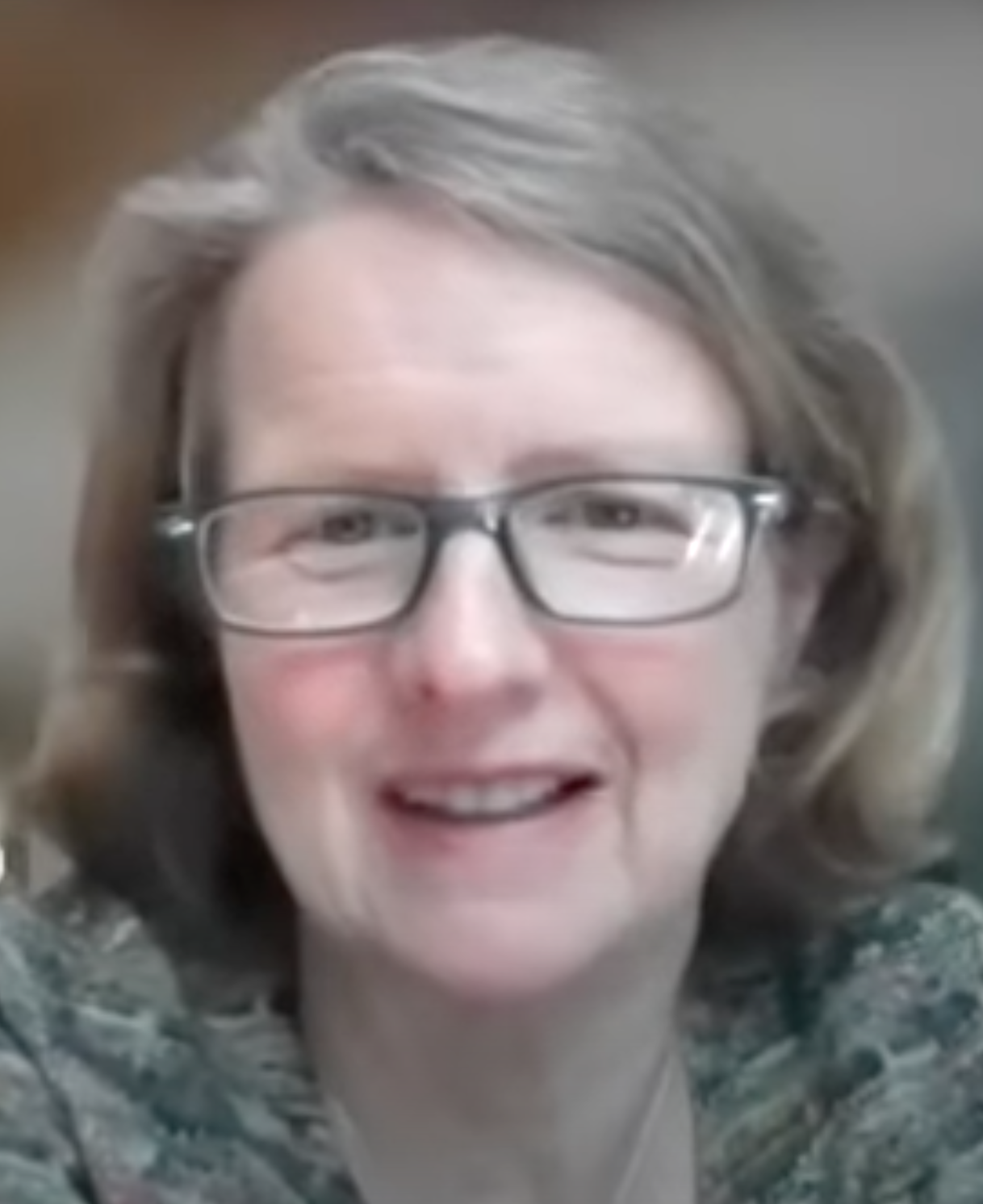
- Ledwith in 2021

Interim Provost and Deputy President of University of Limerick
- Incumbent
- Assumed office November 2024

Personal details
- Born: Limerick, Ireland
- Education: National Institute for Higher Education, Limerick; University of Brighton

Ann Ledwith is an Irish engineer and academic administrator currently as interim provost and deputy president of the University of Limerick since 2024. She has held various roles in academia and industry, focusing on engineering, technology management, and the development of work-based learning programs.

== Early life and education ==
Ledwith was born in Limerick, Ireland. She earned a degree in electronic engineering from the National Institute for Higher Education, Limerick in 1983. She later completed an M.B.A. at the Kemmy Business School and a Ph.D. in technology management at the University of Brighton in 2004.

== Career ==
Ledwith was a product development engineer and later worked as a product development manager in high-technology firms. She spent over twelve years in industry, focusing on product design, project management, and research and development in small firms.

In 1992, she joined the University of Limerick (UL) and held several academic and administrative roles. She managed the centre for project management, focusing on the development of programs tailored to industry needs. As assistant dean of research (adult and continuing education) in the faculty of science and engineering, she supported research initiatives and promoted flexible learning opportunities for adult learners.

Ledwith served as director of continuing and professional education, where she contributed to the creation of part-time and blended learning programs at undergraduate and postgraduate levels. These programs covered areas such as project management, innovation management, technology management, and reliability.

As dean of graduate and professional studies, she oversaw postgraduate education and facilitated work-based learning programs at the university. Her research during this time concentrated on new product development, project management, and innovation and technology management in small firms. She published her findings in academic journals including the Journal of Product Innovation Management and the International Journal of Project Management.

In her role as director of UL@Work, she led the Human Capital Initiative (HCI) project, which focused on developing industry-relevant education through flexible, technology-supported learning methods. She also managed the introduction of Brightspace, the university's virtual learning platform.

In November 2024, she was appointed interim provost and deputy president of the University of Limerick following an internal recruitment process.
