= Work-based learning =

Educational strategy

Work-based learning (WBL) refers to forms of learning that occur through participation in work and contribution, across formal, non-formal and informal contexts. In education policy, WBL is linked to national systems for the recognition and validation of learning outside formal programmes; in higher education and professional practice, it is also discussed as an emergent transdisciplinary mode of study.

Most WBL programs are generally university accredited courses, aiming at a win-win situation where the learner's needs and the industry requirement for skilled and talented employees both are met. WBL programs are targeted to bridge the gap between the learning and the doing. "Work-based learning strategies provide career awareness, career exploration opportunities, career planning activities and help students attain competencies such as positive work attitudes and other employable skills.

Work-based learning encompasses a diversity of formal, nonformal and informal arrangements including apprenticeships, work placement and informal learning on the job. The key driver is the need for active policies to secure learning that meets the need of the workplace.

== Background ==
=== Definition ===
Work-based learning (WBL) is defined differently across contexts:

- System / policy strand: International bodies such as the OECD, UNESCO, and Cedefop define WBL within wider systems for the recognition and validation of learning outside formal programmes, often connected to recognition of prior learning (RPL) or validation of non-formal and informal learning (VNFIL).
- Pedagogical strand: In higher education literature, WBL is often described as a pedagogical approach or mode of delivery that integrates academic study with workplace practice.
- Field strand: More recently, scholars have argued that WBL constitutes an emergent transdisciplinary field of study, focused on how contribution produces knowledge and how learning is socially recognized. Some recent scholarship further develops an epistemological and ontological foundation for WBL as a field.

=== Terminology and distinctions ===
Terminology around WBL varies internationally. Some authors distinguish between work-based learning, work-integrated learning, workplace learning, and co-operative education. While all involve connections between learning and contribution, policy documents and scholarly reviews note that the terms are not interchangeable and reflect different traditions. Work-integrated learning, for example, is commonly associated with structured higher education placements, whereas work-based learning is more broadly applied to learning that arises through participation in work roles and responsibilities.

=== Classification ===
Work-based learning is classified in three ways based on the:

- Duration of assignment: The work-based learning experience maybe of a duration of a few hours to 2/4 years
- Relation to course work: Work-based learning is generally related to a specific subject taught at school or university
- Stipend: WBL assignments may be paid or unpaid

== Policy and Recognition ==
International policy frameworks position WBL as central to lifelong learning. Reports from the OECD, UNESCO, and Cedefop emphasize the role of recognition of prior learning (RPL) and validation of non-formal and informal learning (VNFIL/RVA) in enabling individuals to gain credit for competencies developed outside formal education. These frameworks highlight common assessment methods (such as evidence portfolios, third-party testimony, and structured reflection) and emphasize their importance for social mobility, workforce development, and inclusion.

== WBL as a Field of Study ==
Beyond its policy applications, WBL has been described in scholarly literature as an emergent field of study. Authors have explored WBL as a transdisciplinary mode of inquiry, rooted in practice, reflection, and situated knowledge. This literature positions WBL as more than a pedagogical approach, instead framing it as a body of theory and research concerned with how contribution produces knowledge and how learning is socially recognized.

== Learning practices ==
=== Assessment ===
Assessment in WBL contexts often differs from traditional examinations. Policy frameworks describe methods such as portfolios of evidence, reflective narratives, employer or client attestations, and structured observation. These are typically evaluated against occupational or professional standards, and form part of recognition of prior learning (RPL) or validation of non-formal and informal learning (VNFIL).

=== Learning strategies ===
Work-based learning strategies include the following:

- Apprenticeship or internship or mentorship: An apprenticeship involves the student working for an employer where he or she is taught and supervised by an experienced employee of the chosen organization. The student is periodically evaluated for progress as per the skills and knowledge acquired, and maybe granted wages accordingly. At the end of the course, the student receives a certificate of service. The student learns in a realistic environment and gets the opportunity to apply his or her knowledge in real-world scenarios.
- Job shadowing: Job Shadowing is a short term opportunity that introduces the student to a particular job or career by pairing the student with an employee of the workplace. By following or 'shadowing' the employee, the student gets familiar with the duties and responsibilities associates with that job.
- Business/industry field trip: Field trips offer the students an insight in the latest technical advancements and business strategies of an enterprise. Students also gain awareness of the various career opportunities available and understand the driving forces of the community's economy.
- Entrepreneurial experience: This includes setting up of specific business, right from the planning, organizing and managing stage to the risk control and management aspects of a business.
- Cooperative education: In cooperative education, the work experience is planned in conjunction with the technical classroom instruction. This method is used by universities that do not have access to state-of-art equipment required to transact the technical course practically.
- School-based enterprise: A school-based enterprise is a simulated or actual business run by the school. It offers students a learning experience by letting them manage the various aspects of a business
- Service learning:This strategy combines community service with career, where students provide volunteer service to public and non-profit agencies, civic and government offices etc.

== Evaluation ==
=== Advantages ===
- Application of classroom learning in real-world setting
- Establishment of connection between school and work
- Improvement in critical thinking, analytical reasoning and logical abilities
- Expansion of curriculum and learning facilities
- Meeting the diverse needs of the learner
- Creating a talented and skilled pool of future employees
- Reduces pre-service training time and cost
- Improvement of student awareness of career opportunities
- Making education relevant and valuable to the social context
- Community building exercise for productive economy

=== Disadvantages ===
- Time-consuming activity to identify key courses that can be taught via WBL programs
- Needs careful consideration and planning when introducing WBL strategies within the existing curriculum
- Certain WBL programs may not be in sync with the formal education timelines and pattern
- It is unclear what key elements of this learning may be and that readily available indicators which equate with academic learning outcomes are not necessarily evoking it accuracy.
- Needs effective coordination between all key persons involved in the WBL program
- Effective evaluation strategy needs to be developed for assessing student performance. This should encompass both formative and summative feedback.

=== Criticism and challenges ===
Scholars note ongoing debates in the field. Challenges include inconsistent terminology, tension between educational institutions and workplace recognition systems, and the difficulty of balancing measurement with recognition. Some critiques highlight the risk of over-instrumentalising WBL for employability while neglecting its broader epistemological and social dimensions.

== Sources ==
This article incorporates text from a free content work. Licensed under CC-BY-SA IGO 3.0 (license statement/permission). Text taken from Level-setting and recognition of learning outcomes: The use of level descriptors in the twenty-first century, 115, Keevey, James; Chakroun, Borhene, UNESCO. UNESCO.

== See also ==
- Work-integrated learning
- Career and technical education
