= Roger G. H. Downer =

Irish educator, scientist and writer (1942–2022)

Roger George Hamill Downer (21 December 1942 – 19 November 2022) was an Irish educator, scientist, and writer who held a number of non-executive positions on private and public sector boards. He was a president emeritus at the University of Limerick and a distinguished professor emeritus at the University of Waterloo.

== Early life and education ==
Downer was born in Belfast on 21 December 1942 to Leslie and Edith Downer. He was educated at the Methodist College Belfast, Queen's University Belfast (B.Sc. 1963, M.Sc., 1967, D.Sc. 1984) and University of Western Ontario (Ph.D. 1970).

== Education ==
Downer married Jean Taylor, a physiotherapist, on 2 April 1966. They had three children, Kevin, Kathleen and Tara, and eight grandchildren.

Downer died on 19 November 2022, at the age of 79.

== Career ==
=== Academic ===
Downer spent most of his academic career at the University of Waterloo, where he held successively the positions of assistant professor, associate professor and professor of biology and was cross-appointed to the Department of Chemistry. He spent sabbatical leaves at the Institute of Low Temperature Science, Hokkaido University, and the Department of Biochemistry, Oxford University. During his tenure at the University of Waterloo, Professor Downer was an early recipient of the university's annual Distinguished Teacher Award.

Downer was the author or co-author of 164 scientific papers and/or chapters, and editor or co-editor of four books. Thirty-eight postgraduate students or post-doctoral researchers studied in his laboratory. The primary thrust of his research was directed towards an understanding of the biochemistry and physiology of insects and resulted in his consulting with a number of multinational agrichemical companies in the general area of insecticide discovery.

=== Academic leadership ===
At the University of Waterloo, Downer was head of the Department of Biology, as well as acting dean of science, and vice-president, external, and he has served also as president and chief executive, Asian Institute of Technology (1996-1998); president and vice-chancellor, University of Limerick (1998-2006). During his tenure at the University of Limerick, there was marked increase in student numbers and research productivity (postgraduate student numbers, research income and research output), he oversaw substantial physical expansion of the university and a new postgraduate entry medical school was announced one month after his retirement.

Other senior leadership roles include: chair, Canadian Heads of University Biology Departments; president, Canadian Society of Zoologists; vice-president, Biological Council of Canada; vice-president, Huntsman Marine Biology Laboratory; chair, Council of Heads of Irish Universities; co-founder and co-chair, Irish Universities Association; member of council of European Universities Association; chair, Natural Sciences and Engineering Research Council of Canada (NSERC) Grant Selection Committee in Zoology; chair, NSERC Grant Selection Committee in Food and Agriculture; member National Science Foundation Grant Selection Committee in Regulatory Biology; chair of numerous institutional and disciplinary review committees in North America, Asia and Europe; member of Quality Assessment panels in North America and Europe; chair, Planning Committee for establishment of University of Luxembourg.

=== Non-executive appointments ===
Downer has served as non-executive director of Westaim Corporation, Nucryst Pharmaceuticals, Shannon Development Corporation, Waterloo Economic Development Committee, Canadian Clay and Glass Museum, JF Kennedy Foundation, Irish Peace Institute (Chair), National Portrait Collection (Chair), Birr Scientific and Heritage Foundation (Chair), Hunt Museum (Chair), Munster Rugby Board (Chair), Foynes Flying Boat Museum, Irish Rugby Players Association Player Services Council, UL Bohemians Rugby Football Club (co-president), Limerick Enterprise Development Partnership, Irish Red Cross, Washington Ireland Programme, JP McManus All Ireland Scholarships, Royal Irish Academy (Senior Vice-president).

== Awards and honours ==
FEJ Fry Gold medal of Canadian Society of Zoologists, Gold medal of Entomological Society of Canada, Doctor of Science (honoris causa) University of Waterloo, Doctor of Laws (honoris causa), Queens University of Belfast, Fellow of Royal Society of Canada, Member of the Royal Irish Academy. A collection of Professor Downer's speeches as president of the University of Limerick "Reflections from the Shannon" (Wordwell Press, 2007) was published at the time of his retirement.
