= Lewis Glucksman =

American businessman

- Born: December 22, 1925; Manhattan
- Died: July 5, 2006 (aged 80); Cobh, County Cork
- Education: College of William and Mary; New York University
- Occupation: CEO of Lehman Brothers, Kuhn, Loeb Inc.
- Spouse: Loretta Brennan Glucksman
- Children: Mary Salinger Glucksman; Jane Salinger Glucksman; John Cooney (step-child); Christopher Cooney (step-child); Kate Cooney Picco (step-child)

Lewis L. Glucksman (December 22, 1925 – July 5, 2006) was a former Lehman Brothers trader and former chief executive officer and chairman of Lehman Brothers, Kuhn, Loeb Inc.

== Early life and education ==
Glucksman was born into a second generation Hungarian Jewish family that lived on the Upper West Side of Manhattan, New York City. He served as a teenage volunteer with the US Navy in World War II. Glucksman graduated from the College of William and Mary and later earned a Master's degree in business administration from New York University. The National University of Ireland granted him an honorary Ph.D. in 2002.

== Career ==
Glucksman had a distinguished career on Wall Street. He joined the staff of privately held Lehman Brothers in 1963. After rising from head of sales and trading at Lehman to co-CEO, Glucksman, described then as "gruff and tough" beat Pete Peterson, a former United States Secretary of Commerce for control of the then-closely held firm in 1983, a battle documented in the 1986 book Greed and Glory on Wall Street by Ken Auletta.

Shortly after Glucksman took control, however, the firm experienced a sharp drop in profits. That resulted in a forced sale by Lehman's partners to American Express in 1984. American Express paid $360 million for the firm. Glucksman joined Primerica Financial Services after Citigroup Inc. founder Sanford Weill acquired the company in 1988. He also served as Commissioner of the Port Authority of New York and New Jersey.

== Ireland and philanthropy ==
He travelled to Ireland frequently in his role as a trustee of New York University to promote academic relationships between Irish academia and NYU. He established a home in Cobh, County Cork in 1984 with his wife Loretta Brennan Glucksman and lived there from 1999.

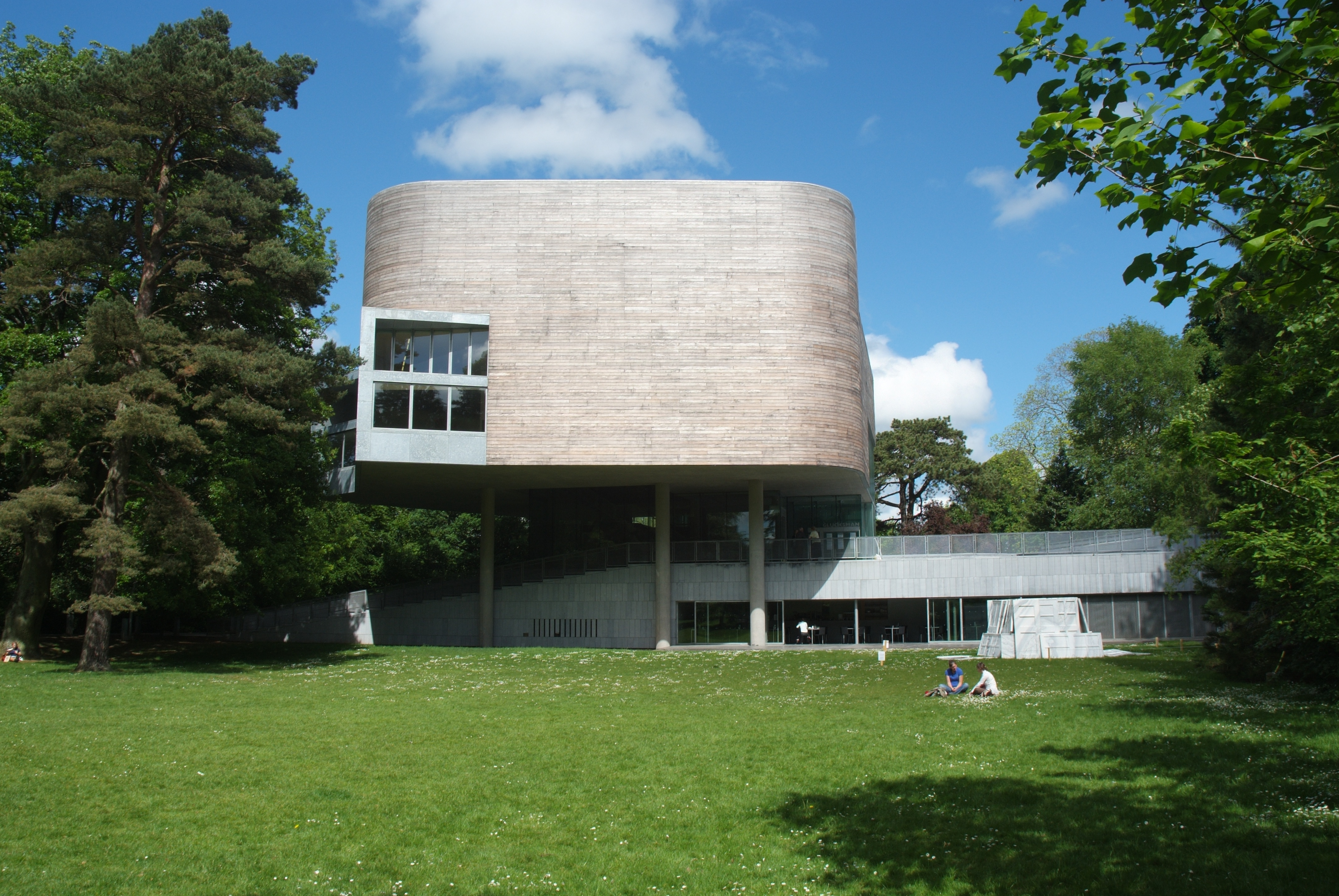
Lewis Glucksman Gallery, Cork

Glucksman directed much of his philanthropy towards projects of benefit to the promotion of culture in Ireland. These included the transfer of the Coastal and Marine Research Centre from UCC to waterfront premises at Cork Harbour; his patronage of the Lewis Glucksman Gallery at UCC and the Glucksman Chair of Literature and the Glucksman Library and Reading Room at the University of Limerick; his support for the Millennium Wing of the National Gallery of Ireland; his 1993 founding of Glucksman Ireland House at New York University as a centre of Irish culture, language, literature and music; and his participation in The Ireland Funds.

The Glucksman Institute for Research in Securities Markets (formed at NYU Stern) is endowed by a grant from Lewis Glucksman, Stern MBA '1951. It offers faculty and student grants to support research on equities, bonds, futures, options, and other financial instruments and on the markets where they are traded.

== Personal life and death ==
In 1987, Glucksman married Loretta Brennan an Irish American. She had three children from her first marriage. Glucksman died at his home in Cobh in 2006, aged 80. He was survived by his wife and his daughters Mary Salinger Glucksman and Jane Salinger Glucksman; and three stepchildren, John Cooney, Christopher Cooney, and Kate Cooney Picco.
