= University of Limerick =

University in Ireland, founded as NIHE Limerick

- Ollscoil Luimnigh
- Motto: Eagna chun Gnímh (Irish)
- Motto in English: Wisdom for Action
- Type: Public
- Established: In 1972 as National Institute of Higher Education, Limerick; In 1989 as the University of Limerick
- Affiliations: AUA; EUA; LAOTSE; IUA; UI
- Chancellor: Brigid Laffan
- President: Shane Kilcommins
- Provost: Ann Ledwith (interim)
- Faculty: 2,000 (2024)
- Students: 18,000 (2024)
- Undergraduates: 13,155 (2023)
- Postgraduates: 4,490 (2023)
- Location: National Technological Park; Limerick V94 T9PX, Limerick, Ireland; 52.674°N 8.571°W
- Campus: Suburban – 340 acres (137.6 ha)
- Colours: Green, White, Grey
- Website: ul.ie

University of Limerick (UL; Irish: Ollscoil Luimnigh) is a public research university in Limerick, Ireland. Founded in 1972, as the National Institute for Higher Education, Limerick, it became a university in September 1989 in accordance with the University of Limerick Act 1989. It was the first university established since Irish independence in 1922, followed by the establishment of Dublin City University.

UL's campus lies along both sides of the River Shannon, on a 137.5-hectare (340-acre) site with 46 hectares (110 acres) on the north bank and 91.5 hectares (226 acres) on the south bank at Plassey, County Limerick, 5 kilometres (3.1 mi) from the city centre. It has over 18,000 full-time undergraduate students, including over 2,400 international students, and 1,500 part-time students. There are over 800 research postgraduates and 1,300 postgraduate students receiving instruction at the university. Its co-operative education ("co-op") programme offers students an up to eight-month work placement as part of their degree; it was Ireland's first such programme.

Following founding president Edward M. Walsh, Roger GH Downer, John O'Connor, Don Barry, Des Fitzgerald and Kerstin Mey were presidents of UL from 1998 to August 2024. The current president of the University is Professor Shane Kilcommins, having served as acting president from 2024 to 21 April 2026, the date upon which he was appointed as president by the University's Governing Authority.

== History ==
=== University campaign ===
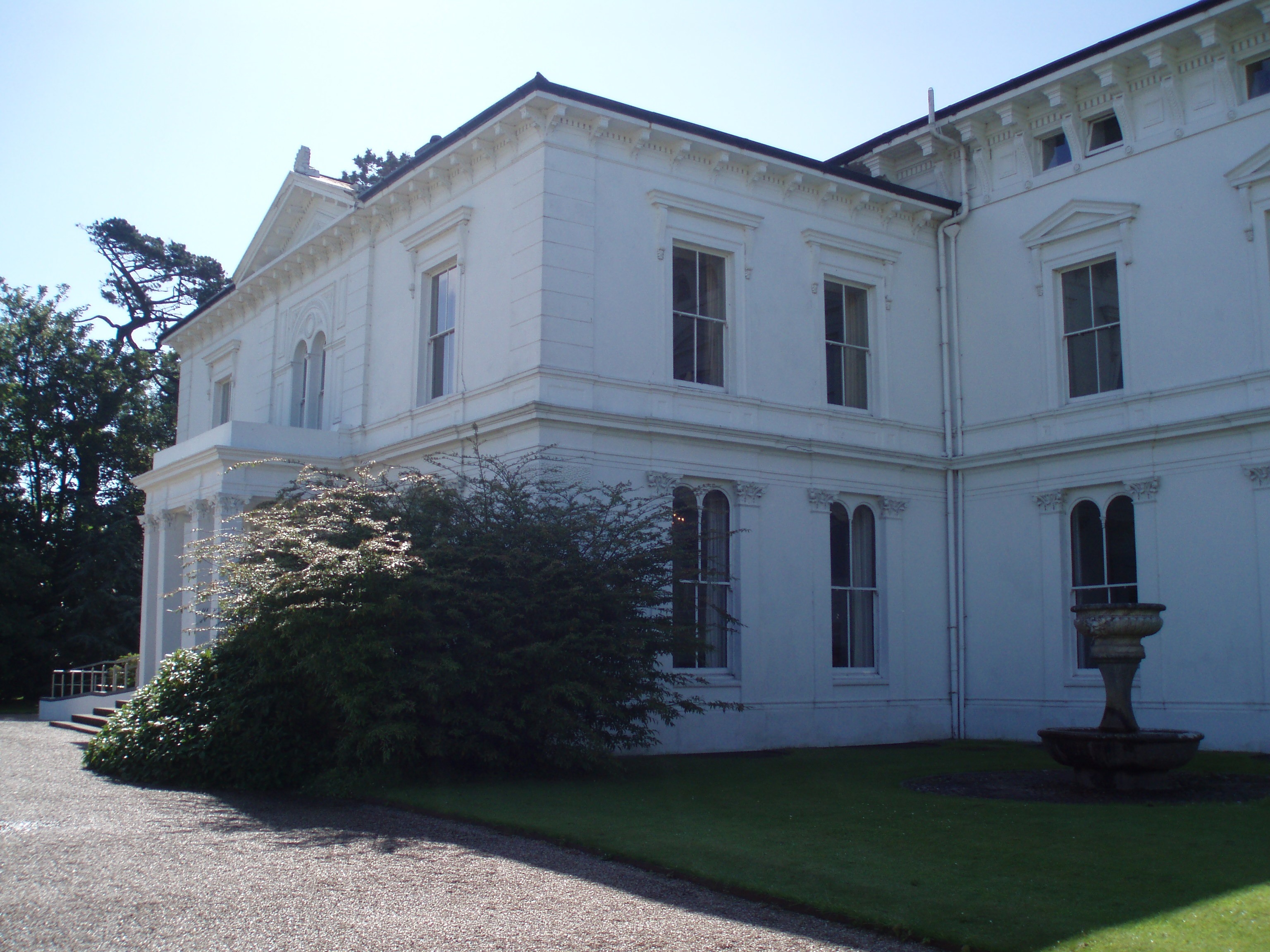
Plassey House, built in the eighteenth century, now houses the President's Office and displays the university's ceremonial mace.

According to founding president Edward M. Walsh, the mayor of Limerick applied for a college of the planned Queen's University of Ireland to be established in the city. However, in 1850, Queen's College, Belfast, Cork and Galway were established instead. In 1908 there was an attempt to link the National University of Ireland and Mungret College, about five kilometres from Limerick. Mungret offered bachelor's- and master's-level courses in the faculty of arts, with degrees conferred by the Royal University of Ireland, from 1888 to 1908. The university was dissolved in 1909 and replaced by the National University of Ireland, marking the end of tertiary education at Mungret. Degrees were awarded to students at Mungret College by the NUI from 1909 to 1912 to accommodate students who had matriculated at the Royal University.

The campaign for a university in Limerick began in earnest by the late 1950s. The Limerick University Project Committee was founded in September 1959 by the mayor of Limerick in 1957, Ted Russell. Another supporter, Dermot Kinlen, was a High Court judge and the first state inspector general of prisons and places of detention. Russell and Kinlen received honorary degrees from the university in 2002.

=== National Institute for Higher Education, Limerick ===
The introduction in 1966 of free second-level education in Ireland by the then Education Minister Donogh O'Malley, who was also TD for East Limerick, also influenced Irish third-level education.

O'Malley bought the current 340 acre UL Plassey site for the State from the Bugler family in 1967 - and his plans for nine Institutes of Higher Education followed by successful economic-development policies during the 1960s led to an influx of foreign investment into Ireland and demand for expertise not met by the existing universities. Ireland established the National Institute for Higher Education (NIHE) at Limerick, modelled on the technological universities of continental Europe, and perhaps the polytechnic approach being developed in the UK. Edward Walsh took office as chairman of the planning board and director of the institute on 1 January 1970. This more twentieth-century and continental approach is illustrated by its use of funding from the World Bank, European Investment Bank and philanthropists. Construction on phase one, for example, used financing from the World Bank. Faculty and staff were recruited internationally, and they — in addition to extensive teaching and research facilities — attracted foreign investment led by Analog Devices (which manufactured Ireland's first silicon chips).

The first students were enrolled in 1972, when the institute was opened by Taoiseach Jack Lynch. The European Investment Bank financed the second phase of development. Billionaire philanthropist Chuck Feeney was a major donor to the university. Shannon Development was also an early supporter of the project, supporting the NIHE proposal to establish the National Technological Park as an integrated campus.

A change of government resulted in NIHE Limerick applying for recognition as a recognised college of the National University of Ireland, which awarded degrees to its graduates in 1977. After strong opposition by students and others, NIHE Limerick withdrew from the NUI and was established as an independent institution. From 1978 to 1988, the National Council for Educational Awards (NCEA) was the degree-awarding authority for NIHE Limerick.

=== University status ===
In 1989, NIHE Limerick was established by legislation as the University of Limerick and NIHE Dublin was established as Dublin City University, each with the power to award its own degrees. These became the first institutes since Irish independence to be given the title "university".

Expansion occurred in 1991, after the incorporation of Thomond College of Education, Limerick. Thomond, sharing a common campus, was founded in 1973 as the National College of Physical Education and became the department of educational and professional studies, focusing on secondary education. Since 1991, degrees from Mary Immaculate College have also been awarded by UL. MIC degrees are offered in primary education and arts programmes, and degrees awarded at St. Patrick's College, Thurles have been conferred by UL since 2012. University history under the leadership of founding president Edward M Walsh is profiled in Walsh's 2011 memoir, Upstart: Friends, Foes and Founding a University.

Elements of the US university system were adopted, including cooperative education, grade point average marking and the trimester system. During the 1970s, limited public financing led Walsh and his team to seek World Bank and European Investment Bank funding. Sophisticated private-sector fundraising programmes were later developed, based on US university models and guided by an international leadership board under founding chair Chuck Feeney and Lewis Glucksman. The campus developed primarily as a result of such fundraising activity.

The university has been an active participant in the European Union's Erasmus Programme since 1988 and has 207 partner institutions in 24 European countries. In addition, UL students may study at partner universities in the US, Canada, Australia, New Zealand, Brazil, China and Singapore.

UL allied with NUI Galway in 2010, sharing resources.

=== Presidents ===
- Edward M. Walsh, founding president (1972–1998)
- Roger Downer (1998–2006)
- John O'Connor (2006–2007)
- Don Barry (2007–2017)
- Desmond Fitzgerald (2017–2020)
- Kerstin Mey (interim from 2020, confirmed 2021–2024)
- Shane Kilcommins (acting from 2024 to April 2026)
- Shane Kilcommins(2026 -2036)

== Organisation ==
=== Governance ===
In accordance with legislation, the university is directed by a policy-making Governing Authority, whose functions are outlined in the National Institute for Higher Education, Limerick, Act, 1980, amended in the University of Limerick Act, 1989, which raised the institution's status to that of a university and provided for related matters. There are several other important acts concerning the college include the Universities Act, 1997, which allows for the creation of University Statutes.

The Governing Authority's 29 members are chosen by a wide range of groups and authorities and include members elected by staff (in various classes) and students (ex-officio based on elections of Students Union officers).

The university is headed, titularly, by the Chancellor. As of 2023, the Chancellor of the University of Limerick is Brigid Laffan. Previous chancellors included Miriam Hederman O'Brien, Seán Donlon and Mary Harney.

=== Faculty ===
The 1,000-seat University Concert Hall, seen from a water fountain on the main campus

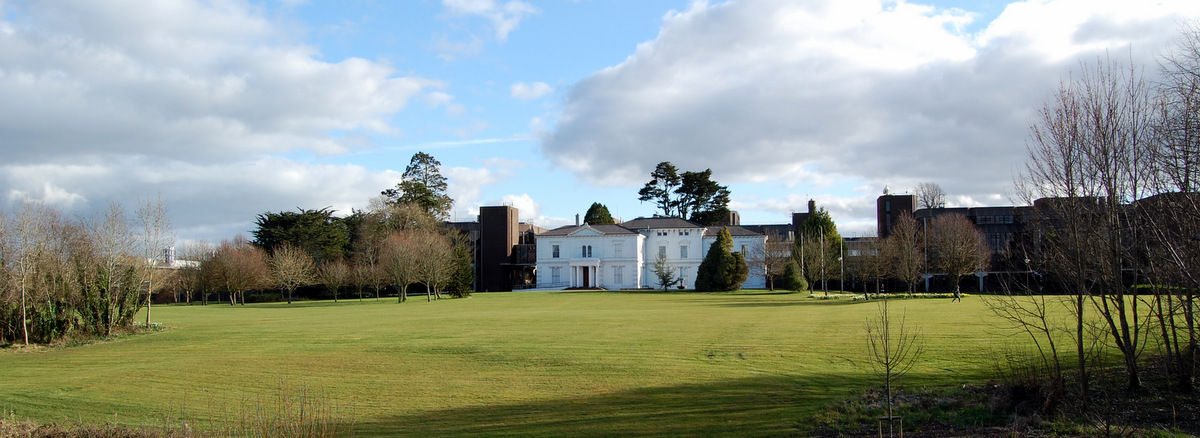
Plassey House, on the River Shannon

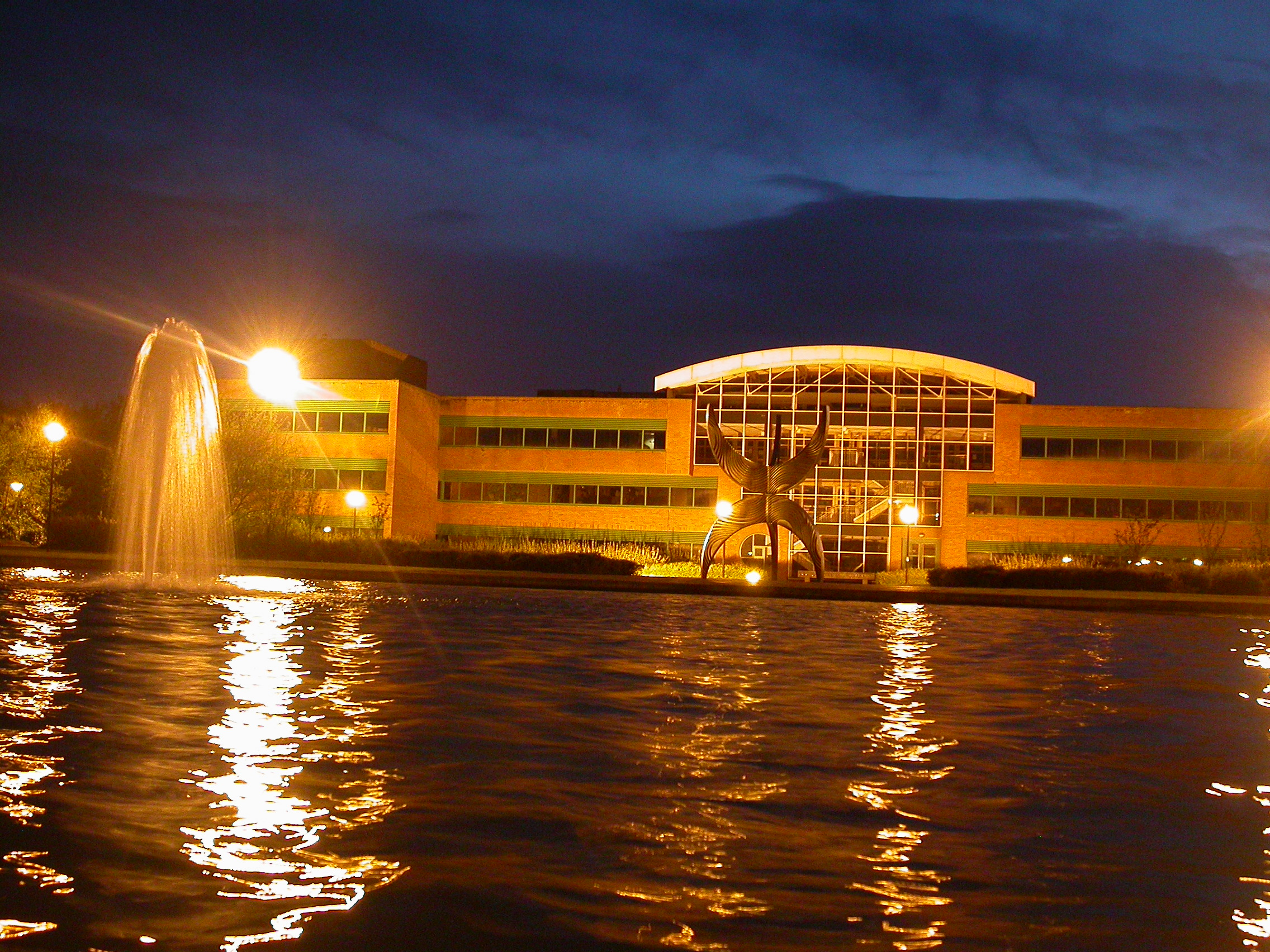
UL's Schumann Building

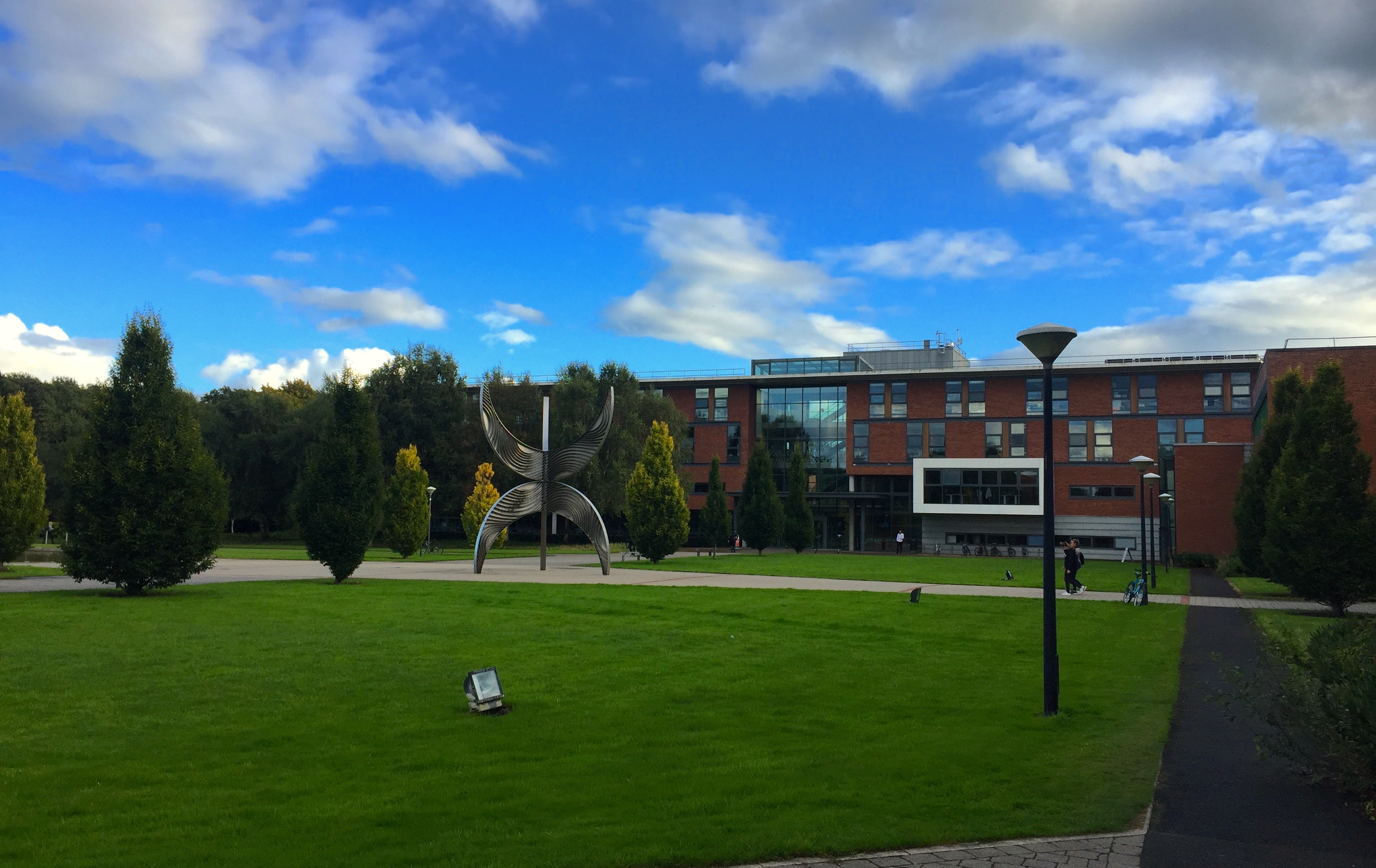
Kemmy Business School

The university has four faculties:

- Kemmy Business School (Scoil Ghnó Kemmy)
- Faculty of Education and Health Sciences (including the Graduate Medical School)
- Faculty of Science and Engineering
- Faculty of Arts, Humanities and Social Sciences

Two colleges are linked to the university: Mary Immaculate College and MIC, St. Patrick's Campus, Thurles.

Kemmy Business School has Triple Crown accreditation (AACSB, EQUIS and AMBA). It has four academic departments, which are Accounting & Finance, Economics, Management & Marketing, and Work & Employment Studies. The school's courses include accounting, finance, economics, marketing, and risk management among other courses. Named after the former mayor of Limerick, Jim Kemmy, the business school has both undergraduate and postgraduate courses on offer.

The Faculty of Arts, Humanities, and Social Sciences currently offers the only English-language master's degree in technical communication outside of the United States

=== Students ===
UL has a students' union, branded as UL Student Life (ULSL). It is presided over by four sabbatical officers: a president, an academic officer, a welfare officer and a Diversity and Inclusion officer. Policy decisions are made by the student council and ratified by the Board of Directors, which is a body composed of student and external Directors. The union is the representative body for the 18,000 undergraduate UL students. It operates from their office in the new student centre which has space for students to relax. Unlike other Irish students' unions, its Constitution cannot be amended by referendums and must instead obtain the support of no less than 75% of its Directors.

The university also has a postgraduate students' union with a full-time, sabbatical postgraduate president and two VPs, one for Academics and one for Engagement. It is one of two Irish universities with such a setup.

=== Clubs and societies ===
UL has over 70 student-run clubs and societies. Clubs are supported by the students' union, the sports department and the arts office. In March 2014, the clubs and societies refused to recognise the Pro-Life Society—the first society not recognised by the student council. Since then, every new club or society must be voted on by the council and undergo a trial period (usually 14 weeks).

=== President's Volunteer Award ===
The President's Volunteer Award (PVA), administered by the university's community-liaison office, was established to harness, acknowledge and support the contributions which students at the University of Limerick make to their communities. It draws on a strong tradition of student volunteerism on and off-campus. The PVA's primary goals are:

- To sustain and foster a culture of volunteerism, active citizenship and civic engagement among the student population
- To develop collaborative projects and further existing initiatives between UL and the community
- To formally acknowledge and support the contributions which UL student volunteers make to the community
- To promote the development of civic and leadership skills in students.

=== Rankings ===
University rankings

Global – Overall
- ARWU World: 801–900 (2023)
- QS World: =401 (2026)
- THE World: 401–500 (2024)
- THE Young Universities: 126 (2021)

The university is ranked fourth in attracting students who attain over 500 points on the Leaving Certificate. It is the only college in Ireland to receive a maximum five stars for its sports facilities.

UL is ranked 426th worldwide in the 2024 QS World University Rankings and 401–500 in the 2024 Times Higher Education World University Rankings.

It was the 2015 University of the Year in the Sunday Times' Good University Guide because of the university's record in graduate employability, improved academic performance, the €52-million Bernal Project and a strong record in research commercialisation. UL is Ireland's only university to receive five stars for graduate employability and teaching in the 2011–12 QS reports. The school also received five stars for infrastructure, internationalisation, innovation and engagement.

== Science and engineering ==
Materials and Surface Science Institute (MSSI)
The MSSI, established in 1998, generates fundamental research on topics of industrial significance in the fields of surface science and materials. The institute's strengths and interests are in four areas: nanomaterials; biomaterials; composite and glass materials, and biocatalysis and clean technology.
Irish Software Research Centre (Lero)
The university hosts (Lero), the Irish Software Research Centre. Lero was established in November 2005 with support from the Science Foundation Ireland’s CSET (Centre for Science, Engineering and Technology) programme as a collaborative organisation for software-engineering research activities at UL (the lead partner), Dublin City University (DCU), Trinity College Dublin (TCD) and University College Dublin (UCD). In its third funding period (2014–2020), it has grown to encompass all seven Irish universities (UL, DCU, NUI Galway, Maynooth University, TCD, University College Cork and UCD), the Dundalk Institute of Technology, and 29 national and international industrial partners for a volume of €46.4 million. Its scope now encompasses all software-related research.
Interaction Design Centre (IDC)
The centre, established in 1996, is an interdisciplinary research group in the department of computer science and information systems focused on the design, use and evaluation of information and communications technology ranging from media installations and interfaces to technological field studies.
Localisation Research Centre
The LRC was established in 1995 as the Localisation Resources Centre at University College Dublin (UCD) and moved to UL in 1999, where it became the LRC—the information, research and educational centre for the localisation industry in Ireland, offering the world's first MSc degree in multilingual computing and localisation. The LRC leads localisation research in the Centre for Next Generation Localisation (CNGL), established with support from Science Foundation Ireland. In 2009 the LRC spun off the Rosetta Foundation, promoting social localisation and supporting the Action for Global Information Sharing network. In 2011, it signed a memorandum of understanding with the United Nations Economic Commission for Africa (UNECA).
Enterprise Research Centre
The Enterprise Research Centre (ERC) is committed to researching the challenges facing current and next-generation enterprises. Its staff have research and practical experience in modelling, scheduling and management of enterprise optimisation, design and implementation of integrated systems, product innovation, project management and quality-, reliability- and productivity-improvement tools.
Stokes Institute
The Stokes Institute, founded by Cambridge graduate Mark Davies to work on thermofluid problems, is a mechanical-engineering research group working in fluid mechanics, reliability physics, microfluidic cancer diagnostics and energy management. One focus is the engineering of ICT devices. Stokes Bio, an offshoot of the institute, was sold to Life Technologies in 2010.

== The arts ==
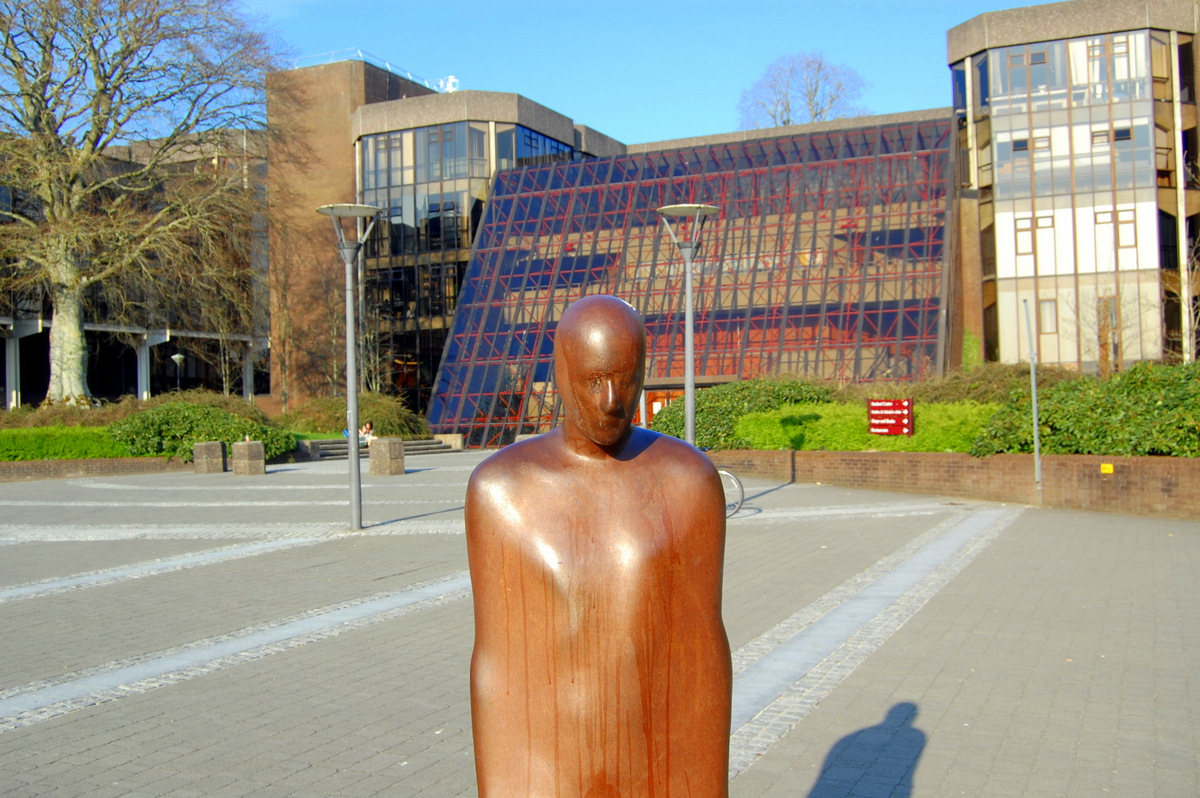
Cast-iron sculpture by Antony Gormley in UL's Central Plaza

UL is home to the Irish World Academy of Music and Dance, a centre for innovation and research in music and dance performance and scholarship, and the Irish Chamber Orchestra (Ireland's leading international chamber orchestra, funded by An Chomhairle Ealaíon (the Irish Arts Council). All three organisations commission and perform new Irish music and dance.

The University Concert Hall (UCH) is UL's principal venue for the performing arts. The 1,000-seat hall was Ireland's first purpose-built concert hall.

The Bourn Vincent Gallery is UL's principal venue for temporary exhibitions, with an ancillary programme of seminars, lectures and performances. UL's art collection includes outdoor sculpture by international artists, including Michael Warren, Peter Logan, Alexandra Wejchert, James McKenna, Tom Fitzgerald, Antony Gormley and (most recently) Sean Scully.

== Housing ==
Many housing districts near UL have a majority-student population, especially in the adjacent Castletroy area. In recent years, several large student apartment complexes have been built a 15-20-minute walk from UL with Section 50 tax incentives. Unlike most similar Irish higher education institutes, much housing is on-campus; there are six on-campus student accommodation complexes, called "villages", the newest opening in 2006.

The oldest housing decvelopment is Plassey Village, opposite UL's main gate. Accommodating 424 students in terraced houses with four or eight bedrooms and a kitchen-living area, it is primarily occupied by first-year students. Built from 1987 to 1992 in four phases, it has a hall and many small gardens. During the summers of 2010 and 2011, the complexes residences were renovated. Kilmurry Village, the second-oldest complex, is on the eastern side of the campus. It accommodates 540 students in six- or eight-bedroom terraced houses. It is the closest complex to the University Arena, which has an Olympic-standard 50-metre swimming pool, and was built between 1994 and 1997, in two phases. Minor renovations were made during summer 2011, primarily to the kitchens. Dromroe Village, completed in 2001, is on the south bank of the Shannon. A first high-rise building houses 457 students in six-, four- or two-bedroom ensuite apartments.

Thomond Village, which opened for the autumn 2004 semester, included the first university buildings on the north bank of the Shannon, in County Clare. It has accommodation for 504 students in six-, four-, two- and one-bedroom apartments. Cappavilla Village, opened in September 2006 on the North Bank near the new Health Sciences Building. An extension of Cappavilla opened in September 2007. Quigley Village, the newest accommodation complex within UL, is located on the North Bank adjacent to the Graduate Medical School. This complex is only for postgraduate students but shares management and reception resources with Cappavilla Village. It has accommodation for 100 residents in two-, four-bedroom apartments.

Many off-campus student accommodations vary in distance from the campus. Elm Park, College Court, Briarfield and Oaklawns are popular estates with many student residences. Troy Student Village and Courtyard Hall, privately managed student residences slightly further from the campus, are served by a shuttle bus.

== Sport ==
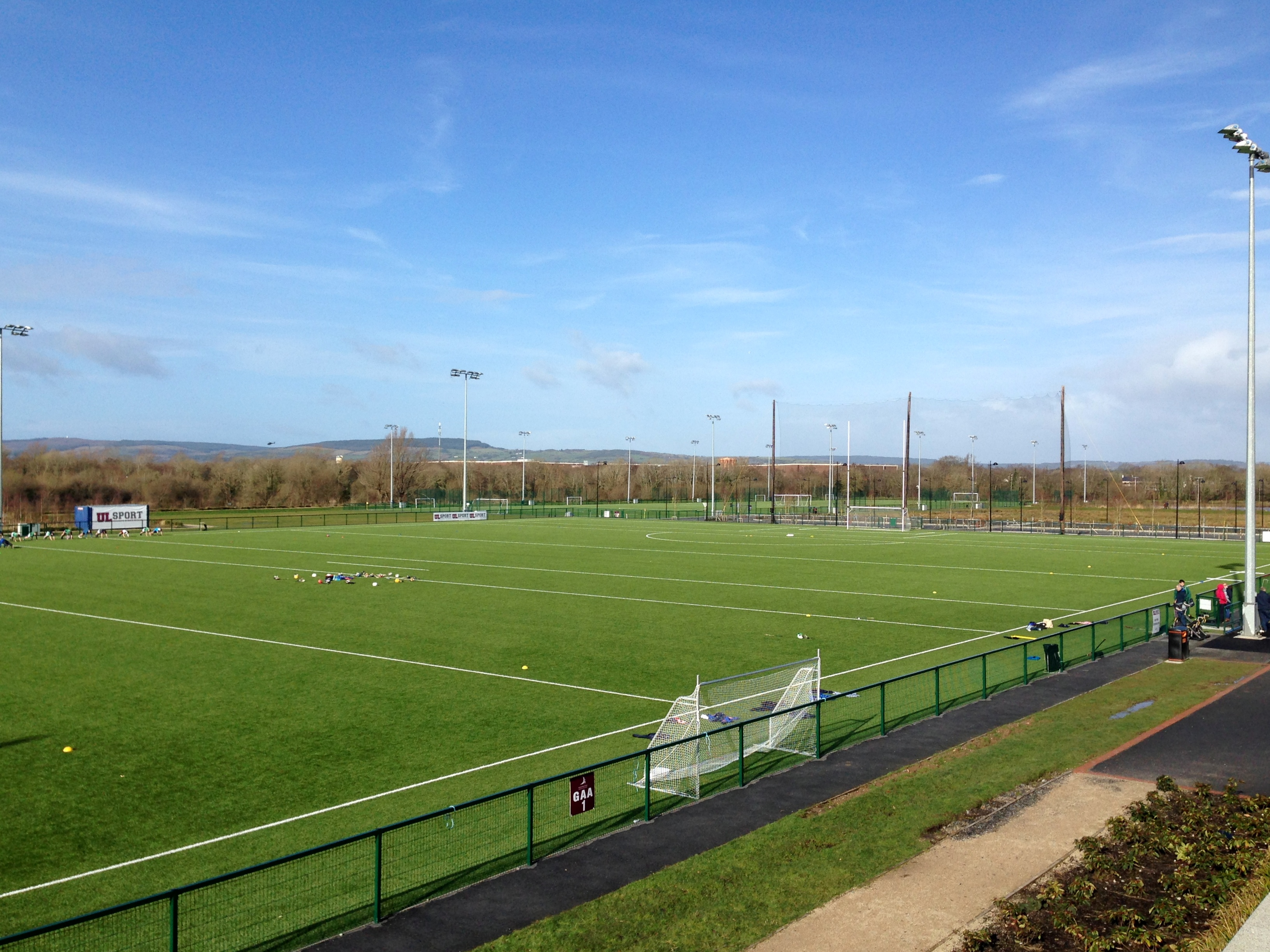
UL's North Campus playing fields

=== University Arena ===
The on-campus University Arena is Ireland's largest indoor sports complex. Open since 2002, it consists of the National 50m Swimming Pool. The arena's 3,600-square-metre (4,300 sq yd) Indoor Sports Hall has four wooden courts for a variety of sports, a sprint track, an international 400 m athletics track and a 200 m, three-lane, suspended jogging track. The facility has a cardiovascular and strength-training centre, a weight-training room, team rooms, an aerobics studio and classrooms. The arena is often used by the Munster rugby team.

Its €28 million development was made possible with €7.6 million in government grants, a €6.9 million donation from the University of Limerick Foundation, about €4 million in student contributions and commercial funding. Each year, it accommodates over 500,000 customers and many international athletes and teams.

The arena hosted the 2010 Special Olympics Ireland Games, from 9 to 13 June. In one of the year's largest Irish sporting events, 1,900 Special Olympians from throughout Ireland participated in the games.

=== All-weather sports complex ===
UL's €9 million, all-weather sports complex on the North Campus is the largest all-weather sports-field complex in Europe. The multi-purpose, floodlit, artificial turf park has two soccer, one rugby and one GAA pitch. Third-generation all-weather surfaces are similar to natural grass and are designed for full contact. Each full-size pitch can be sub-divided to create smaller playing areas for various sports. The largest artificial-grass development in Ireland to date, it is designed to World Rugby, GAA and FIFA specifications.

The synthetic surface reduces the risk of injury caused by hard or uneven surfaces. The Sports Pavilion Building has changing rooms, squad and coaching rooms and bar, restaurant and conference facilities. The complex is funded from a number of sources, including operating income and campus-based commercial activities.

The playing pitches opened in July 2011, and the Sports Pavilion was expected to open in November 2011. The facility is available to the general public as well as the campus community. In addition to these facilities, conventional playing fields, tennis courts, an artificial-turf pitch, an outdoor athletics track and the University Boathouse are on the Limerick side of the river. The boathouse has Ireland's only indoor rowing tank, which can accommodate up to 8 rowers simultaneously. The tank can simulate a variety of water conditions, providing training opportunities for rowers to reach international standards. The building also includes a launch jetty into the Shannon, a pontoon and a café.

== Expansion ==
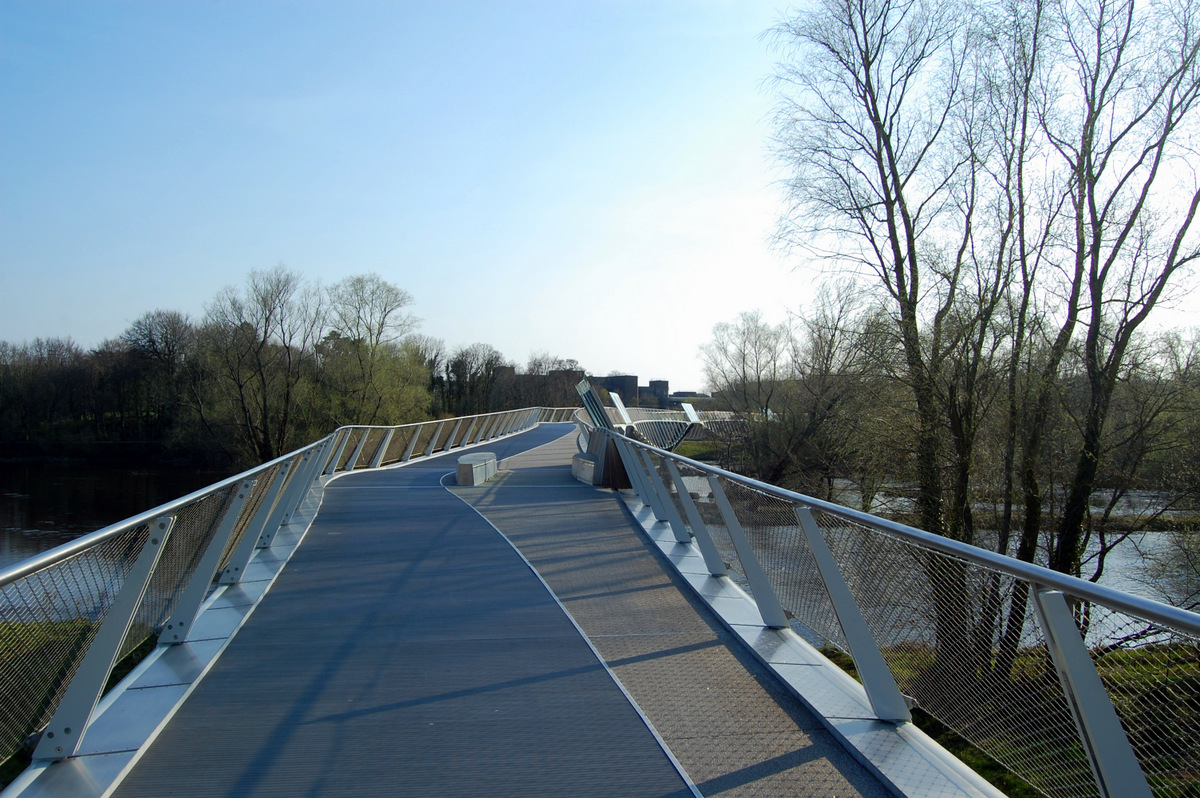
The Living Bridge over the Shannon on the UL campus

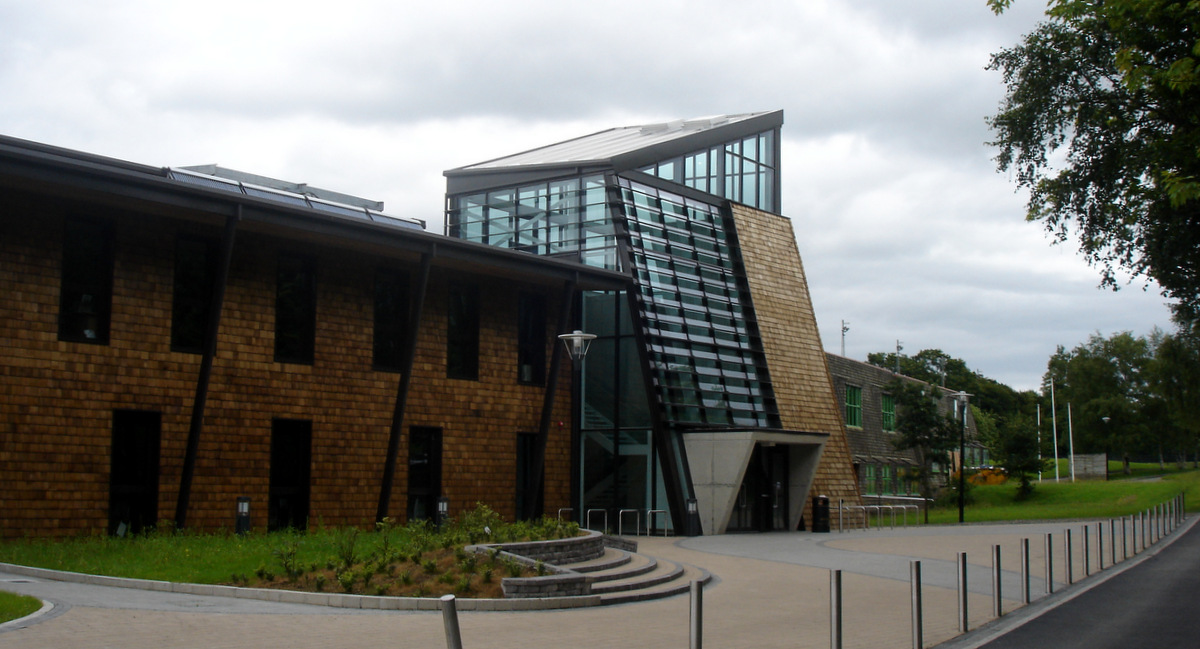
The renovated Physical Education and Sport Sciences building

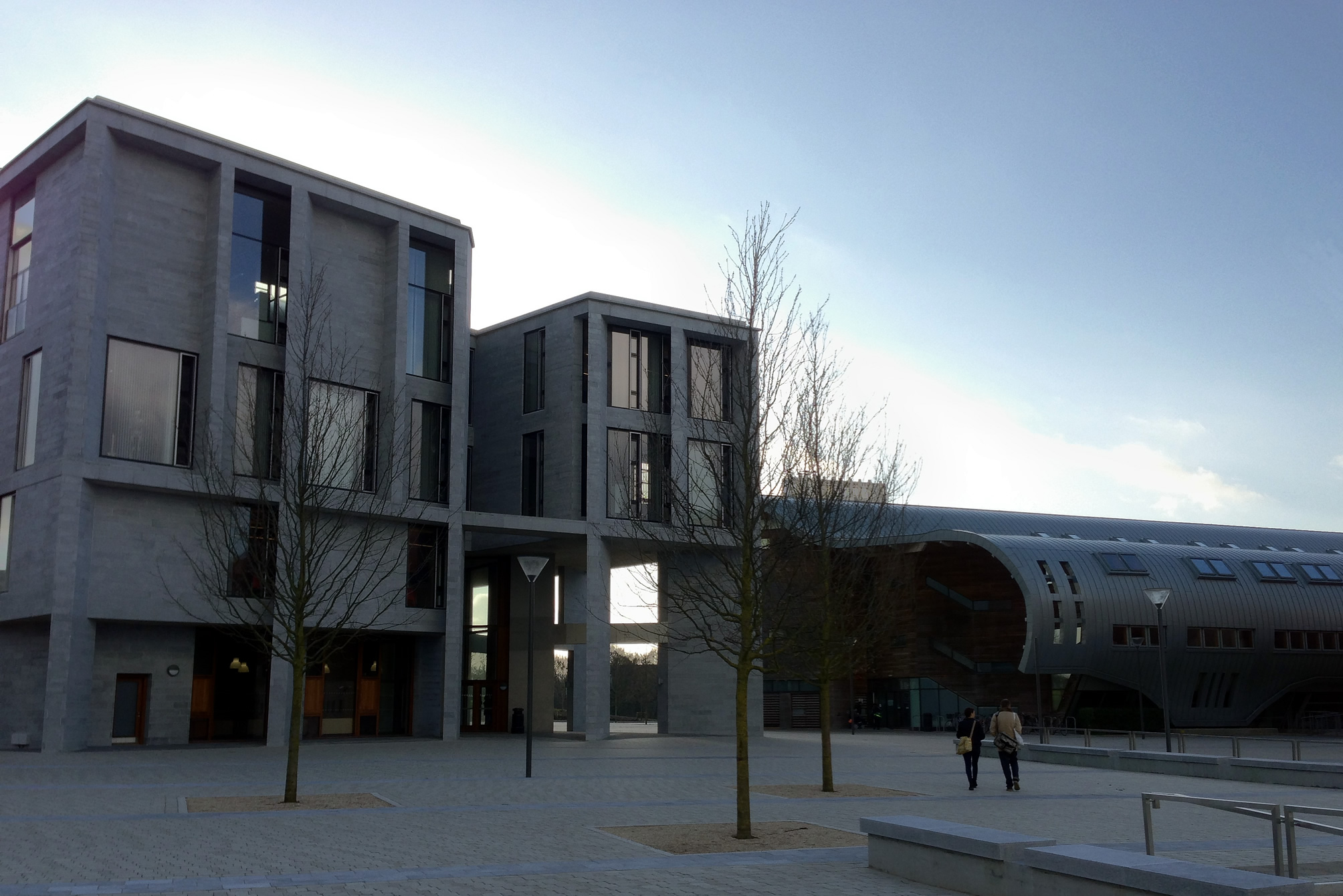
The School of Medicine building, which was shortlisted for the Stirling Prize in architecture

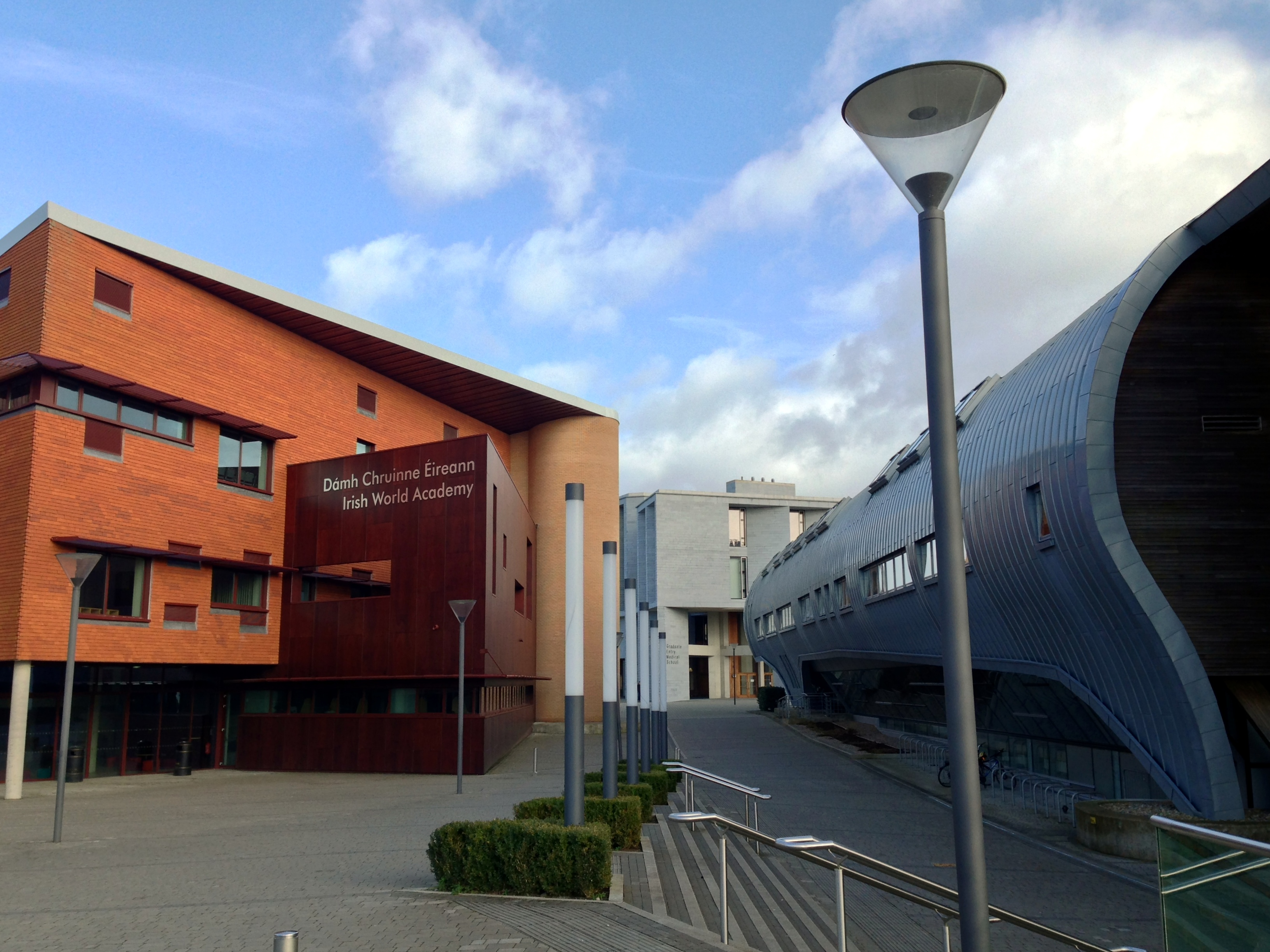
The Irish World Academy (left) and the Health Sciences building, with the School of Medicine in the background

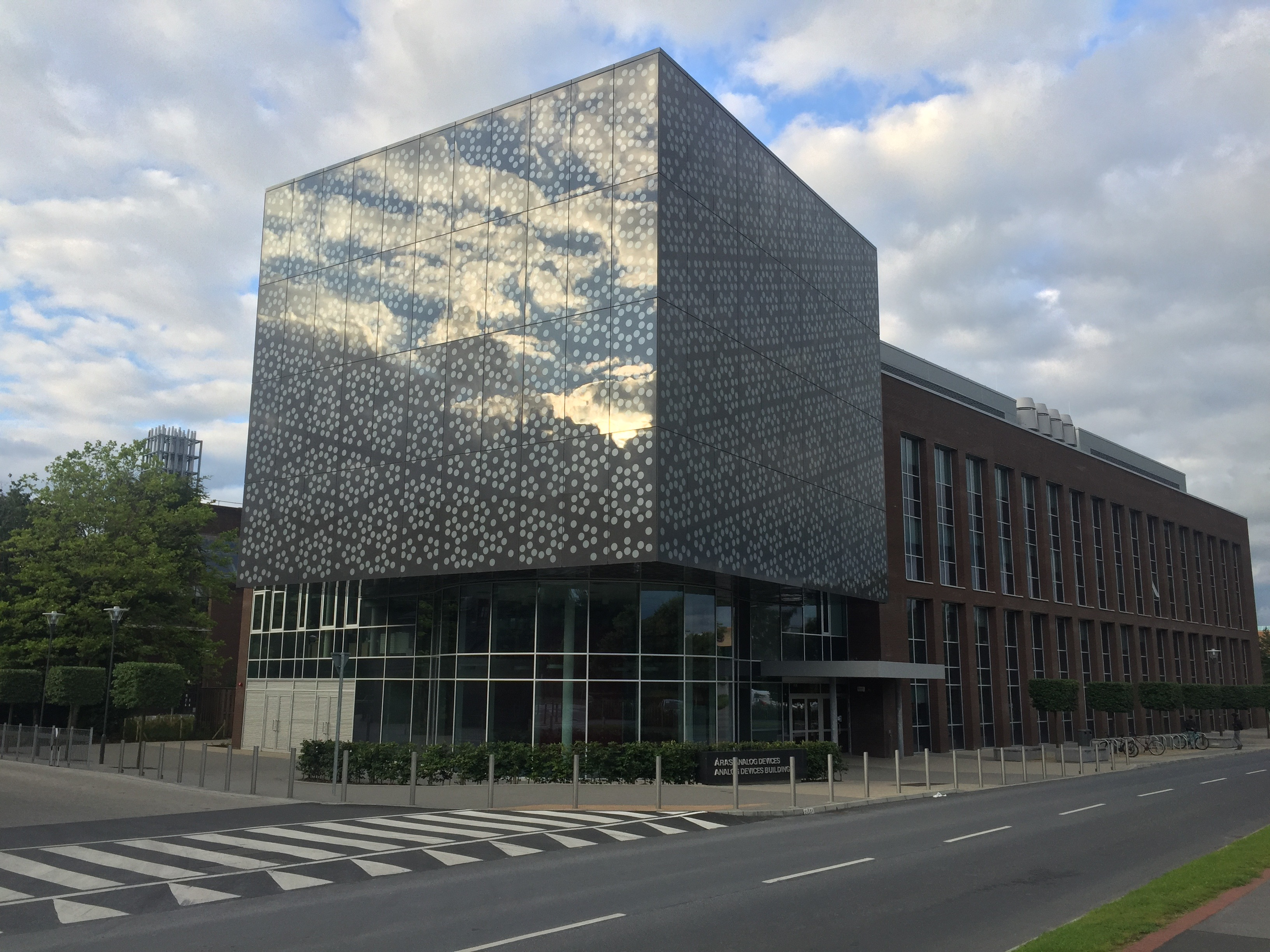
Analog Devices Building

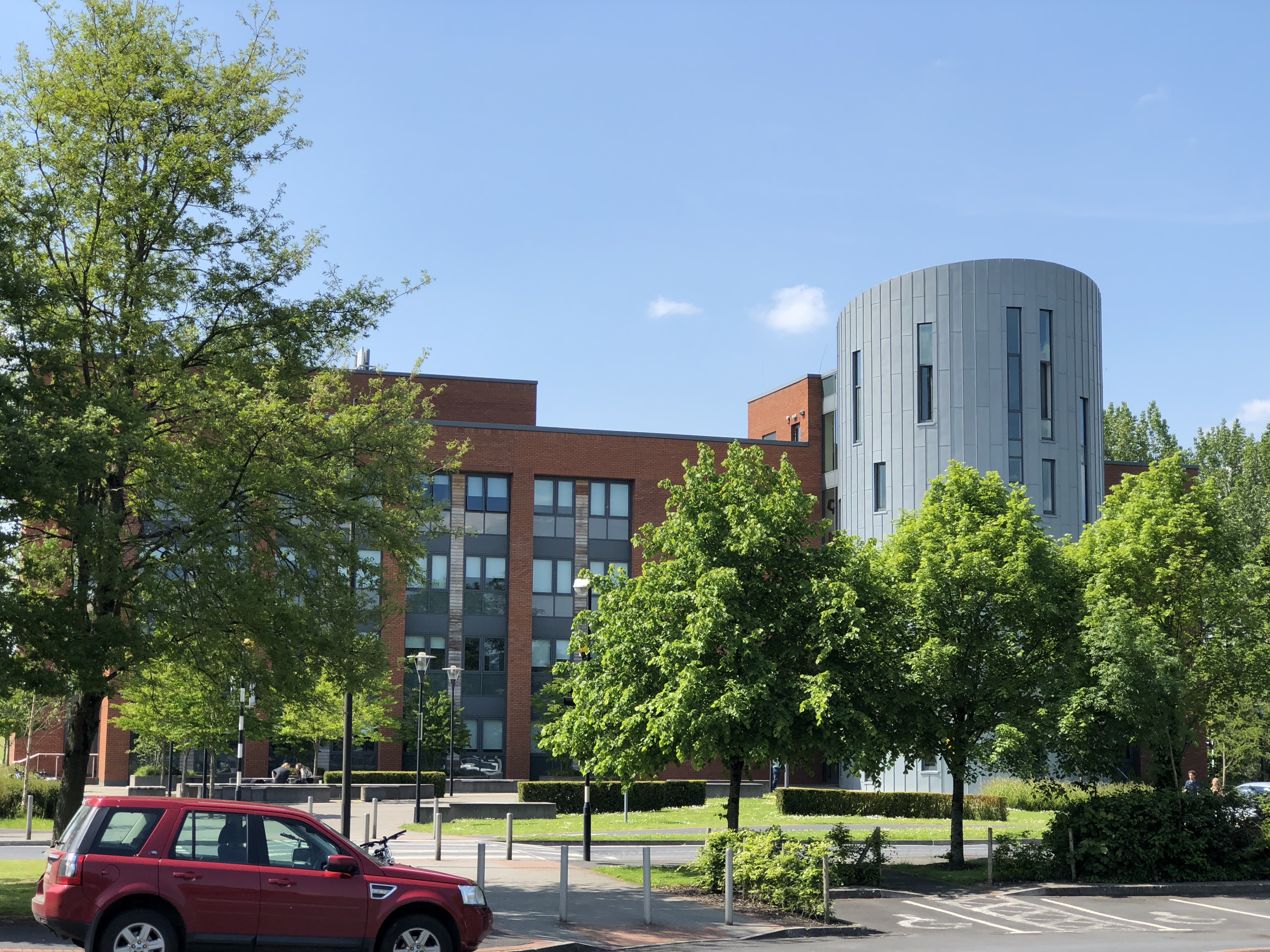
Tierney Building, home to Lero and Nexus

The university's Foundation Building, including the University Concert Hall (home to the Irish Chamber Orchestra), the library and several others, were built during the 1990s. The Materials & Surface Science Institute (MSSI) building, Dromroe Student Village, a sports arena and swimming pool were built between 2000 and 2004. In 2005, the Engineering Research Building and Millstream Courtyard buildings opened in a complex near the Foundation Building.

The Kemmy Business School building was constructed next to the Schuman Building, and will be the world's first business school with a live trading floor. Several new buildings have opened on the north bank of the Shannon. The University Bridge, opened in late 2004, provides road and pedestrian access to the planned North Bank campus. Thomond Village was the first North Bank facility (opening in 2004), followed by the Health Sciences Building in 2005. The Living Bridge, a pedestrian bridge, connects the Millstream Courtyard and the Health Sciences Building. Cappavilla Village was completed in mid-2006 on the North Bank; a building for the Irish World Music Centre (formerly in the Foundation Building basement), began construction in May 2007 and was completed in January 2010. An architectural-faculty building is under construction opposite the CSIS building. The university hopes to expand the North Bank campus to the size of the original campus.

=== Construction timeline ===
- 1972 – Physical Education and Sport Sciences Building (originally home to the Thomond College of Education, and renovated in 2012)
- 1974 – Main Building, phase 1A (Blocks A and B)
- 1978 – Schrödinger Building
- 1984 – Main Building, phase 1B (Blocks C—extended in 1996—D and E)
- 1985–99 – Student Centre (including the Students' Union building)
- 1992 – Robert Schuman Building
- 1993 – Foundation Building (with the University Concert Hall)
- 1996 – Kathleen Lonsdale Building
- 1997 – Glucksman Library and Information Services Building
- 1999 – Computer Science Building
- 2000–01 – University Arena
- 2002 – MSSI Building
- 2005 – Engineering Research Building and Millstream Courtyard
- 2005 – Health Sciences Building
- 2007 – Living Bridge
- 2007 – Jim Kemmy Business School
- 2008 – University of Limerick Boathouse (student-funded, with storage and training space for rowing, kayak, mountain-bike and sub-aqua clubs)
- 2008 – Irish Chamber Orchestra Building
- 2009 – Languages Building
- 2009 – Academy of World Music and Dance
- 2011 – School of Medicine (graduate)
- 2011 – Tierney Building
- 2011 – Lero and IEC Building
- 2013 – Bernal Building and MSSI extension
- 2015 – Analog Devices Building
- 2017 – The Stables Club Renovation
- 2018 – Glucksman Library Extension
- 2020 - New Student Centre - Construction of the €20 million building began in 2019, however, the contractor for the project, Keating Construction, collapsed into liquidation in February 2021 with debts of €30 million. Costs had reached €30 million by 2022, and construction recommenced in 2023 with Monami Construction as the new contractor. The centre was completed in 2025 and opened in October of that year.
- 2021 - Climbing Wall Centre

=== Limerick 2030 ===
UL has made a commitment to establishing a presence in Limerick city centre as part of the Limerick 2030 plan to help drive renewal of the city centre. All the university's main faculties are presently in Castletroy, about 5 km from the city centre. Former UL president Don Barry outlined his vision of the plan in July 2013: "My dream is that in a few years’ time, there will be hundreds of students of the university participating in the life of the city, learning in the city, recreating in the city and contributing to the revitalisation of the Limerick city centre. Limerick is our city and we are its university."

== Notable alumni and staff ==
Arts
- Jean Butler, former Riverdance choreographer and artist-in-residence at UL's Irish World Academy
- Patrick Cassidy, composer and 2015 Oscar (long list) nominee
- Colin Dunne, Dance choreographer, best known for his work on Riverdance
- Breandán de Gallaí, Riverdance lead, principal dance instructor and external examiner for the university
- Steph Geremia, Irish-American flute player
- Claire Keville, an Irish concertina and harpsichord player
- William Keohane, Irish writer and poet
- Alice Maher, Irish artist
- Anthony McElligott, Writer and historian
- Sarah McTernan, Irish singer-songwriter
- Nóirín Ní Riain, Irish singer-songwriter
- Marcus Notley, Irish product designer
- Iarla Ó Lionáird, sean-nós singer and record producer
- Mícheál Ó Súilleabháin, Irish musician and pianist
- Matthew Potter, Irish writer and historian
- Niamh Regan, folk singer
- Ciara Sexton, five time world champion professional Irish dancer who toured with the Lord of the Dance
- Sharon Slater, Irish writer and historian
- Aoife Walsh, Irish model

Medicine and Science

- Michael Hinchey, Irish computer scientist
- David Parnas, Canadian software-engineering pioneer
- Ronan Tynan, medical doctor and tenor
- Brian McManus, host of the YouTube channel Real Engineering

Military

- Dermot Earley Snr, former chief of staff of the Irish Defence Forces
- Billy Hedderman, former Irish Army officer

Politics

- Tamar Beruchashvili, Minister of Foreign Affairs of Georgia
- Pat Cox, Irish politician and former president of the European Parliament
- Jimmy Deenihan, TD, former Minister for Arts, Heritage and the Gaeltacht (2011–2014), Kerry Gaelic football player
- Toiréasa Ferris, former Sinn Féin politician
- Nika Gilauri, former Prime Minister of Georgia (2009–2012)
- Pippa Hackett, former senator on the Agricultural Panel, former Minister of State at the Department of Agriculture, Food and the Marine since 2020
- Annie Hoey, former senator on the Agricultural Panel
- Sindy Joyce, Irish Traveller activist
- Brian Leddin, former TD for Limerick City
- Mary Lou McDonald, president of Sinn Féin and TD for Dublin Central
- Dan Neville, former Fine Gael politician
- Tom Neville, former Fine Gael politician
- Willie O'Dea, TD for Limerick City and former Minister for Defence
- Kieran O'Donnell, TD for Limerick City
- Diarmuid Scully, Former Mayor of Limerick
- Tomás Heneghan, activist

Religious

- Bishop Martin Hayes, BSc in Manufacturing Engineering from NIHE Limerick, Bishop of Kilmore.
- Bishop Gerard Nash, studied business in Limerick, appointed Bishop of Ferns in 2021.

Sports

- Thomas Ahern, Munster rugby player
- Jeremy Bagshaw , Olympian swimmer at the 2024 Olympics
- Thomas Barr, Olympian hurdler at the 2016 Olympics
- Rachael Blackmore, Grand National winning jockey
- Gillian Bourke, Ireland rugby player
- Enya Breen, Ireland rugby player
- Niamh Briggs, former Ireland rugby player
- Brendan Bugler, Clare hurler, Two time All-Star
- David Burke, Galway hurler, 2017 All-Ireland winning captain, Four time All-Star
- Tony Butler, Munster rugby player
- Duncan Casey, rugby player for Grenoble, formerly of Munster
- Mike Casey, Limerick hurler
- David Clifford, Kerry Gaelic football player, Three time Footballer of the Year, Six time All-Star
- Fiona Coghlan, rugby player, 2013 Women's Grand Slam and Six Nations Championship winning captain, 2013 Irish Sportswoman of the Year
- Colin Coughlan, Limerick hurler
- Martin Comerford, Kilkenny hurler, Four time All-Star
- Ailish Considine, Australian rules footballer with the Adelaide Crows
- Eimear Considine, Ireland rugby player and pundit for RTÉ
- Neil Cronin, Munster rugby player
- Patrick Cronin, Cork hurler
- Seán Cronin, Ireland and Leinster rugby player
- Sinead Diver, marathon runner represented Australia at the 2020 Tokyo Olympics
- Killian Doyle, Kilkenny hurler
- Karen Duggan, former soccer player for Ireland, currently involved with punditry for RTÉ
- Bernard Dunne, former champion boxer
- Adam English, Limerick hurler
- Darach Fahy, Galway hurler
- Seán Finn, Limerick hurler, 2019 All-Star
- Jake Flannery, Ireland, and Munster rugby player
- Jerry Flannery, , Ireland and Munster rugby player, Harlequins rugby coach
- Conor Fogarty, Kilkenny hurler
- Jason Forde, Tipperary hurler
- Anna Geary, Cork camogie player, television presenter, 2014 All-Ireland winning captain, Six time All-Star
- Gerard Hartmann, physical therapist
- Fiona Hayes, former Ireland rugby player
- Kyle Hayes, Limerick hurler, 2018 Young Hurler of the Year
- Barry Heffernan, Tipperary hurler
- Gearóid Hegarty, Limerick hurler, 2020 Hurler of the Year, Four time All-Star
- Liam Hennessy, exercise physiologist, coach and former athlete
- Séamus Hickey, Limerick hurler
- Joey Holden, Kilkenny hurler
- Tony Kelly, Clare hurler, 2013 Hurler of the Year, Five time All-Star, 2024 All-Ireland winning captain
- Dave Kilcoyne, Ireland and Munster rugby player
- Karl Lacey, Donegal gaelic footballer, 2012 Footballer of the Year, Four time All-Star
- Brian Lohan, Clare hurler, 1995 Hurler of the Year, Four time All-Star, Fitzgibbon Cup winner with UL as player (1994) and manager (2015)
- Paul Maher, Tipperary hurler
- Sharlene Mawdsley, Irish athlete specialising in the 400m
- Darragh McCarthy, Tipperary hurler
- Larry McCarthy, 40th president of the Gaelic Athletic Association
- John McGrath, Tipperary hurler, 2025 Hurler of the Year, Two time All-Star
- David McInerney, Clare hurler
- Seánie McMahon, Clare hurler, Three time All-Star
- Sinéad Millea, Kilkenny camogie player
- Jake Morris, Tipperary hurler
- Dan Morrissey, Limerick hurler
- Tom Morrissey, Limerick hurler
- Valerie Mulcahy, Cork Gaelic football player, soccer player, Six time All-Star
- Brian Mullins, Dublin Gaelic football player, Two time All-Star
- Conor Murray, Ireland, and Munster rugby player
- Richie Murray, Galway hurler
- Alan Murphy, Kilkenny hurler
- Barry Murphy, former Munster rugby player
- Gráinne Murphy, Irish Olympian
- Barry Nash, Limerick hurler
- Ciara Neville, Irish athlete specialising in the 100m and 4 × 100 m relay
- Liam O'Brien, Steeplechase Olympian at the 1984 Olympics
- Seán O'Brien, Tipperary hurler
- Tommy O'Connell, Cork hurler
- Jack O'Donoghue, Ireland and Munster rugby player
- Oisín O'Donoghue, Tipperary hurler
- William O'Donoghue, Limerick hurler
- Fiona O'Driscoll, Cork camogie and football player, 2002 Camogie Player of the Year
- Sean O'Grady, Five time Paralympic athlete
- Ronan O'Mahony, former Munster rugby player
- Cathal O'Neill, Limerick hurler
- Greg O'Shea, Ireland Sevens rugby player, winner of the fifth series of Love Island
- Eddie O'Sullivan, former Ireland rugby coach
- Chloe Pearse, Ireland rugby player
- Ciara Peelo, sailor
- Andrew Quinn, Clare hurler
- Eoin Reddan, Ireland, Wasps, and Leinster rugby player
- Julie-Ann Russell, soccer player for Ireland
- Pat Ryan, Limerick hurler
- Adam Screeney, Offaly hurler
- Laura Sheehan, Ireland rugby player
- Rhys Shelly, Tipperary hurler
- Mike Sherry, Ireland and Munster rugby player
- Ray Silke, Galway Gaelic football player, 1998 All-Ireland winning captain
- Pat Spillane, GAA commentator and former Kerry Gaelic football player, Nine time All-Star
- Damien Varley, Ireland and Munster rugby player
- Pádraig Walsh, Kilkenny hurler
- Tommy Walsh, Cork Gaelic football player
- Tony Ward, Ireland, British and Irish Lions, Munster and Leinster rugby player

== See also ==
- University of Limerick Students' Union
- Education in the Republic of Ireland
- List of universities in the Republic of Ireland
- List of public art in Limerick
