= Irish Universities Association =

Association in the Republic of Ireland

The Irish Universities’ Association (IUA) (Irish: Cumann Ollscoileanna Éireann) is the representative body of the seven universities in the Republic of Ireland and is based at the NUI offices in Merrion Square, Dublin. It is a non-profit-making body.

The IUA Council consists of the presidents/provosts of each college. IUA activities are run through a network of committees and working groups, including nine standing groups: Chief Finance Officers, VPs of Research, Registrars, HR Directors, Secretaries, VPs Global, VPs EDI, Directors of Comms & Marketing, and COOs.

In 1972, the five Heads of the universities in Ireland at that time decided to establish a conference to provide a forum for joint action on matters of common concern. The Association was created in the late 1970s as the Conference of Heads of Irish Universities (CHIU) (Irish: Comhghairm Cheannairí Ollscoileanna Éireann). It was formally incorporated in 1997 with charitable status and adopted its current name in 2005.

The IUA is a "Collective Full Member" of the European University Association.

In August 2025, former Ambassador of the United Kingdom to Ireland, Paul Johnston, was appointed Director General of the IUA.

== Members of the IUA ==
- Dublin City University
- Maynooth University
- University of Galway
- University of Dublin (Trinity College)
- University College Cork
- University College Dublin
- University of Limerick

The initial members of the CHIU were the former University Colleges of Dublin, Cork, and Galway, the then St Patrick's College, Maynooth, and Trinity College Dublin. On gaining university status, DCU and UL joined in 1990. Technological University Dublin formally joined on 1 June 2021.

== See also ==
- Open access in the Republic of Ireland
