= National Institute for Higher Education =

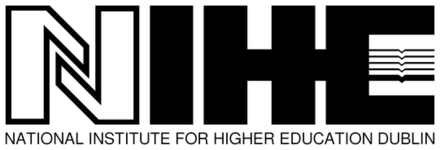

A National Institute for Higher Education (NIHE) (Irish: Foras Náisiúnta um Ard-Oideachas) was a category of higher education institution established in Ireland to provide higher level technical education above the standard of the then established Regional Technical College system, at university level. Higher level technical education in Ireland was seen to be an area that was poorly served until the advent of these institutions.

The plan was to see degree level education mainly. The first institution was set up in Limerick, where there had been long-standing demand for a university, in fact a "University of Limerick" was proposed inter alia in the late 1960s by the Lichfield Report. The institution at Dublin was to be the unified campus of what later became Dublin Institute of Technology, but instead a new institution was developed similar to Limerick.

In the 1970s it was expected that the institutions would be recognised colleges of the National University of Ireland, in time this status been raised to constituent college status. Initially this did occur for a short time (1976–1977), however the institutions had all degrees conferred by the National Council for Educational Awards after 1977, this continued until university status was achieved.

Former Institute	Current University	Announced	Opened	University Status
National Institute for Higher Education, Limerick	University of Limerick	1969	1972	1989
National Institute for Higher Education, Dublin	Dublin City University	1971	1980	1989

== International Study Group on Technological Education ==
In November 1986 the International Study Group on Technological Education was established by the Minister for Education.

The chair was T.P. Hardiman, chairman of the Investment Bank of Ireland, whilst the deputy chair was Emeritus Professor of Business Administration at University College Dublin. The other three members were:

- Vice-Chancellor of Brunel University and Vice President of the Royal Society
- President of the University of Waterloo
- Vice-President of the German Research Foundation at Hamburg University of Technology

The institutions were de facto universities from the start, and were elevated to the level of university in 1989 after the International Study Group on Technological Education presented its recommendations to the Irish Government on their status. The original brief of this report was to investigate the creation of a single National Technological University:

...to examine third-level technological education outside the universities and to consider the case of a new Technological University...

However the study group found that this title would not be appropriate considering that non-technical disciplines were offered and that one university might limit the innovation which had become the trademark of the two separate institutions:

...the NIHE Limerick having the title University of Limerick and the NIHE Dublin having the title Dublin City University or the University of Leinster.

The title 'technological university" should not be used.

== See also ==
- List of higher education institutions in the Republic of Ireland
