= Des =

Des is a masculine given name, mostly a short form (hypocorism) of Desmond. People named Des include:

== People ==
- Des Buckingham, English football manager
- Des Corcoran, (1928–2004), Australian politician
- Des Dillon (disambiguation), several people
- Des Hasler (born 1961), Australian rugby league player-coach
- Desmond Des Kelly (born 1965), British journalist
- Desmond Des Lynam (born 1942), British television presenter
- Desmond Des Lyttle (born 1971), English footballer
- Des McLean, Scottish stand-up comedian, actor and presenter
- Desmond Des O'Connor (1932–2020), British entertainer
- Des O'Connor, Australian rugby league player in the 1970s
- Desmond Des O'Grady (born 1953), Irish retired Gaelic footballer
- Des O'Hagan (1934–2015), Irish communist
- Desmond O'Malley (1939–2021), Irish politician, government minister and founder and leader of the Progressive Democrats
- Desmond Des O'Neil (1920–1999), Australian politician
- Des O'Reilly (1954–2016), Australian rugby league player
- Des Raj Goyal (1929–2013), Indian journalist, academic, and author
- Desmond Smith (general) (1911–1991), Canadian major-general
- Des Smith (headteacher), British headteacher embroiled in the Cash for Honours scandal
- Des Smith (ice hockey) (1914–1981), Canadian ice hockey defenceman
- Desmond Sinclair Des Walker (born 1965), English international footballer

== Fictional characters ==
- Desmond Des Barnes, in the British soap opera Coronation Street
- Desmond Des Clarke (Neighbours), in the Australian soap opera Neighbours
- Desmond Des Tiny, in the book series The Saga of Darren Shan

== Television ==
- Des (TV series), 2020 television series about Dennis Nilsen

== See also ==
- DES (disambiguation)
- Dess (disambiguation)
- Dez (disambiguation)
