= Desmond (name) =

- Gender: male

Origin
- Origin: anglicized Irish
- Region of origin: English-speaking world

Desmond is a given name and a surname, derived from the Irish place-name Desmond, an anglicization of the Irish Deas-Mhumhna ("South Munster"). The Irish peerages of Ormonde, Desmond, and Thomond represented the old sub-kingdoms of East, South, and North Munster, respectively. South Munster existed as an independent territory between 1118 and 1543. The title of Earl of Desmond (fourth creation) in the Peerage of Ireland originates in 1628; it is currently held by Alexander Feilding, 12th Earl of Denbigh (born 1970).

== Notable people with the given name ==
- Desmond Amofah (1990–2019), American YouTuber better known as Etika
- Desmond Arthur (1884–1913), Irish Lieutenant in the No. 2 Squadron RAF, known for being the Montrose Ghost
- Desmond Barrit (1944–2026), Welsh actor
- Desmond Claude (born 2003), American basketball player
- Desmond Connell (1926–2017), Cardinal Archbishop of Dublin
- Desmond de Silva (singer) (1944–2022), Sri Lankan musician
- Desmond Dekker (1941–2006), Jamaican singer
- Desmond Devenish, English-American filmmaker
- Desmond Devlin, American comedy writer
- Dez Dickerson (born 1955), American guitarist and singer, former member of Prince's former band The Revolution
- Desmond Digby (1933–2015), Australian set and costumer designer and illustrator
- Desmond Doss (1919–2006), first conscientious objector to receive the Medal of Honor
- Desmond Douglas (born 1955), Jamaican-born British table tennis player
- Desmond Elliot (born 1974), Nigerian actor, director and politician
- Des Ferrow (1933–2020), New Zealand cricketeer
- Desmond Fitzgerald (disambiguation), various people
- Desmond Ford (1929–2019), Christian speaker and theologian
- Desmond Green (born 1989), American mixed martial artist
- Desmond Harrington (born 1976), American actor
- Desmond Harrison (American football) (born 1993), American football player
- Desmond Haynes (born 1956), West Indian international cricketer
- Des Headland (born 1981), Australian Rules footballer
- Desmond Howard (born 1970), former National Football League player and Heisman Trophy winner
- Desmond Jennings (born 1986), American Major League Baseball player
- Des Kelly (born 1965), British journalist
- Desmond Kitchings, American football coach
- Desmond King (American football) (born 1994), American football player
- Des Lee (born 1946), Irish musician in The Miami Showband
- Desmond Lewis (1946–2018), Jamaican cricketer
- Desmond Llewelyn (1914–99), Welsh actor
- Des Lynam (born 1942), British television presenter
- Des Lyttle (born 1971), English footballer
- Desmond Mason (born 1977), American basketball player
- Desmond McKenzie (born 1952), Jamaican politician
- Desmond Morris (1928–2026), English zoologist, ethologist, surrealist painter and author (The Naked Ape)
- Desmond Muirhead (1923–2002), English-born American golf course designer
- Desmond Mullen (born 1966), American producer, director, actor, and writer
- Desmond Norman (1929–2002), English aircraft designer and businessman
- Desmond N'Ze (born 1989), Italian footballer playing in the Japanese league
- Des O'Connor (1932–2020), British entertainer
- Desmond O'Malley (1939–2021), Irish politician, government minister and founder and leader of the Progressive Democrats
- Des O'Neil (1920–1999), Australian politician
- Desmond Purnell (born 2003), American football player
- Desmond Reid (born 2004), American football player
- Desmond Rice (1924–2020), British Army officer
- Desmond Ricks, American football player
- Desmond Ridder (born 1999), American football player
- Desmond Tan (disambiguation), various people
- Desmond Trotter (born 2000), American football player
- Desmond Tutu (1931–2021), South African archbishop, civil rights activist and opponent of apartheid
- Desmond Watson (born 2003), American football player
- Desmond "Dee" Williams (born 1999), American football player

=== Stage name ===
- Desmond Child, stage name of John Charles Barrett (born 1953), American songwriter

== Notable people with the surname ==
- Casey Desmond (born 1986), American singer-songwriter
- Charles S. Desmond (1896–1987), American jurist from New York
- Connie Desmond (1908–1983), American sportscaster
- Cornelius Desmond (American politician) (1893–1974), American politician from Massachusetts
- Cornelius Desmond (Irish politician) (1898–1974), Irish politician
- Dan Desmond (1913–1964), Irish politician
- Earl D. Desmond (1895–1958), American politician from California
- Eileen Desmond (1932–2005), Irish politician
- George Henri Desmond (1874–1965), American architect
- Gerald Desmond (1915–1964), American civic leader and politician
- Humphrey J. Desmond (1858–1932), American politician, lawyer, writer, and newspaper editor from Wisconsin
- Ian Desmond (born 1985), American baseball player
- Mabel Desmond (1929–2023), American politician from Maine
- Matthew Desmond, American sociologist
- Meighan Desmond (born 1977), New Zealand actor
- Michael J. Desmond, American lawyer
- Paul Desmond (1924–1977), American jazz saxophonist
- Richard Desmond (born 1951), British publisher
- Robert Desmond (1928–2002), English actor
- Thomas C. Desmond (1887–1972), American politician from New York
- Viola Desmond (1914–1965), Canadian beautician and civil rights advocate
- Walter Desmond (1876–1951), American jurist

=== Stage name ===
- Florence Desmond, stage name of Florence Dawson (1905–1993), English actress, comedian and impersonator
- Johnny Desmond, stage name of Giovanni Alfredo De Simone (1919–1985), American singer
- Olga Desmond, pseudonym taken by Olga Sellin (1891–1964), German dancer and actress who promoted nudity on the stage
- Paul Desmond, stage name of jazz saxophonist Paul Emil Breitenfeld (1924–1977)

== Fictional characters ==
- Des Barnes, in the British soap opera Coronation Street
- Des Clarke (Neighbours), in the Australian soap opera Neighbours
- Desmond Hume in the television series Lost (2004)
- Desmond Miles in the Assassin's Creed series of video games (2007)

== See also ==
- List of Irish-language given names
- Desmon, given name
- Dez (disambiguation), sometimes a short form of Desmond (or Dezmond)
- Des, frequently a short form of Desmond
- Dessie (given name), often a short form of Desmond
