= Nado =

Nado may refer to:

== People ==
- Abel Nado (1933 or 1934 - 2024), Central African military officer and politician
- Dez Nado hip hop and reggae singer, writer and producer
- Iddy Nado (born 1995), Tanzanian football player
- Nado Makhmudov (1907–1990), Kurdish writer
- Stéphane Nado (born 1972), French football coach and player

== Other ==
- NADO, national anti-doping organisations
