= Desi (disambiguation) =

Desi or Deshi is a self-referential term used by South Asian people.

Desi or DESI may also refer to:

== People ==
- Deshi people, Indigenous Muslim community of Assam, India
- Desi Anwar (born 1962), Indonesian news presenter
- Desi Arnaz (1917–1986), Cuban-born American musician, actor, comedian and television producer
- Desi Arnaz Jr. (born 1953), American actor and musician
- Desi Banks (born 1993), American comedian and actor
- Desi Barmore (born 1960), American-Israeli basketball player
- Dési Bouterse (born 1945), president of Suriname
- Desi Curry (born 1960), Northern Irish football manager
- Desi Druschel (born 1975), American professional baseball coach
- Desi Johnson (born 2001), Australian bobsledder
- Desi Lydic (born 1981), American actress
- Desi Mokonin (born 1997), Bahraini runner
- Desi Oakley (born 1989), American singer and actress
- Desi Polanen (1913–1994), Surinamese politician and diplomat
- Desi Reijers (born 1964), Dutch swimmer
- Desi Relaford (born 1973), American baseball player
- Desi Rodriguez (born 1996), American professional basketball player
- Desi Slava (born 1979), Bulgarian singer-songwriter and producer
- Desi Washington (born 1992), American professional basketball player
- Desi Williams (born 1985), British professional rugby league footballer
- Desi Williams (Survivor contestant), American actor
- Desi Wilson (born 1969), American professional baseball player

== Science and technology ==
- Desorption electrospray ionization, an ambient ionization technique for mass spectrometry
- Drug Efficacy Study Implementation, a US FDA program
- Dark Energy Spectroscopic Instrument, an astronomical instrument
- .desi, a top-level Internet domain

== Other uses ==
- Desi, Georgia, a village in the US
- Desi (film), a 2000 Dutch documentary
- Desi, a 2002 album by British-Indian musician Panjabi MC
- Desi (raga), in Indian classical music
- Digital Economy and Society Index, a composite index in the European Union
- Dési, an alternative spelling of Déisi, a social class in early medieval Ireland

== See also ==
- Desh (disambiguation)
- Desha (disambiguation)
- Desa (disambiguation)
- DES (disambiguation)
- Uchi-deshi, or deshi, Japanese term for a live-in apprentice
