= Desmon =

Desmon is a given name. Notable people with the name include:

- Desmon Farmer (born 1981), American basketball player
- Desmon Yancy (born 1971/1972), American politician

== See also ==
- Desmon of Corinth, ancient Greek athlete
- Desmond (name), given name and surname
- Dezmon
