= Daesh (disambiguation) =

Daesh is the Arabic acronym for the Islamic State, a Salafi jihadist terrorist and militant group. It may also refer to:

- A nickname for the invasive species of blue crab Portunus segnis

== See also ==
- Daish (surname)
- Desh (disambiguation)
