= Des O'Connor (disambiguation) =

Des O'Connor (1932–2020) was an English entertainer, singer and television presenter. Des O'Connor may also refer to:

- Des O'Connor (rugby league), Australian rugby player
- Desmond O'Connor (cabaret performer)
