= Desmond Fitzgerald =

Desmond Fitzgerald or FitzGerald may refer to:

- Desmond FitzGerald, 28th Knight of Glin (1901–1949), Anglo-Irish nobleman
- Desmond FitzGerald, 29th Knight of Glin (1937–2011), Irish author
- Desmond FitzGerald (politician) (1888–1947), Irish revolutionary and politician
- Desmond FitzGerald (CIA officer) (1910–1967), American espionage officer
- Desmond FitzGerald (architect) (1911–1987), Irish architect
- Desmond Fitzgerald (professor) (born 1953), president of the University of Limerick
- Desmond G. Fitzgerald (1834–1905), English electrician and spiritualist
