= DESI =

DESI may refer to

- Desorption electrospray ionization
- Drug Efficacy Study Implementation
- Dark Energy Spectroscopic Instrument

== See also ==
- Desi (disambiguation)
