= Demond =

- Pronunciation: /dɪˈmʌnd/
- Gender: Male
- Language: English

Origin
- Language: English
- Origin: Possibly a variant of Desmond
- Derivation: Desmond or phonetic innovation
- Meaning: Possibly "from South Munster" (if derived from Desmond)
- Region of origin: United States

Other names
- Related names: Desmond, Damon, Deon
- Popularity: see popular names

Demond or DeMond is a masculine given name and a surname primarily used in the United States. Though sometimes considered a modern or phonetic variation of the name Desmond, Demond has developed distinct usage and cultural associations, particularly within African-American communities.

The name gained moderate popularity in the United States during the 1970s and 1980s, possibly influenced by public figures bearing the name. Unlike many traditional names, Demond does not have widespread historical or linguistic roots beyond its modern usage.

== People ==
=== Given name ===
- Demond Tweety Carter (born 1986), American basketball coach and former player
- Demond Claiborne (born 2003), American college football player
- Demond Greene (born 1979), German-American basketball coach and former player
- Demond Brent Leggs (born 1972), African-American architectural historian and preservationist
- Demond Mallet (born 1978), American basketball player
- Demond Meeks (born 1979), American union organizer and politician
- Demond Price (born 1982), stage name Conway the Machine, American rapper and record label co-founder
- Demond Bob Sanders (born 1981), American former National Football League player
- Demond Washington (born 1987), American former football player
- Demond Williams Jr. (born 2006), American football quarterback
- Demond Wilson (1946–2026), American actor and minister
- DeMond Winston (born 1968), American former National Football League player

=== Surname ===
- Abraham Lincoln DeMond (1867–1936), African-American minister and advocate for African-American emancipation
- Albert DeMond (1901–1973), American screenwriter

== Fictional characters ==
- Demond, a Black superhero

== See also ==
- Desmond (name)
- African-American names
- Damon (given name)
- Deon
