= Desis =

Desis may refer to:

- Desi, referring to the Indian subcontinent or South Asia
- One of a type of List of surgical procedures (such as Arthrodesis, Epiphysiodesis, Pleurodesis)
- Desis (spider), a genus of intertidal spiders

== See also ==
- Desi (disambiguation)
