= Leslie Hairston =

American politician (born 1961)

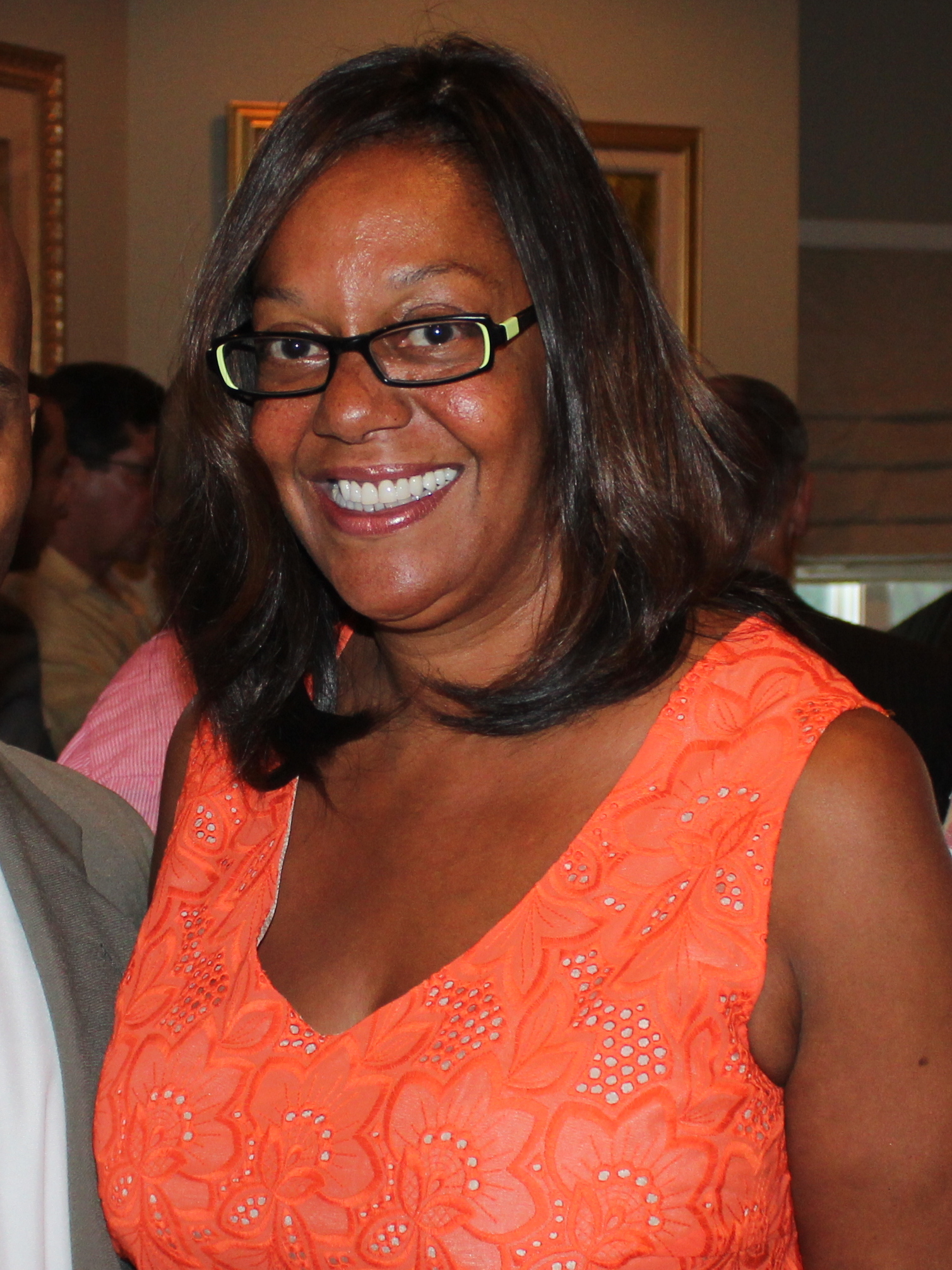
- Hairston in 2012

Member of the Chicago City Council from the 5th ward
- In office May 1999 – May 15, 2023
- Preceded by: Barbara Holt
- Succeeded by: Desmon Yancy

Personal details
- Born: July 17, 1961 (age 65) Chicago, Illinois, U.S.
- Party: Democratic
- Education: University of Wisconsin, Madison (BA); Loyola University Chicago (JD)

Leslie Hairston (born July 17, 1961) is an American politician who previously served as alderperson of the 5th ward of the City of Chicago from her first election in 1999 until retiring in 2023. Hairston is a Hyde Park native. As alderman, she represented the ward in the Chicago City Council along with representatives from the 49 other Chicago wards. She was re-elected in 2003, 2007, 2011, 2015 and 2019.

== Early life ==
Hairston was born in Chicago and grew up in the Hyde Park and South Shore neighborhoods. She is an alumna of the University of Chicago Lab Schools. Hariston earned her bachelor's degree from the University of Wisconsin, and her J.D. degree from Loyola University School of Law. Before becoming alderman, Hairston was in a private law practice.

== Public service ==
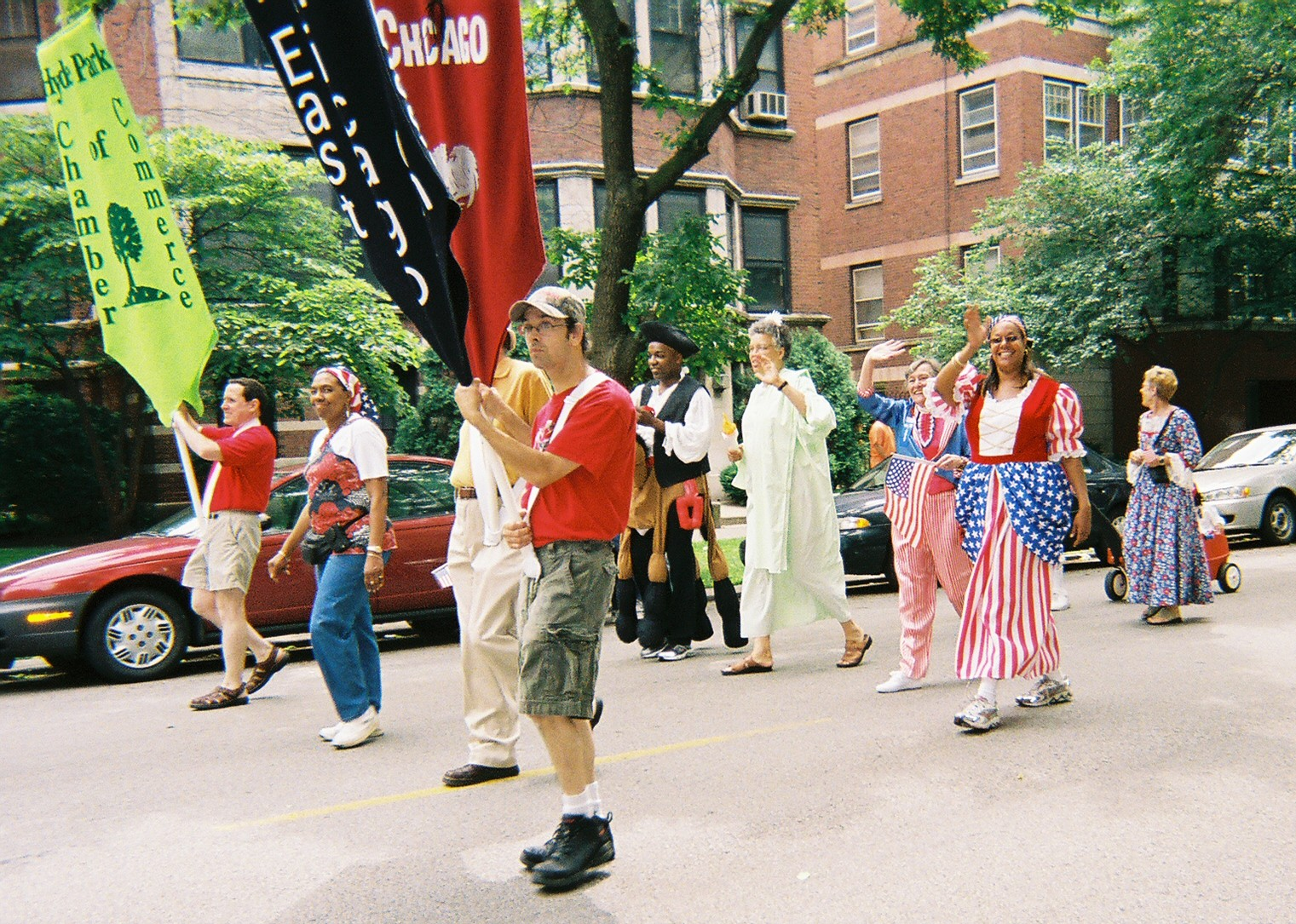
Hyde Park 2006 Independence Day parade (left to right starting at center in light green): Chicago City Council Alderman Toni Preckwinkle as the Statue of Liberty, Illinois State Representative Barbara Flynn Currie as Uncle Sam, and Hairston as Betsy Ross

Hairston worked in Springfield as an Assistant Attorney General. She also handled litigation for the office of the Illinois Attorney's Appellate Prosecutor's Office, where she argued before the Illinois Supreme Court. She is a member of the South Shore Cultural Center Advisory Council, the Jackson Park Advisory Council, and the O'Keeffe Area Council. She was a member of the McFarland Mental Health Center with the Illinois Department of Mental Health and Development Disabilities and a former beat facilitator for CAPS. Hairston is also a member of Alpha Kappa Alpha sorority.

== Aldermanic career ==
Hairston was elected in 1999, when she defeated an incumbent in her first race. She sat on five committees: Buildings; Rules and Ethics; Human Relations; Parks and Recreation; and Special Events and Cultural Affairs. Between January 2008 and July 2009, Hairston hired Chicago political consultant Delmarie Cobb to prepare newsletters and news releases and to publicize ward meetings for the alderman, and paid Cobb thousands of dollars from Hairston's campaign fund, as well as nearly $28,000 from a taxpayer-funded payroll account, available to aldermen with no scrutiny.

Hairston was one of only five Chicago aldermen to oppose the privatization of Chicago parking meters.

Hairston was a member of the Council's Progressive Reform Caucus.

In the 2019 Chicago mayoral election, Hairston endorsed Toni Preckwinkle, declaring her support for her in advance of the first round of the election upon Preckwinkle's entrance into the mayoral race.

On August 26, 2022, Hairston announced that she would not run for re-election in the 2023 election, retiring at the end of her term.
