= Harry P. Beam =

American politician

Member of the U.S. House of Representatives from Illinois's 4th district
- In office March 4, 1931 – December 6, 1942
- Preceded by: Thomas A. Doyle
- Succeeded by: Martin Gorski

Judge of the Municipal Court of Chicago
- In office 1942–1964

Personal details
- Born: November 23, 1892 Peoria, Illinois, U.S.
- Died: December 31, 1967 (aged 75) Chicago, Illinois, U.S.
- Resting place: Holy Sepulchre Cemetery
- Party: Democratic

Harry Peter Beam (November 23, 1892 – December 31, 1967) was an American politician who served as a U.S. representative from Illinois from 1931 to 1942.

== Early life and career ==
Born in Peoria, Illinois, Beam moved with his parents to Chicago, Illinois, in 1899. He attended St. Mary's School, Marshalltown, Iowa, and Holy Family School, Chicago, Illinois, was graduated from St. Ignatius College (now known as Loyola University Chicago), in 1912 and from Loyola University Chicago School of Law, in 1916. He was admitted to the bar the same year and commenced practice in Chicago, Illinois. During the First World War served as a seaman, first class, in the United States Navy from May 1918 to December 1918. He served as assistant corporation counsel of Chicago 1923–1927.

In 1923, Beam was an unsuccessful Democratic nominee for the Superior Court of Cook County.

== United States House of Representatives ==
Beam was elected as a Democrat to the Seventy-second and to the five succeeding Congresses and served from March 4, 1931, until his resignation on December 6, 1942. He served as chairman of the Committee on Memorials (Seventy-seventh Congress).

== Municipal Court of Chicago ==
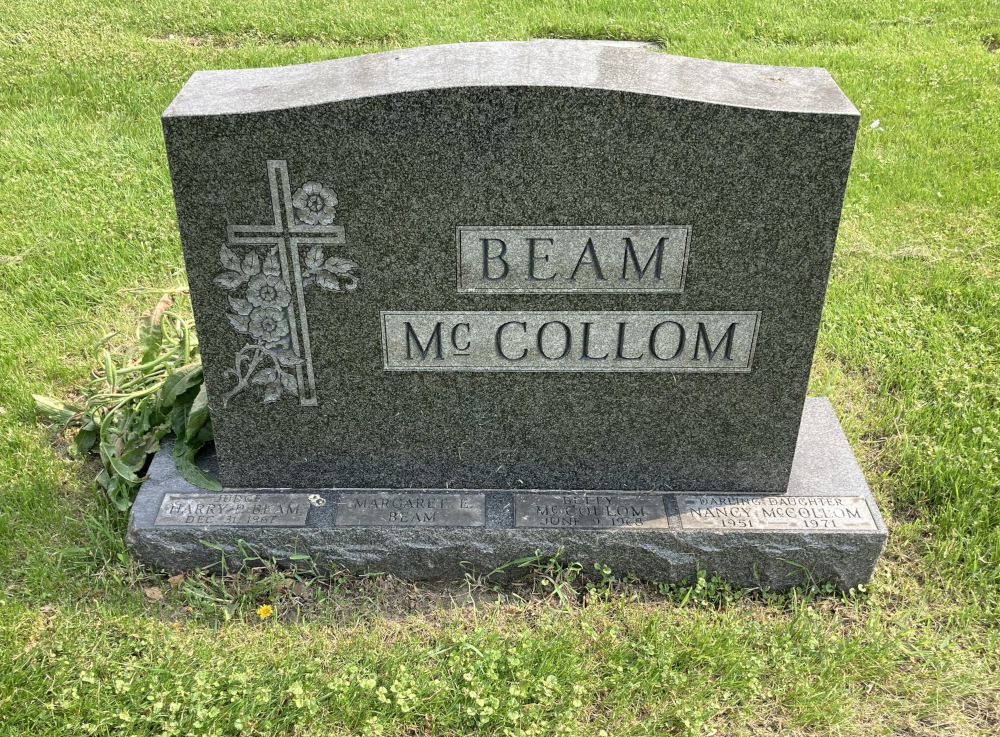
Beam's grave at Holy Sepulchre Cemetery

Beam was elected as a judge of the Municipal Court of Chicago in 1942, and was reelected in 1948, 1954, and 1960. He engaged in legal practice and retired in 1964.

== Personal life ==
Beam was a resident of Chicago, Illinois, until his death there on December 31, 1967. He was interred in Holy Sepulchre Cemetery in Alsip.

== See also ==
- List of members of the House Un-American Activities Committee

U.S. House of Representatives
Preceded by Thomas A. Doyle	Member of the U.S. House of Representatives from Illinois's 4th congressional district March 4, 1931 - December 6, 1942	Succeeded by Martin Gorski
