= John W. Rainey =

American politician (1880-1923)

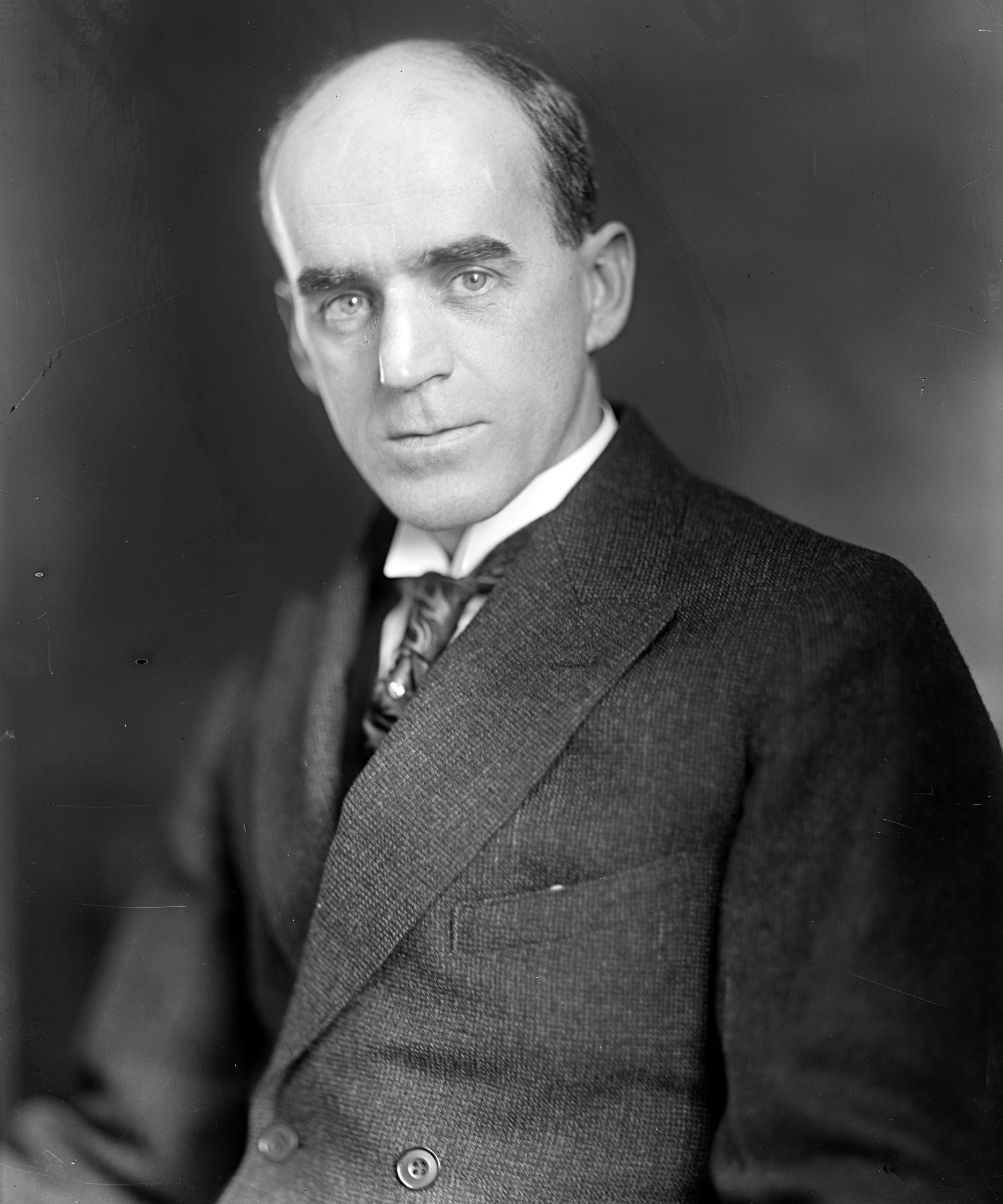

Member of the U.S. House of Representatives from Illinois's 4th district
- In office April 2, 1918 – May 4, 1923
- Preceded by: Charles Martin
- Succeeded by: Thomas A. Doyle

Personal details
- Born: December 21, 1880 Chicago, Illinois, U.S.
- Died: May 4, 1923 (aged 42) Chicago, Illinois, U.S.
- Resting place: Calvary Cemetery
- Party: Democratic

John William Rainey (December 21, 1880 – May 4, 1923) was a U.S. representative from Illinois.

== Biography ==
Born in Chicago, Illinois, Rainey attended the public schools of his native city, De La Salle Institute, and the Kent College of Law. He was admitted to the bar in 1910 and commenced the practice of law in Chicago. Rainey served as assistant judge of the probate court of Cook County 1910–1912, and served as clerk of the circuit court 1912–1916.

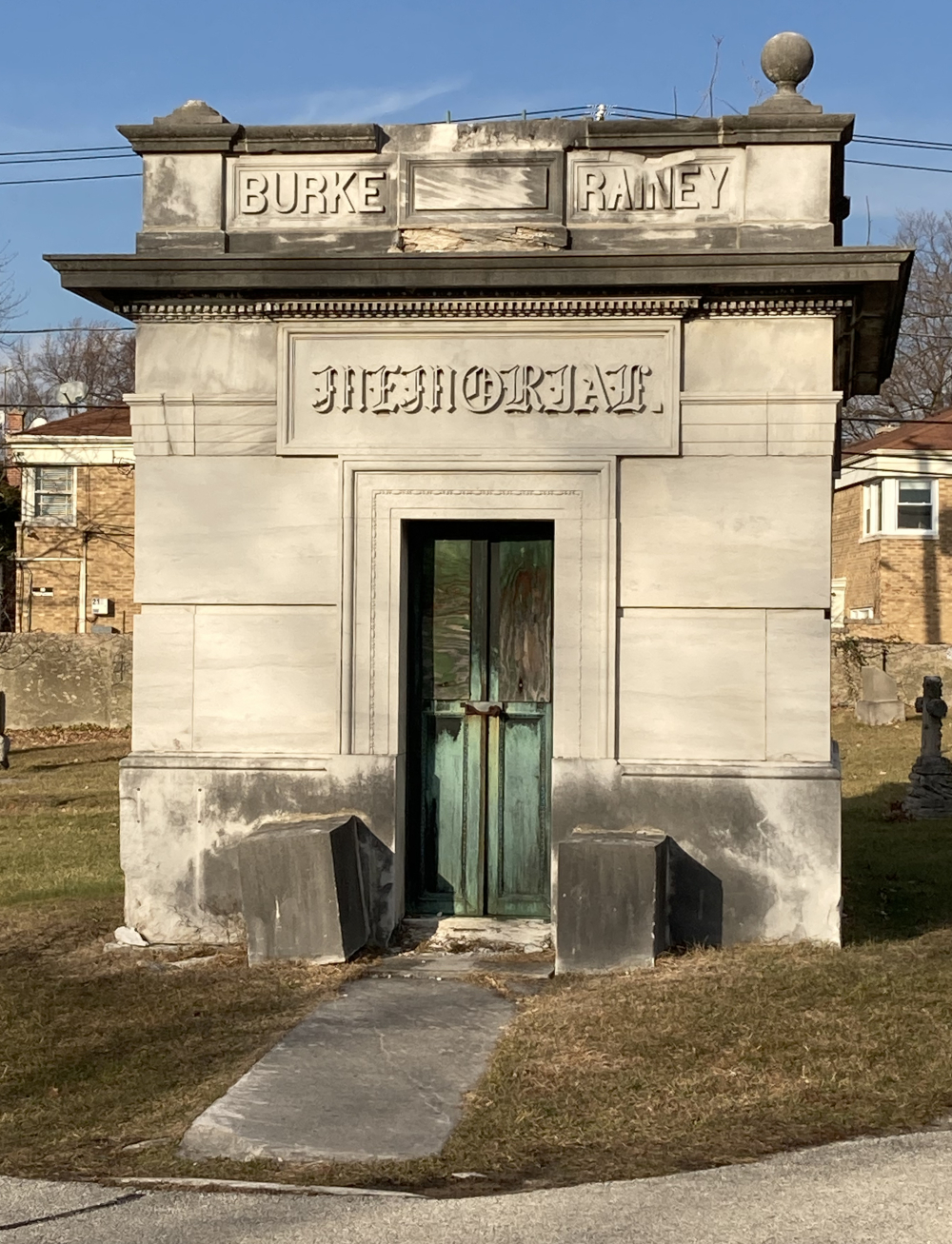
Mausoleum at Calvary Cemetery

Rainey was elected as a Democrat to the Sixty-fifth Congress to fill the vacancy caused by the death of Charles Martin. He was reelected to the Sixty-sixth, Sixty-seventh, and Sixty-eighth Congresses and served from April 2, 1918, until his death in Chicago, Illinois, on May 4, 1923. Rainey was interred in Calvary Cemetery in Evanston.

== See also ==
- List of members of the United States Congress who died in office (1900–1949)

U.S. House of Representatives
Preceded by Charles Martin	Member of the U.S. House of Representatives from Illinois's 4th congressional district April 2, 1918 - May 4, 1923	Succeeded by Thomas A. Doyle
