= Desh =

Desh may refer to:

== Arts ==
- Desh (raga), an Indian classical music scale (raga in both Hindustani music and Carnatic music)

== Media ==
- Desh (magazine), an Indian Bengali-language magazine
- Desh TV, a Bangladeshi TV channel
- Desh (film), a 2002 Indian Bengali-language film by Raja Sen
- Desh Bouksani, the name of a rival assassin in the 2007 film The Bourne Ultimatum, directed by Paul Greengrass

== Places ==
- -desh, an Indo-Aryan word for "country", which appears in the names of many places
- Desh, Maharashtra, a place in India

== See also ==
- Desha (disambiguation)
- Desa (disambiguation)
- DES (disambiguation)
- Daesh (disambiguation)
- Desi (disambiguation)
- Pradesh
