= Pradesh =

Province or territory in various languages

"Pradesh" refers to a province or territory in various South Asian languages. It derives from the Sanskrit प्रदेश (pradeśa), meaning "sub-region" or "sub-country". The word was borrowed into other languages to signify "nation" or "country":

- Thai: ประเทศ, prathet
- Lao: ປະເທດ, pathet
- Khmer: ប្រទេស, prâtés

== States of India ==
The official names of five Indian states and one former state bear the word pradesh:

- Andhra Pradesh, Land of the Andhras
- Arunachal Pradesh, Aruna/Arunachal = Land of the Rising Sun or Land of the dawn-lit mountains
- Himachal Pradesh, Hima/Himachal = Land of the Snow
- Madhya Pradesh, Central Province, replacing the former Central Provinces and Berar which was later renamed as Madhya Bharat
- Uttar Pradesh, Northern Province, although not the north-most province; it was formerly the United Provinces of Agra and Oudh which was later renamed as United Provinces
- Vindhya Pradesh, Land of the Vindhya, former state merged into Madhya Pradesh in 1956

== Provinces of Nepal ==
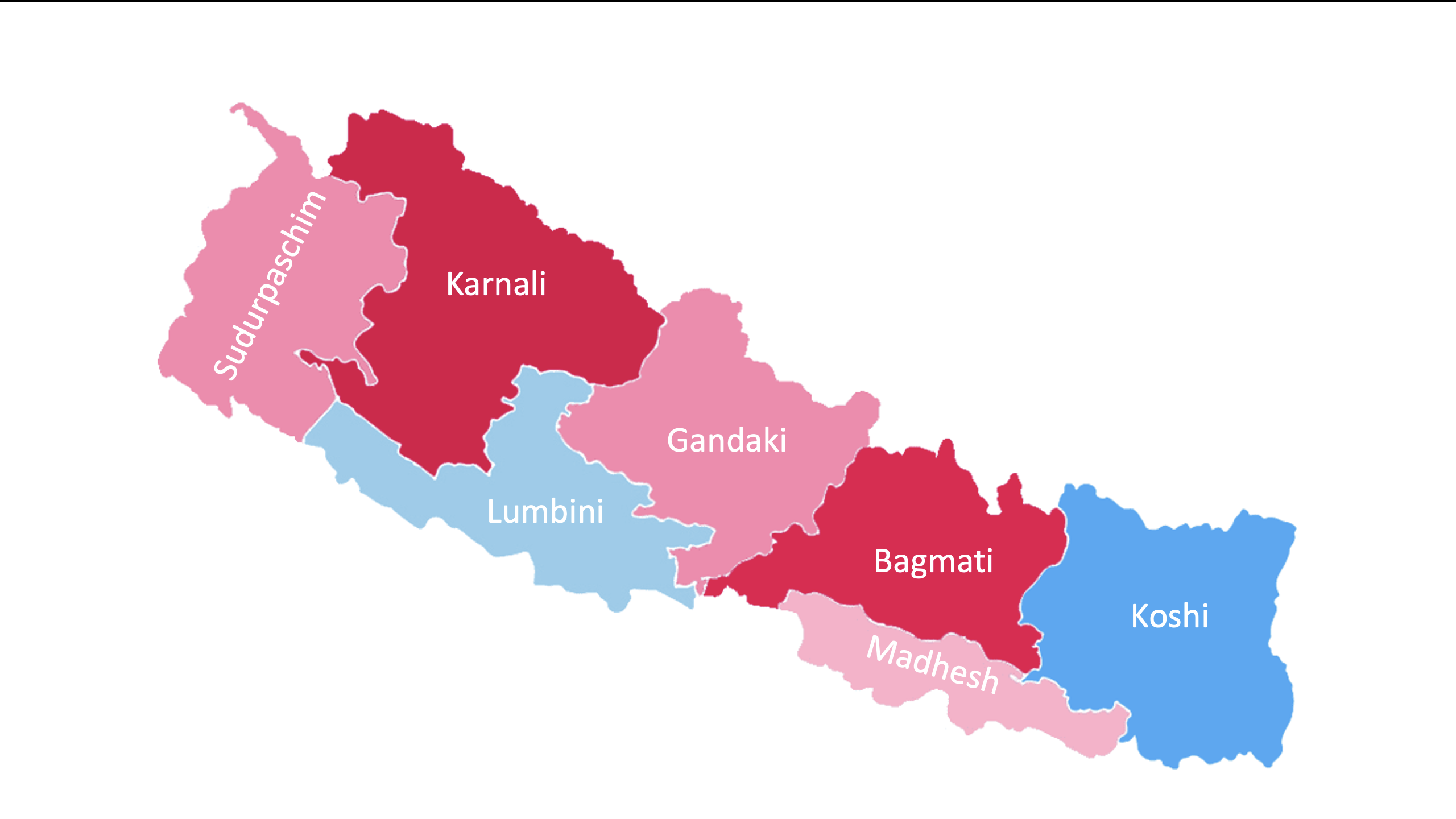
Provinces of Nepal

- Bagmati Pradesh, land of the Bagmati River
- Gandaki Pradesh, land of the Gandaki River
- Karnali Pradesh, land of the Karnali River
- Koshi Pradesh, land of the Koshi River
- Lumbini Pradesh, land of the Lumbini pilgrimage
- Madhesh Pradesh, land of the central region
- Sudurpashchim Pradesh, land of the far western region

== See also ==
- Desh (disambiguation)
- Desi
- -stan
- Parish
- Pradesh Congress Committee
- Pradeshiya Sabha
