= DES =

DES or Des may refer to:

== Computing ==
- Data Encryption Standard, a block cipher that is no longer secure for today's standards
- DirectShow Editing Services, an Application Programming Interface
- Discrete event simulation, a kind of scientific modelling

== Education ==
- Deccan Education Society, a private education institution based in Pune, India.
- Department of Education and Science (UK), the former name of the Department for Education and Skills
- Diplôme d'études supérieures, a former degree used in France and French-speaking countries

== Medical ==
- Diethylstilbestrol, a synthetic estrogen and the origin of the phrase "DES daughter"
- DES gene, which encodes the desmin protein
- Diffuse esophageal spasm, a disorder of the esophagus
- Dissociative Experiences Scale, a questionnaire to screen for dissociative identity disorder
- Drug-eluting stent, a medical device
- Dry eye syndrome, also known as keratoconjunctivitis sicca
- Dysequilibrium syndrome, a congenital disorder of the nervous system

== Other uses ==
- Dar es Salaam
- Dark Energy Survey, an astronomy project
- Disability Employment Services, a former welfare program of Department of Social Services in Australia, renamed as Inclusive Employment Australia
- Deep Ecliptic Survey, an astronomy project
- Deep eutectic solvent, an ionic solvent
- Defence Equipment and Support, British MOD's defence procurement arm
- Delivered Ex Ship, an international sales term
- Detached eddy simulation, a model in fluid dynamics
- Des, a three-part British series about serial killer Dennis Nilsen
- Desroches Airport, by IATA code
- Arizona Department of Economic Security, a US government organization providing a variety of social support services to Arizona residents
- Desmond (name), a male given name in shortened form
- Desiree (given name), a female given name in shortened form
- Diethyl sulfate, an organic chemical

== See also ==
- Desh (disambiguation)
- Desi (disambiguation)
- Bachelor of Design (B.Des), an academic degree
