= 5th ward, Chicago =

Ward in Chicago

5th Ward - Chicago
- Ward
- Ward 5
- Current Chicago ward map, with 5th ward highlighted in red
- Country: United States
- State: Illinois
- County: Cook
- City: Chicago
- Established: 1837
- Communities: list

Government
  - Type: Ward
  - Body: Chicago City Council
  - Alderperson: Desmon Yancy (Democratic Party)

The 5th Ward is one of the 50 aldermanic wards with representation in the City Council of Chicago, Illinois.

== Past alders ==
The current alderperson for the 5th ward is Desmon Yancy.

=== Before 1923 ===
Before 1923, wards were represented by two aldermen.

Aldermen					# Council	Aldermen				
Alderman	Term in office	Party	Notes	Cite	# Council	Alderman	Term in office	Party	Notes	Cite
Francis C. Taylor	1837–1838				1st	—N/a				
Henry L. Rucker	1838–1842		Later elected alderman again in 1849 in 2nd ward		2nd	—N/a				
Henry L. Rucker	1838–1842		Later elected alderman again in 1849 in 2nd ward		3rd	John C. Wilson	1839–1840			
Henry L. Rucker	1838–1842		Later elected alderman again in 1849 in 2nd ward		4th	William Allen	1840–1841			
Henry L. Rucker	1838–1842		Later elected alderman again in 1849 in 2nd ward		5th	Samuel Grier	1841–1842			
George Brady	1842–1843		Later elected alderman again in 1849 in 7th ward		6th	Edward Carroll	1842–1843			
John Curver	1843–1844				7th	Samuel Grier	1843–1844			
Thomas Brown	1844–1845				8th	Patrik Kain	1844–1845			
Elihu Granger	1845–1847		Redistricted to 7th ward in 1847		9th	Samuel Grier	1845–1847			
Elihu Granger	1845–1847		Redistricted to 7th ward in 1847		10th	Samuel Grier	1845–1847			
Thomas James	1847–1849				11th	John Sheriffs	1847–1848			
Thomas James	1847–1849				12th	John Charles Haines	1848–1854			
E.H. Chapin	1849				13th	John Charles Haines	1848–1854			
Alson S. Sherman	1849–1851		Previously served in 3rd ward		13th	John Charles Haines	1848–1854			
Alson S. Sherman	1849–1851		Previously served in 3rd ward		14th	John Charles Haines	1848–1854			
J.L. James	1851–1853				15th	John Charles Haines	1848–1854			
J.L. James	1851–1853				16th	John Charles Haines	1848–1854			
William H. Scoville	1853–1855				17th	John Charles Haines	1848–1854			
William H. Scoville	1853–1855				18th	Jasper D. Ward	1854–1856			
Charles N. Holden	1855–1857				19th	Jasper D. Ward	1854–1856			
Charles N. Holden	1855–1857				20th	Russell Green	1856–1858			
Artimas Carter	1857–1859				21st	Russell Green	1856–1858			
Artimas Carter	1857–1859				22nd	Jasper D. Ward	1858–1860			
L.B. Taft	1959–1861				23rd	Jasper D. Ward	1858–1860			
L.B. Taft	1959–1861				24th	Robert H. Foss	1860–1862	Republican	Previously served as alderman from the 4th ward (1847–1852; 1854–55); died in office	
Charles C. P. Holden	1861–1863	Republican	Redistricted to 10th ward in 1863		25th	Robert H. Foss	1860–1862	Republican	Previously served as alderman from the 4th ward (1847–1852; 1854–55); died in office	
Charles C. P. Holden	1861–1863	Republican	Redistricted to 10th ward in 1863		26th	William A. Groves	1862–1863			
Mark Sheridan	1863–1866				27th	Constantine Kann	1863–1867			
Mark Sheridan	1863–1866				28th	Constantine Kann	1863–1867			
Mark Sheridan	1863–1866				29th	Constantine Kann	1863–1867			
M. Finucan	1866–1867				30th	Constantine Kann	1863–1867			
M. Finucan	1866–1867				31st	John Raber	1867–1869			
Mark Sheridan	1868–1869		Redistricted to 6th ward in 1869		32nd	John Raber	1867–1869			
Mark Sheridan	1868–1869		Redistricted to 6th ward in 1869		33rd	John Raber	1867–1869			
Peter Daggy	1869–1872				34th	George S. Whitaker	1869–1871			
Peter Daggy	1869–1872				35th	George S. Whitaker	1869–1871			
Peter Daggy	1869–1872				36th	R. B. Stone	1871–1876			
Aquilla H. Pickering	1872–1874				37th	R. B. Stone	1871–1876			
Aquilla H. Pickering	1872–1874				38th	R. B. Stone	1871–1876			
Thomas C. Clarke	1874–1876	Republican	Later elected alderman again in 1884 in 4th ward		39th	R. B. Stone	1871–1876			
Fred Sommer	1876–1878		Redistricted from 6th ward		40th	Mark Sheridan	1876–1877		Previously served in 6th and 5th wards	
Fred Sommer	1876–1878		Redistricted from 6th ward		41st	John D. Tully	1877–1879			
George Turner	1878–1880				42nd	John D. Tully	1877–1879			
George Turner	1878–1880				43rd	Michael McAuley	1879–1881	Democratic		
Edward P. Burke	1880–1886	Democratic	Later elected alderman again in 1888 in 6th ward		44th	Michael McAuley	1879–1881	Democratic		
Edward P. Burke	1880–1886	Democratic	Later elected alderman again in 1888 in 6th ward		45th	Henry F. Sheridan	1881–1887	Democratic		
Edward P. Burke	1880–1886	Democratic	Later elected alderman again in 1888 in 6th ward		46th	Henry F. Sheridan	1881–1887	Democratic		
Edward P. Burke	1880–1886	Democratic	Later elected alderman again in 1888 in 6th ward		47th	Henry F. Sheridan	1881–1887	Democratic		
Edward P. Burke	1880–1886	Democratic	Later elected alderman again in 1888 in 6th ward		48th	Henry F. Sheridan	1881–1887	Democratic		
Edward P. Burke	1880–1886	Democratic	Later elected alderman again in 1888 in 6th ward		49th	Henry F. Sheridan	1881–1887	Democratic		
Charles Hillcock	1886–1888	Independent			50th	Henry F. Sheridan	1881–1887	Democratic		
Charles Hillcock	1886–1888	Independent			51st	Edward D. Connor	1887–1889			
John S. Oehmen	1888–1890				52nd	Edward D. Connor	1887–1889			
John S. Oehmen	1888–1890				53rd	Timothy C. Hickey	1889–1991			
Charles Duer	1890–1892				54th	Timothy C. Hickey	1889–1991			
Charles Duer	1890–1892				55th	Patrick J. Wall	1891–1895			
John Voght	1892–1894	Republican			56th	Patrick J. Wall	1891–1895			
John Voght	1892–1894	Republican			57th	Patrick J. Wall	1891–1895			
David Deist	1894–1896	Democratic			58th	Patrick J. Wall	1891–1895			
David Deist	1894–1896	Democratic			59th	William J. Doerr	1895–1897			
William E. Kent	1896–1898				60th	William J. Doerr	1895–1897			
William E. Kent	1896–1898				61st	Frank X. Cloidt	1897–1899			
Edward D. Connor	1898–1900				62nd	Frank X. Cloidt	1897–1899			
Edward D. Connor	1898–1900				63rd	Michael M. Blake	1899–1901			
William E. Kent	1900–1901		Redistricted to 4th ward in 1901		64th	Michael M. Blake	1899–1901			
Charles Martin	1901–1902	Democratic	Redistricted from 6th ward		65th	Edward Litzinger	1901–1903			
Robert K. Sloan	1902–1904				66th	Edward Litzinger	1901–1903			
Robert K. Sloan	1902–1904				67th	Thomas Rooney	1903–1905			
James J. McCormick	1904–1908		Previously served in 6th ward		68th	Thomas Rooney	1903–1905			
James J. McCormick	1904–1908		Previously served in 6th ward		69th	Charles Martin	1905–1907	Democratic	Previously served in 5th and 6th wards	
James J. McCormick	1904–1908		Previously served in 6th ward		70th	Charles Martin	1905–1907	Democratic	Previously served in 5th and 6th wards	
James J. McCormick	1904–1908		Previously served in 6th ward		71st	Alex J. Burke	1907–1911			
William J. McKenna	1908–1910				72nd	Alex J. Burke	1907–1911			
William J. McKenna	1908–1910				73rd	Alex J. Burke	1907–1911			
Charles Martin	1910–1914	Democratic	Previously serve in 5th and 6th wards		74th	Alex J. Burke	1907–1911			
Charles Martin	1910–1914	Democratic	Previously serve in 5th and 6th wards		75th	Patrick J. Carr	1911–1914			
Charles Martin	1910–1914	Democratic	Previously serve in 5th and 6th wards		76th	Patrick J. Carr	1911–1914			
Charles Martin	1910–1914	Democratic	Previously serve in 5th and 6th wards		77th	Patrick J. Carr	1911–1914			
Thomas A. Doyle	1914–1918	Democratic	Later elected an alderman again in 1931		78th	Patrick J. Carr	1911–1914			
Thomas A. Doyle	1914–1918	Democratic	Later elected an alderman again in 1931		79th	Charles Martin	1915–1917	Democratic	Previously served in 5th and 6th wards	
Thomas A. Doyle	1914–1918	Democratic	Later elected an alderman again in 1931		80th	Charles Martin	1915–1917	Democratic	Previously served in 5th and 6th wards	
Thomas A. Doyle	1914–1918	Democratic	Later elected an alderman again in 1931		81st	Joseph B. McDonough	1917–1923	Democratic	Continued as alderman after 1923; redistricted to 13th ward	
Robert J. Mulcahy	1918–1923		Democratic		82nd	Joseph B. McDonough	1917–1923	Democratic	Continued as alderman after 1923; redistricted to 13th ward	
Robert J. Mulcahy	1918–1923		Democratic		83rd	Joseph B. McDonough	1917–1923	Democratic	Continued as alderman after 1923; redistricted to 13th ward	
Robert J. Mulcahy	1918–1923		Democratic		84th	Joseph B. McDonough	1917–1923	Democratic	Continued as alderman after 1923; redistricted to 13th ward	
Robert J. Mulcahy	1918–1923		Democratic		85th	Joseph B. McDonough	1917–1923	Democratic	Continued as alderman after 1923; redistricted to 13th ward	
Robert J. Mulcahy	1918–1923		Democratic		86th	Joseph B. McDonough	1917–1923	Democratic	Continued as alderman after 1923; redistricted to 13th ward	

=== Since 1923 ===
Since 1923, wards have been represented by a single alderman. Elections have also been nonpartisan, though officeholders often still publicly affiliate with parties.

Alderperson	Term in office	Party	Notes	Cite
Charles S. Eaton	1923–1927	Republican	redistricted from 6th ward in 1923; served again beginning in 1929	
Leonard J. Grossman	1927–1929			
Charles S. Eaton	1929–1931	Republican	previously served in 5th and 6th wards	
Irving J. Schreiber	1931–1933			
James J. Cusack Jr.	1933–1937	Democratic		
Paul Douglas	1939–1942	Democratic	Resigned to join the United States Armed Forces	
Bertram B. Moss	1943–1947			
Robert E. Merriam	1947–1955	Republican		
Leon Despres	1955–1975	Democratic		
Ross Lathrop	1975–79	Independent		
Lawrence Bloom	1979–1995	Independent Democrat		
Barbara Holt	1995–1999			
Leslie Hairston	1995–2023	Democratic		
Desmon Yancy	2023–present	Democratic		
