= Daish (surname) =

Daish is a surname. Notable people with the surname include:

- Andrew Daish (born 1984), Welsh-born Swedish rugby union footballer
- Ella Daish, British environmental activist
- Jake Barker-Daish (born 1993), Australian soccer player
- Liam Daish (born 1968), English-born Irish footballer
