= Desha =

Desha may refer to:

== People ==
- Benjamin Desha, American soldier and politician
- Joseph Desha (1768–1842), US Representative and the ninth governor of Kentucky
- Lucius Desha Bunton III (1924–2001), US federal judge
- Robert Desha, American politician who represented Tennessee's 5th Congressional district in the US House of Representatives
- Desha Breckinridge (1867–1935), American newspaper editor and publisher
- Desha Delteil (1892–1965), American dancer and artist model

== Places ==
- Desha County, Arkansas, United States
- Desh region, or Desha, in Maharashtra, India

== Other uses ==
- Desha: The Leader, a 2014 Bangladeshi film, directed by Saikat Nasir

== Other ==
- Desa (disambiguation)
- Desh (disambiguation)
- Desi (disambiguation)
- Desha Putra Sammanaya, Sri Lankan military decoration
- Desha Vimukthi Janatha Pakshaya, political party in Sri Lanka
- Payne-Desha House, a historic house near downtown Georgetown, Kentucky, US
