= The Busy Little Engine =

2005 film by Desmond Mullen

- DVD cover image
- Directed by: Desmond Mullen
- Written by: Desmond Mullen
- Produced by: Desmond Mullen; Helena Mullen
- Starring: Desmond Mullen; Lorrie Guess
- Narrated by: Desmond Mullen
- Cinematography: Desmond Mullen
- Edited by: Desmond Mullen
- Music by: Jimmy Magoo
- Distributed by: Squirrel Tracks
- Release date: December 12, 2005
- Running time: 34 minutes
- Country: United States
- Language: English
- Budget: $52,000 (est.)

The Busy Little Engine is a 2005 American animated adventure short film written and directed by Desmond Mullen. It was selected for the 2006 San Diego International Children's Film Festival and reviewed in the professional library journals Booklist, School Library Journal, and Video Librarian. The Busy Little Engine was picked Best DVD by Parenting Magazine in July 2006.

The film takes place in the fictional city of Dinkytown and tells the story of Busy Little Engine, a wooden toy train who pretends to deliver raw materials to a cookie factory. He appears as a wooden toy train in a playroom and as a full-scale CGI train inserted into real-world backgrounds in different parts of the film.

== Plot ==
The film starts off with Busy Little Engine going back and forth through a railroad crossing because he does not know what real trains do. This prompts Pig to ask what trains do, and the narrator explains that trains have a variety of purposes by showcasing different types of railroad cars. In this segment, Pig asks if flatcars carry individual cookies. The narrator explains to Pig that cookies are boxed and carried in boxcars from factories to stores. After explaining to Pig what factories are and how materials from farms go to factories, Pig suggests the idea of going to a farm. This leads the narrator to expand on Pig's idea and suggest that Busy Little Engine pretends to take raw materials from a farm and transport them to a factory. Busy Little Engine obliges. After Busy Little Engine enters a tunnel, the style changes to CGI when he comes out. It can be inferred that this part of the film is in the characters' imaginations.

When Busy Little Engine comes out of the tunnel, he is shown to move through various places, like over a bridge and through a city. When Busy Little Engine arrives at the farm to pick up sugar, Pig and the narrator go to look at farm animals.

After Busy Little Engine is done filling up with sugar, he heads for the flour silo. Instead of showing Busy Little Engine's journey, a montage of American road signs warning of animal crossings plays, with Pig commenting on each one.

When Busy Little Engine arrives at the flour silos, Pig asks why Busy Little Engine doesn't go to a backyard to get flowers. The narrator then explains the difference between flowers and flour to Pig, since they sound alike.

Busy Little Engine leaves the flour silos and goes immediately to the dairy farm to pick up butter. The narrator explains to Pig, after he asks if Busy Little Engine is going to the grocery store, that they are picking up butter in bulk, along with explaining how butter is made. When Busy Little Engine is done loading butter, they head back to the cookie factory in the playroom, transitioning between real-life scenes like in the beginning of the movie.

As Busy Little Engine is heading back, a large train approaches towards him on the same track. The narrator places emphasis on how a railroad switch needs to be flipped in order to let the opposing train pass.

After Busy Little Engine comes out of the tunnel, he pulls into the imaginary cookie factory and pretends to have the ingredients he collected unloaded.

== Production ==
The real-world portions of the film were filmed in Durham and Chapel Hill, North Carolina.

== Cast ==
- Desmond Mullen as Busy Little Engine, the Narrator, and Pig
- Lorrie Guess as the Prologue

== Reception ==
The Busy Little Engine was selected for the 2006 San Diego International Children's Film Festival. It was picked Best DVD by Parenting Magazine in July 2006.

Inspired in part by Richard Scarry's book, What do People do All Day? and other children's picture books, the DVD uses static framing to its advantage. DVD Verdict's review said:

Yet the three kids I've shown it to have been rooted to the screen. Creator Desmond Mullen, formerly of Industrial Light and Magic and a current producer for the Morehead Planetarium, makes an interesting observation: Pans, cuts, and other cinematic shorthand are not natural. We have to learn what they mean. Kids don't intuitively understand that a jump cut means something. Pig's straightforward manner and The Busy Little Engine's static framing mimic the way a child interprets the world. The proof is self evident: Kids dig this DVD.
