= Leon Despres =

American politician

Chicago Alderman from the 5th ward
- In office 1955–1975
- Preceded by: Robert E. Merriam
- Succeeded by: Ross Lathrop

Personal details
- Born: Leon Mathis Despres; February 2, 1908
- Died: May 6, 2009 (aged 101)
- Party: Democratic
- Spouse: Marian Alschuler (m. 1931; died 2007)
- Children: Robert Despres; Linda Baskin
- Occupation: Author; Attorney; Politician

Leon Mathis Despres (February 2, 1908 – May 6, 2009) was an American author, attorney and politician. He was best known as a long-time alderman in Chicago, where he regularly disagreed with then-mayor Richard J. Daley, often engaging in loud arguments and debates on the assembly floor.

== Background ==
A native of Chicago, Despres received his undergraduate and law degrees in 1927 and 1929, respectively, from the University of Chicago, where he was elected to Phi Beta Kappa, before beginning a legal practice.

== Career ==
In April 1955, Despres was elected to the Chicago City Council from the city's Hyde Park neighborhood, as alderman of the 5th ward. Serving until 1975, Despres gained fame as an independent Democrat, consistently opposing the policies of Chicago Mayor Richard J. Daley. In 1963, a young Bernie Sanders worked on Despres' reelection campaign. Frequently on the short end of 49-1 votes, Despres became known as the "liberal conscience of Chicago." Because of his strong advocacy of civil rights and open housing, Despres also became known as "the lone negro on the City Council," even though he was white and the council had six black alderman allied with the mayor.

On December 26, 1967, Despres was shot in the leg by two men in an alley. Characteristic of his political beliefs, he refused to blame the assailants and instead blamed poor social conditions.

In his final years Despres lived in Hyde Park and remained active in civic life. In 2005, he received the Benton Medal from the University of Chicago. Up until his death, Despres still maintained an office at the Chicago firm of Despres, Schwartz, and Geoghegan, managed by longtime colleague, Chicago labor lawyer Thomas Geoghegan.

== Life and work ==
Despres spoke five languages, served as Chicago City Council Parliamentarian for eight years after 20 years of service to the city. Despres authored Challenging the Daley Machine, A Chicago Alderman's memoir.

== Death ==
Despres died of heart failure in his Hyde Park home on May 6, 2009, at the age of 101.
