= Desa =

Desa or DESA may refer to:

== Companies ==
- Desa (company), a Turkish leather goods producer and retailer
- DESA company (Iran Heavy Diesel Manufacturing Company), a manufacturer of diesel engines

== Education ==
- Diplôme d'Études Supérieur Appliqué, a French educational degree
- Diplôme de l'École Spéciale d'Architecture, École Spéciale d'Architecture degree earned in Paris, France

== Places ==
- Desa (Bithynia), a Roman town of ancient Bithynia
- Desa, Dolj, a commune in Dolj County, Romania
- Desa (Indonesia), a type of village in Indonesia

== Other uses ==
- Distinguished Eagle Scout Award, service award of the Boy Scouts of America
- Desa (band), an American rock band
- Desa, Grand Prince of Serbia (ca. 1162–ca. 1165), Serbian ruler
- United Nations Department of Economic and Social Affairs (UN DESA)

== See also ==
- Desha (disambiguation)
- Desh (disambiguation)
- Desi (disambiguation)
