= Dessie (given name) =

Dessie is a masculine given name, often a short form of Desmond. Notable people with the name include:

== Men ==
- Dessie Baker (born 1977), Irish footballer
- Dessie Cullinane (1919–1990), Irish Gaelic footballer
- Dessie Dolan (born 1979), Irish former Gaelic footballer
- Dessie Donnelly (born 1959), Irish former hurler
- Dessie Ellis (born 1953), Irish politician
- Dessie Farrell (fl. 1990–present), Irish Gaelic football coach and former player
- Dessie Finnegan, 21st century Gaelic footballer
- Dessie Glynn (1928–2017), Irish footballer
- Dessie Gorman (born 1964), Irish former footballer
- Dessie Grew (1953–1990), member of the Provisional Irish Republican Army
- Dessie Hughes (c. 1943–2014), Irish racehorse trainer and jockey
- Dessie Hutchinson (born 1996), Irish hurler and former professional association footballer
- Dessie O'Hare (born 1956), Irish republican paramilitary
- Dessie Larkin (c. 1970–2019), Irish politician
- Dessie Sheehan (born 1949), Irish former snooker player
- Dessie Sloyan (born 1976), Irish former Gaelic footballer

== Women ==
- Dessie Smith Prescott (1906–2002), Florida’s first professional woman guide and first female licensed pilot
