= Dez =

Dez may refer to:

- Dez (tribe), also spelled Diz, one of the Assyrian tribes of Hakkari
- Dez River in Iran

== People ==
=== Music ===
- Dez Cadena (born 1961), American punk rock singer and guitarist
- Dez Dickerson (born 1955), American guitarist and singer, member of Prince's band The Revolution
- Dez Fafara (born 1966), American singer
- Dez Nado (born 1989), American hip hop and reggae singer, songwriter, record producer, and television producer

=== Sports ===
- Desmond Dez Bryant (born 1988), American National Football League wide receiver
- Dez Stewart (born 1993), American football wide receiver
- Edward Dezmon Dez White (born 1979), American National Football League wide receiver
- Dezmon Dez Giraldi (born 1986), Australian footballer
- Dez Wells (born 1992), American pro basketball player

=== Other ===
- Derek Dez Skinn (born 1951), British comic, magazine editor and author

== Fictional characters ==
- Dez Wade, from the American television series Austin & Ally
- Dez, from the American animated film Soul

== See also ==
- Des, a given name
