= Charles Martin (Illinois politician) =

American politician (1856-1917)

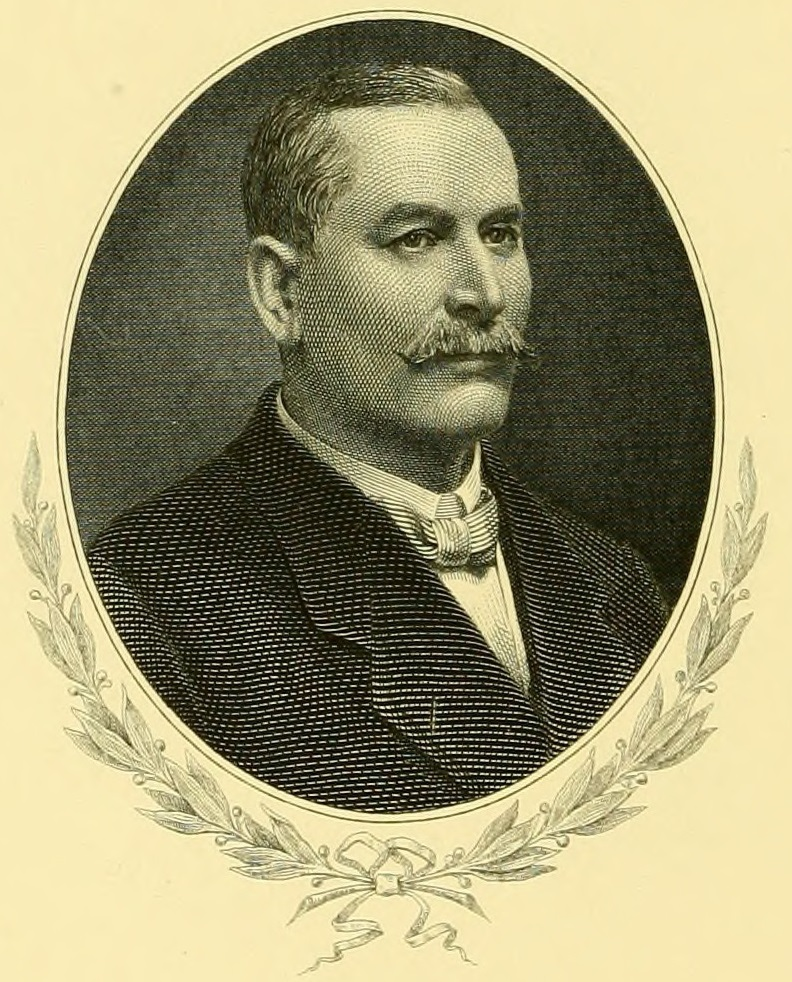
- Frontispiece of 1919's Charles Martin, Late a Representative from Illinois

Member of the U.S. House of Representatives from Illinois's 4th district
- In office March 4, 1917 – October 28, 1917
- Preceded by: James T. McDermott
- Succeeded by: John W. Rainey

Chicago Alderman from the 5th ward
- In office 1915–1917
- Preceded by: Patrick J. Carr
- Succeeded by: Joseph B. McDonough
- In office 1910–1914
- Preceded by: William J. McKenna
- Succeeded by: Thomas A. Doyle
- In office 1905–1907
- Preceded by: Thomas Rooney
- Succeeded by: Alex J. Burke
- In office 1901–1902
- Preceded by: William E. Kent
- Succeeded by: Robert K. Sloan

Chicago Alderman from the 6th ward
- In office 1894–1901
- Preceded by: Henry Stuckart
- Succeeded by: William Mavor

Personal details
- Born: May 20, 1856 Ogdensburg, New York, U.S.
- Died: October 28, 1917 (aged 61) Chicago, Illinois, U.S.
- Resting place: Mount Olivet Cemetery; Chicago, Illinois, U.S.
- Party: Democratic

Charles Martin (May 20, 1856 – October 28, 1917) was a U.S. representative from Illinois.

Born near Ogdensburg, St. Lawrence County, New York, Martin moved with his parents to Chicago, Illinois, in 1860. He attended the public schools, and engaged in business as a sewer contractor and later as a coal dealer. Martin served as alderman in the city council from 1894 to 1902, 1905 to 1907, 1910 to 1914, and was again elected in 1915.

Martin was elected as a Democrat to the Sixty-fifth Congress and served from March 4, 1917, until his death in Chicago, Illinois, October 28, 1917. He was interred in Mount Olivet Cemetery.

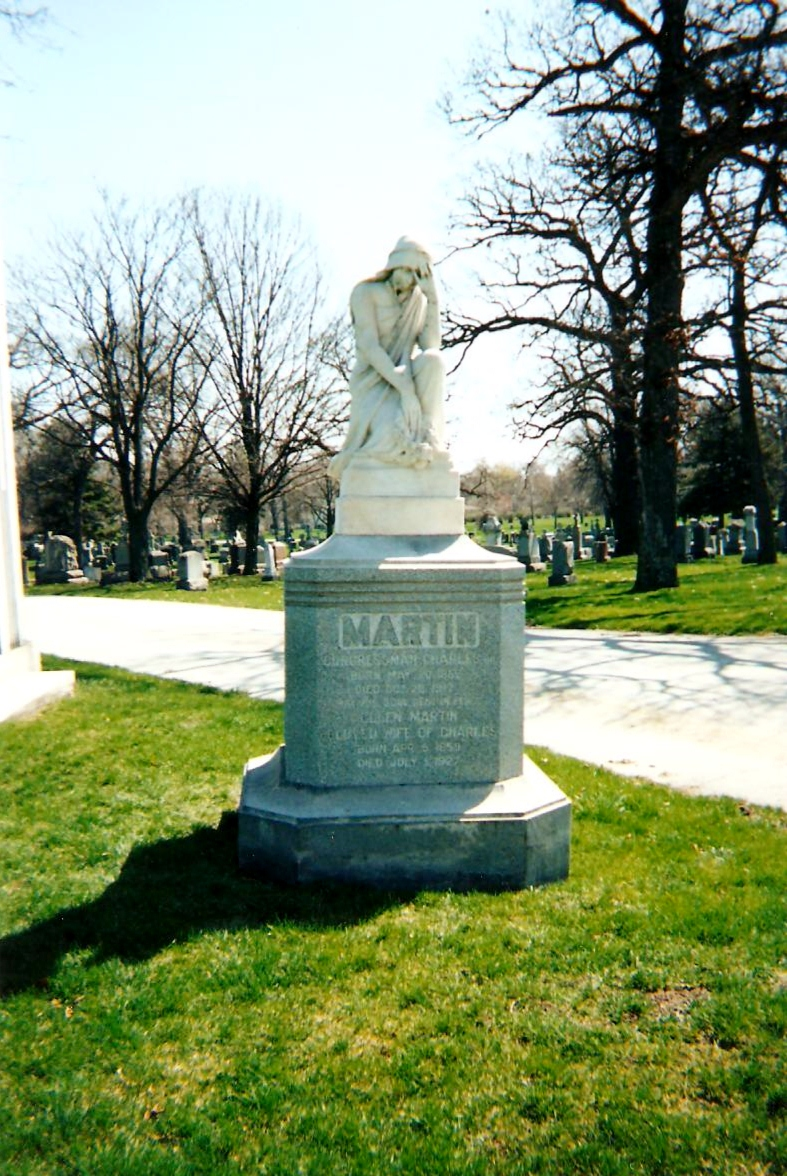
Martin Family Plot

== Chicago City Council ==
Martin had several stints as a member of the Chicago City Council.

In 1895 (during his first stint as an alderman), Martin was tried for charges of accepting a bribe. The trial was presided over by Judge Edward Fitzsimmons Dunne of the Circuit Court of Cook County. Citing lack of evidence, Judge Dunne instructed the jury at the end of the trial to acquit, which it did without any deliberation.

== U.S. Congress ==
In 1916, Martin was elected to represent Illinois's 4th congressional district in the United States House of Representatives. He died several months into his term in the 65th United States Congress.

== Controversy over birth certificate legality ==
New York authorities found that his birth certificate may have been lost in an incident three years prior to his death. Investigations into the loss of the birth certificate were able to locate the missing birth certificate underneath a filing cabinet in the old New York records building. Group members of the opposing political party questioned Martin's lack of birth certificate publicly, causing Martin to lose an amount of respect in the public's eye. GOP candidates in Illinois never acknowledged the missing birth certificate until after Martin's death. Eventually, they seceded on the argument and acknowledged the legitimacy of the document. Recent studies into the incident have been inconclusive.

== See also ==
- List of members of the United States Congress who died in office (1900–1949)

U.S. House of Representatives
Preceded by James T. McDermott	Member of the U.S. House of Representatives from Illinois's 4th congressional district March 4, 1917 - October 28, 1917	Succeeded by John W. Rainey
