= Thomas A. Doyle (Illinois politician) =

American politician

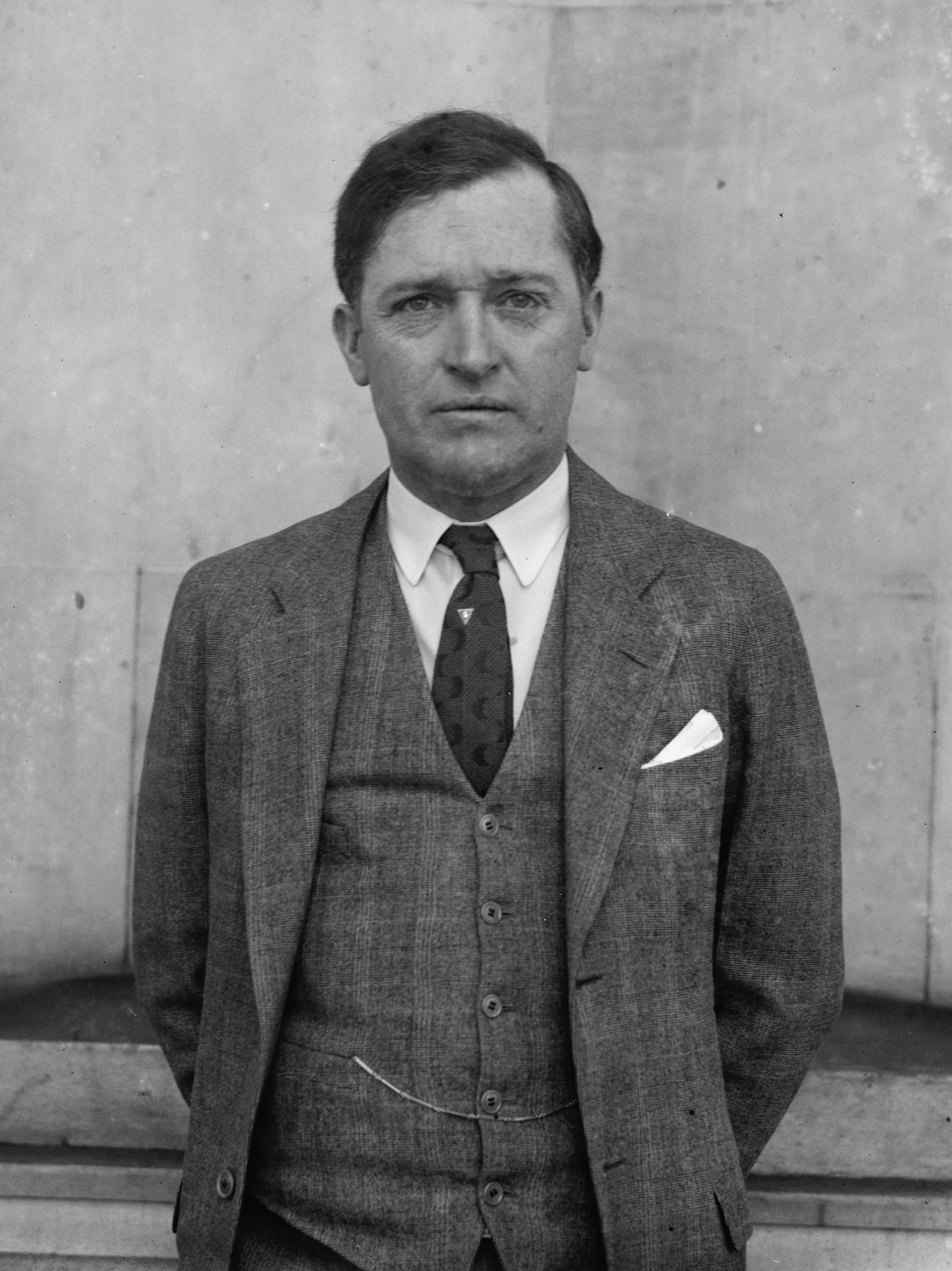

Member of the U.S. House of Representatives from Illinois's 4th district
- In office November 6, 1923 – March 3, 1931
- Preceded by: John W. Rainey
- Succeeded by: Harry P. Beam

Member of the Illinois House of Representatives
- In office 1918–1923

Chicago Alderman from the 5th ward
- In office 1914–1918 Serving with Patrick J. Carr (1914–15); Charles Martin (1915–17); Joseph B McDonough (1917–18)
- Preceded by: Charles Martin
- Succeeded by: Robert J. Mulcahy

Personal details
- Born: January 9, 1886 Chicago, Illinois, US
- Died: January 29, 1935 (aged 49) Chicago, Illinois, US
- Party: Democratic

Thomas Aloysius Doyle (January 9, 1886 – January 29, 1935) was a Democratic U.S. representative from Illinois, 1923–1931. He also served as a member of the Chicago City Council from 1914 to 1918 and from 1931 to 1935, and as a member of the Illinois House of Representatives from 1918 to 1923. He was involved in the real estate, insurance and automobile businesses.

U.S. House of Representatives
Preceded by John W. Rainey	Member of the U.S. House of Representatives from Illinois's 4th congressional district November 6, 1923 - March 3, 1931	Succeeded by Harry P. Beam
