= Des Dillon =

Des Dillon may refer to:

- Des Dillon (hurler) (1926–1964), Irish hurler and handballer
- Des Dillon (rugby union) (born 1980), Irish rugby union footballer
- Des Dillon (writer) (born 1960), Scottish writer
