= Desmon Yancy =

American politician (born 1971/72)

Member of the Chicago City Council from the 5th ward
- Incumbent
- Assumed office May 15, 2023
- Preceded by: Leslie Hairston

Personal details
- Born: 1971 or 1972 (age 54–55)
- Party: Democratic
- Education: DeVry University

Desmon C. Yancy (born 1971/1972) is an American politician and community organizer from Chicago. He is the alderperson for Chicago City Council's 5th ward, having won the 2023 election for the office. The 5th ward is on Chicago's south side, and includes portions of the Hyde Park, South Shore, and Woodlawn neighborhoods.

== Electoral history ==
2023 Chicago aldermanic election, 5th ward, runoff election
| Party | Candidate | Votes | % |
|---|---|---|---|
| Nonpartisan | Desmon C. Yancy | 6,184 | 51.78% |
| Nonpartisan | Martina 'Tina' Hone | 5,758 | 48.22% |
| Total votes | | 11,942 | 100% |

2023 Chicago aldermanic election, 5th ward, general election
| Party | Candidate | Votes | % |
|---|---|---|---|
| Nonpartisan | Desmon Yancy | 2,772 | 26.0 |
| Nonpartisan | Tina Hone | 1,983 | 18.6 |
| Nonpartisan | Renita Ward | 1,266 | 11.9 |
| Nonpartisan | Wallace Goode Jr. | 1,118 | 10.5 |
| Nonpartisan | Jocelyn Hare | 927 | 8.7 |
| Nonpartisan | Joshua Gray | 690 | 6.5 |
| Nonpartisan | Kris Levy | 488 | 4.6 |
| Nonpartisan | Gabriel Piemonte | 438 | 4.1 |
| Nonpartisan | Dee Perkins | 399 | 3.7 |
| Nonpartisan | Marlene Fisher | 397 | 3.7 |
| Nonpartisan | Robert Palmer | 197 | 1.8 |
| Nonpartisan | William Calloway (write-in) | 1 | 0.0 |
| Total votes | | 10,675 | 100.0 |

== See also ==
- List of Chicago alderpersons since 1923
