= Desmond Fitzgerald (professor) =

Irish doctor, 5th President of the University of Limerick

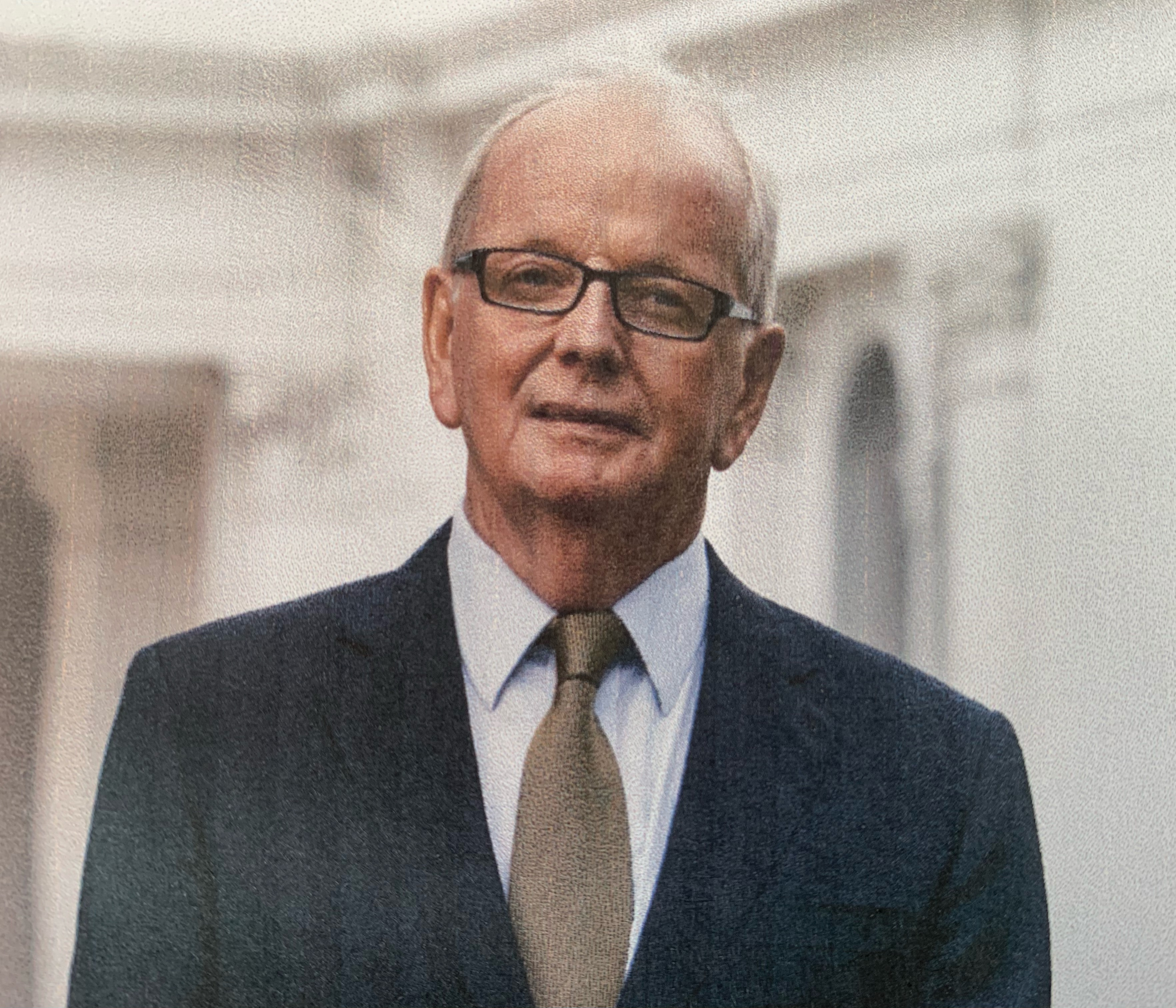
- Born: 30 October 1953 (age 72)
- Education: Oatlands College, University College Dublin, National University of Ireland, Trinity College, Dublin
- Occupations: medical doctor, academic leader
- Known for: biomedical and health research
- Notable work: President, University of Limerick
- Spouse: Margaret Fitzgerald
- Children: two daughters
- Parents: Thomas Joseph Fitzgerald (father); Maureen O’Donovan (mother)

Desmond Fitzgerald (born 30 October 1953) is an Irish medical doctor and academic leader. On 6 October 2016, Fitzgerald was announced as the president-elect of the University of Limerick. He took up this role in early 2017, becoming the fifth President. He resigned in May 2020 for "personal health concerns" citing the COVID-19 pandemic. Prior to this, Fitzgerald held the positions of vice president for health affairs with University College Dublin and chief academic officer at Ireland East Hospital Group from 2015 to 2016.

== Early life and education ==
Fitzgerald was born on 30 October 1953 to Maureen O’Donovan from Limerick and Thomas Joseph Fitzgerald from Belfast.

Fitzgerald attended Oatlands College, Stillorgan, Dublin. He studied medicine at University College Dublin (UCD), National University of Ireland and graduated with a MB, BAO, BCH (Honours), in 1977, and a Diploma in Mathematical Statistics from Trinity College Dublin in 1982. He was awarded an MD from the National University of Ireland in 1994.

== Career ==
=== Early career ===
Following his graduation from medical school at UCD and medical residency in the Mater Misericordiae University Hospital, the Charitable Infirmary Jervis Street Hospital and the Richmond Hospital in Dublin, Fitzgerald completed a Fellowship in the Royal College of Surgeons in Dublin. In 1983, he moved to Vanderbilt University in Nashville in the US to train in clinical pharmacology and cardiology. He remained in the US to head a large coronary care facility and a research programme into the causes of cardiovascular disease.

=== UCD and RCSI ===
In 1991, Fitzgerald returned to University College Dublin and shortly after this he established a research laboratory and held attending physician positions at several Dublin hospitals. In 1994, he was appointed professor and head of Department of Clinical Pharmacology at the Royal College of Surgeons in Ireland.

==== Research interests ====
Over the next 10 years, he built a research programme that bridged basic research and the clinical sciences. These included the RCSI Clinical Research Centre; the Institute for Biopharmaceutical Sciences; SurGen, a pharmacogenomics company; the RCSI Centre for Human Proteomics; Java Clinical Research, a spin-out CRO; the RCSI biobanking facility; and a bioinformatics programme that in partnership with Siemens designed the innovative ‘proteomics pipeline’.

He led the development of the college's translational medicine research programme, which culminated in the Programme for Human Genomics, a €42m research partnership between the three medical schools in Dublin that has since grown into the national programme for translational medicine (Molecular Medicine Ireland). From 2002, he was appointed as director of research and a member of the senior management team at RCSI.

=== Vice-President for Research, UCD ===
In 2004, Fitzgerald was appointed vice president for research and professor of molecular medicine in UCD. Fitzgerald developed the research strategy and oversaw its implementation through a new organisation, UCD Research. In five years, the university soared in global rankings to enter the top 100, trebled its research funding and increased its rate of academic publication by 250%.

Central to the research strategy in UCD was the development of a series of multi-disciplinary programmes with a strong translational focus. These have included six research institutes spanning humanities, social sciences, engineering, science and business; two Centres for Science Engineering and Technology; and seven Strategic Research Clusters. He developed a series of programmes in the humanities targeting major societal challenges in areas that included education and child development. Fitzgerald established 7 structured PhD programmes and a Researcher Career Framework and led the strategic recruitment of a large group of academics (the Stokes Lectureships and Professorships).

Fitzgerald was criticised for his high salary on joining UCD from RCSI. UCD consistently defended the salary on the basis that he achieved a major turnaround in research funding, amounting to €1bn during his time in the role.

==== UCD – Science District ====
Fitzgerald led the development of the UCD Science Centre, a €300m development that was funded through philanthropy and successive bids to the national investment fund in higher education, the Programme for Research in Third Level Institutions. Phase I opened in September 2011, with Phase II completed in September 2013, and as of October 2016, Phase III was in the planning stage. From the outset, it was envisaged that computational science and informatics would be central to the development. This ambition has been realised with an €80m national data analytics centre award to UCD and its partners in 2013.

The UCD Science District included several major programmes, including The Earth Institute and INSIGHT, the national data analytics programme. It was also home to Ireland's largest and most comprehensive campus for education and research in the Health Sciences, spanning biomedical research, population science and health services research. Fitzgerald also developed a science outreach programme, including the UCD Imagine Science Film Festival and Science Expression.

==== Biomedical and health research ====
During his tenure at UCD, Fitzgerald played a central role in the development of biomedical and health research, and building links to the hospital campuses. Central to these efforts was the UCD Conway Institute for Biomolecular and Biomedical Research. The institute opened in 2002, then a 13,000 m^{2} (140,000 sq ft) facility that was home to 400+ biomedical researchers. Several state-of-the-art technology platforms were developed in the institute to support the biomedical research community, including comprehensive proteomics facilities, gene sequencing and bioinformatics. Based on these capabilities, the Institute was well positioned in 2009 to establish the €20m national programme in Systems Biology funded by Science Foundation Ireland.

Allied to the UCD Conway Institute were facilities for translational medicine, with the core goal of improving patient care. The facilities included the Clinical Research Centres on the hospital campuses and the €18m Charles Institute for dermatology research and training. Extensive resources were built for drug development. These included the €50m Centre for Molecular Innovation and Drug Discovery and the €58m National Institute for Bioprocessing Research and Training.

Other facilities included the Centre for Nanomedicine, which is developing technologies for stem cell therapy, drug delivery and human imaging. Strong links were forged in nutrition between the biomedical programme and food science through the UCD Institute of Food and Health, which opened in 2011. Several programs were initiated to develop novel technologies for healthcare. These included Technology Research for Independent Living, a unique partnership with Intel and GE Healthcare that developed health technologies for deployment in the home and the Enterprise Ireland-funded centre, Applied Research for Connected Health.

=== Vice-President for Health Affairs, UCD, and Chief Academic Officer of the Ireland East Hospital Group ===
In 2013, Fitzgerald was appointed principal of the College of Health Sciences, vice-president for health affairs at UCD, and chief academic officer of the Ireland East Hospital Group to drive the development of health sciences at UCD and their integration with the affiliated hospitals. The initiative was central to the development of the emerging Academic Health Sciences Centre, a partnership between UCD and 11 hospitals, including two major teaching hospitals, the Mater Misericordiae University Hospital and St. Vincent's University Hospital.

==== Innovation, entrepreneurship and industry engagement ====
Fitzgerald developed extensive partnerships with industry centred on UCD's key research themes. These industry partnerships were pivotal to two Centres for Science Engineering and Technology and the seven Strategic Research Clusters on campus and involved upwards of 350 companies. Fitzgerald was also one of the founders of the National Digital Research Centre, a hub for support of new technology companies established in 2007. In addition, during his tenure UCD was awarded three industry-led Enterprise Ireland Technology Centres, including Food Health Ireland, Applied Research for Connected Health and the Centre for Advanced Research in Data Analytics.

Fitzgerald also developed the Knowledge Centre within the new UCD Science District to foster innovation and entrepreneurship. The Knowledge Centre is home to the Innovation Academy, which was established in 2011 to provide a unique programme in innovation and entrepreneurship to PhD students, and was extended to support the Irish government's Springboard initiative established to support the economic recovery during the recession of 2008.

==== Other works ====
Fitzgerald established the Office for EU Research to drive the university's efforts in Europe and led an International Strategic Collaboration Award to develop collaborative research in China, building on UCD's educational programs in Beijing, Shanghai and Shenzhen.

=== President, University of Limerick ===
In May 2017, Fitzgerald took up his appointment as president of the University of Limerick (UL) in the west of Ireland. UL was a public university of 16,000 students and 3,000 staff. He led development of a 5-year strategy, UL@50 2019–2024 (the university’s 50th anniversary is in 2022), which focused on educating outstanding graduates as active citizens, and placed particular focus on broadening student access and on the student experience. In 2017, the university became a ‘University of Sanctuary’, providing opportunities for asylum seekers from diverse ethnic, cultural and religious backgrounds to begin or to continue their university education. The university attracted privately funded scholarships to promote talent in sports and the arts, including in its MA in Classical String Performance. The university set out more broadly to improve the student experience, co-sponsoring with students a "healthy campus initiative" (including a controversial ban on smoking and vaping).

There was a strong focus on supporting and broadening research, particularly in enhanced human intelligence (artificial intelligence, data analytics) and health, supported by capital development, including a new Digital District located just off campus. Fitzgerald emphasised EU funding and in particular Marie Curie and European Research Council awards. Within 3 years UL was the recipient of the largest number of ERC awards nationally. He placed a particular emphasis on civic engagement. He believed that UL should contribute to the economic, social and cultural development of Limerick city and that the city would contribute to the student experience. For this reason, the university opted to develop a riverside city campus in a disused site that would provide for the development of a new postgraduate programme in business technology. These plans were disrupted by the Covid-19 epidemic. UL’s international programme had grown during Fitzgerald’s tenure, focused largely but not exclusively on postgraduate programmes tailored to different regions, in particular China, India, North America and North Africa. In January 2020, as the virus spread through Wuhan and Hubei, he established the university Covid Committee tasked initially with repatriating students who were attending universities or were on work experience in China and other countries hit by the epidemic. The committee also prepared the university to move all teaching on-line prior to closing the campus on 12 March 2020. The committee was also tasked with helping the community of Limerick and the MidWest to weather the pandemic. There were several initiatives the largest and most unique of which was the development of a field hospital on campus in the expectation of a major demand on the health services. This unique 65-bed facility was completed in 2 months and partly staffed by UL’s professional health staff and students.

==== Controversies ====
UL and Fitzgerald came under sustained criticism from politicians and minister for education Joe McHugh for UL's refusal to provide refunds to those students who were forced to vacate UL accommodation during the pandemic. The delay arose while Fitzgerald sought approval from the Governing Authority and this was finally forthcoming. Fitzgerald resigned on 26 May 2020 citing COVID-19 health-related personal reasons.

After his departure, there was discussion of aspects of spending at UL at the Dáil Public Accounts Committee There was criticism by one local politician of what he described as Fitzgerald's "extravagant" spending on the President's House, which had not been updated in 10 years. The press also reported on high external consultant costs, which had risen by 32%, to €3.05m in 2019; these included extraordinary legal fees arising from the findings and recommendations of two independent audits initiated by Fitzgerald on foot of a highly critical report on UL by the national broadcaster RTÉ shortly after he took up his appointment in May 2017.

== Personal research ==
Fitzgerald has published over 400 papers in cardiovascular research and in inflammation. His research is, as of 2020, in the area of the biology, genomics and proteomics of atherothrombosis. He has established several companies, including SurGen, which developed pharmacogenetics in support of clinical trials, and Java Clinical Research Ltd., a company established to develop technologies for the clinical investigation of drugs.

== Voluntary and public service roles ==
Fitzgerald has been appointed to the boards and committees of medical charities, international and national agencies and professional bodies. As chairman of the health-funding agency, the Health Research Board, his key achievement was securing €50m exchequer funding for national clinical research centers attached to medical schools. To date, three clinical research centres have been completed, in addition to the centre at RCSI, which he developed in 2002. He was also appointed to the Medical Council of Ireland and committees of the Irish Medicines Board, the UK National Institute for Health and Care Research, the Wellcome Trust, the US National Institute of Health, the Swiss National Research Science Foundation and the EU Frameworks Programmes and Horizon 2020. He has been on the boards of several hospitals in Ireland, most recently the University of Limerick Hospital Group. He has held several positions at the European Society of Cardiology and chaired the society's Working Group on Thrombosis. He has been appointed to the boards of several charities, most recently the Beacon Foundation. He is a Fellow of the Royal College of Physicians in Ireland, the European Society of Cardiology, the American Heart Association and the Association of American Physicians.

== Personal life ==
Desmond Fitzgerald is married to Margaret Fitzgerald, and they have two daughters.
