= Desi, Georgia =

Desi დესი
- Location within Georgia Location within Mtskheta-Mtianeti
- Coordinates: 42°36′26″N 44°21′06″E
- Country: Georgia
- Mkhare: Mtskheta-Mtianeti
- Municipality: Kazbegi
- Community: Kobi
- Elevation: 2,250 m (7,380 ft)

Population (2014)
  - Total: 0
- Time zone: UTC+04:00 (Georgia Time)

Desi (Georgian: დესი) is a village in the historical region of Khevi, north-eastern Georgia. It is located on the left bank of the Tergi tributary river – Desi. Administratively, it is part of the Kazbegi Municipality in Mtskheta-Mtianeti region or mkhare. Distance to the municipality center of Stepantsminda is 38 km (24 mi).

== Sources ==
- Georgian Soviet Encyclopedia, V. 3, p. 404, Tbilisi, 1978 year.
