= Ella Daish =

British environmental activist

Ella Daish is a British environmental activist campaigning to persuade retailers and manufacturers to remove plastic from menstrual products. In February 2018, whilst working as a postal worker, she started the End Period Plastic campaign. She went on to become a full-time activist. The BBC put Daish on its 100 Women of 2019 annual list of 100 inspiring and influential women from around the world.

"Period products are the fifth most common item found on Europe's beaches" and "200,000 tonnes of [such] material is believed to end up in UK landfill every year." Around 90% of a menstrual pad is plastic.

In December 2018 Daish launched the Eco Period Box campaign to address period poverty, donating plastic-free and reusable period products around the UK. In 2019 she helped persuade Caerphilly County Borough Council to spend all of its grant money for providing free menstrual products to schools, on eco-friendly products. Councils had been asked to spend only 10% of the money on reusables.

== Awards and recognition ==
- Included in the BBC Radio 4 Woman's Hour Power list 2020
- One of the BBC's 100 women of 2019

== See also ==
- Disposable product
- Plastic pollution
