= .desi =

Top-level domain

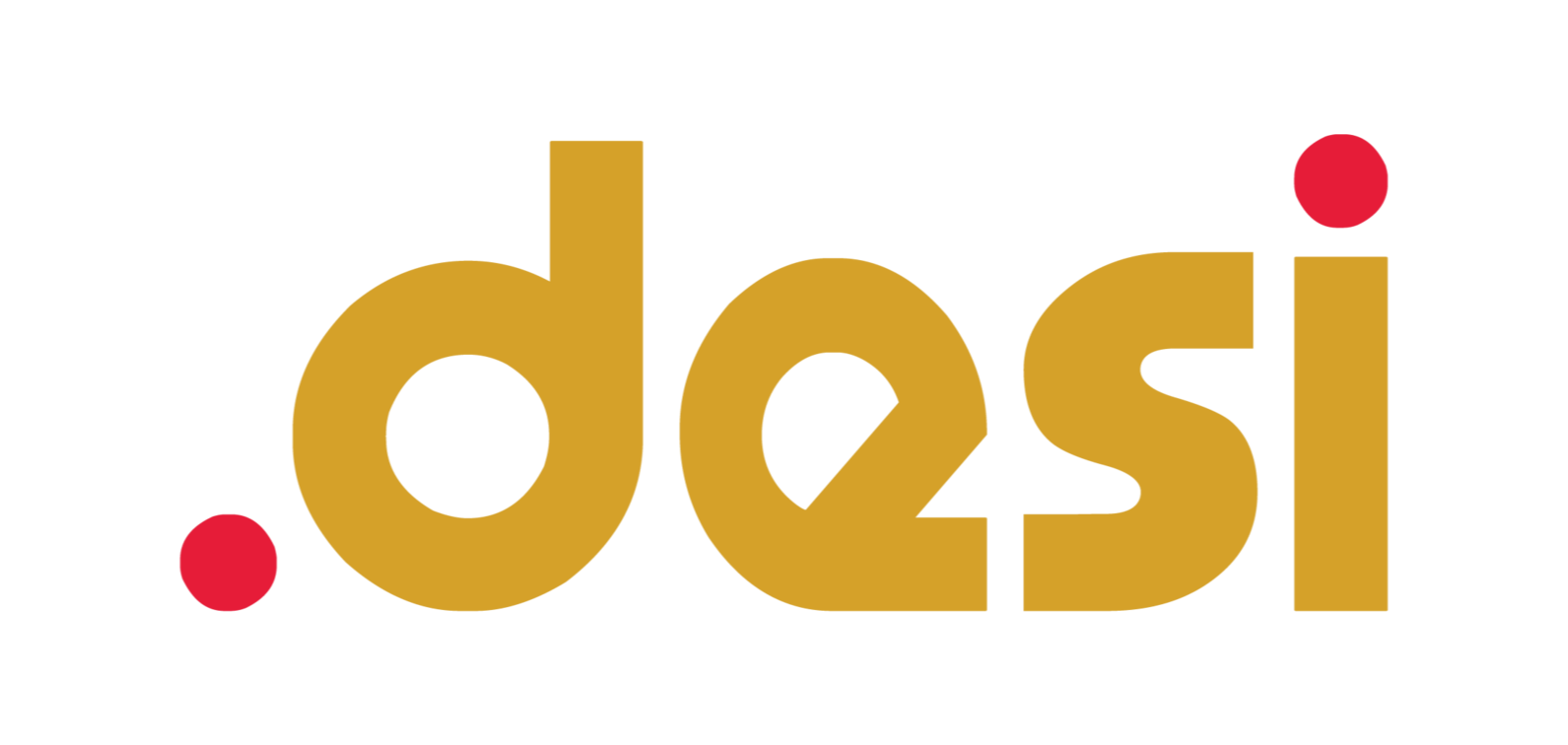
- Introduced: 2014
- Removed: October 28, 2023
- Registry: Desi Networks LLC
- Registration restrictions: None
- Documents: ICANN Registry Agreement
- Dispute policies: UDRP
- DNSSEC: Yes

.desi was a top-level domain (TLD) used in the Domain Name System of the Internet. It is operated by Desi Networks LLC. The domain name was originally applied for by Afilias Inc. and Desi Networks LLC, but the latter won the auctions, though the original amount is private.

The stated purpose of the domain is to promote domain name owners. The word desi is derived from Sanskrit deśīya and means "one from our country". The domain refers to websites of Desis in India, Pakistan, and Bangladesh, and their diasporas around the world.

Desi Networks announced its intention to terminate the registry in April 2023, and it was terminated in October 2023.
