= Desmond Mullen =

American film director

- Born: August 1, 1966 (age 60); Tampa, Florida, United States
- Education: University of South Florida
- Website: www.busylittlestudios.com

Desmond Mullen (born August 1, 1966) is an American producer, director, actor, and writer. He is best known as the narrator and the voice of the puppet Pig in The Busy Little Engine series of DVDs.

Mullen started off as a sound designer in Off-Broadway theater but later moved on to television, working as a production assistant for Comedy Central (then known as The Comedy Channel) and eventually, as technical director under effects director Scott Squires at Industrial Light & Magic for Paul McCartney's 1991 music video, "Off the Ground". Starting in 2000, Mullen was a Show Producer at Morehead Planetarium and Science Center where he helped create science education shows including "Magic Tree House: Space Adventure" by Will Osborne and Mary Pope Osborne. Currently, Mullen is the creative director at Busy Little Studios.

== Personal background ==
Desmond Mullen was born in Tampa, Florida. His father, John O'Keefe Mullen, Sr., was a businessman and engineer who developed the first plastic-lined paper cup in 1956. His mother, Ann, an artist and musician, had her hands full raising five kids.

Mullen attended the University of South Florida in Tampa, Florida, and studied technical theater and electronic music.
