= Dess =

Dess may refer to:

- Dess–Martin periodinane, a chemical reagent used to oxidize primary alcohols to aldehydes and secondary alcohols to ketones
- Albert Dess (born 1947), German politician and member of the European Parliament for Bavaria
- Darrell Dess (born 1935), former American football guard in the National Football League for the New York Giants
- Zachary Dess (born 1993), known professionally as Two Feet, American singer, songwriter, and producer
- December "Dess" Holiday, an as-of-yet unseen character in Toby Fox's Deltarune
- Dess railway station, formerly in Aberdeenshire, Scotland

DESS may refer to:

- Distributed energy storage system, batteries connected to the electrical grid
- Diplôme d'études supérieures spécialisées, a former French graduate degree
