= Abel Nado =

Central African politician (died 2024)

Minister of Public Works and Urban Development
- In office 27 May 1983 – 21 September 1985
- President: Andre Kolingba

Minister of Energy, Mining, and Geology
- In office 1 September 1981 – 27 May 1983
- President: Andre Kolingba
- Succeeded by
Prefectural posts
Prefect of Nana-Mambéré
In office 1994–1995
Prefect of Ouham
In office 1992–?
Prefect of Bamingui-Bangoran
In office 4 January 1972 – 18 August 1973
Preceded by	André Perrière
Succeeded by	David Zoumande

Personal details
- Born: 1933/1934
- Died: 10 June 2024 (aged 90) Bangui, Central African Republic
- Occupation: Soldier; Politician

Military service
- Allegiance: France; Central African Republic
- Branch/service: Troupes coloniales FACA
- Rank: Major general
- Battles/wars: First Indochina War; Algerian War

Major general Abel Nado (1933/1934 – 10 June 2024) was a Central African military officer and politician who served in various ministerial and prefectural positions.

== Life and career ==
Belonging to Mandja, Nado was born in 1933 or 1934. He then enlisted Troupes coloniales and participated at First Indochina War and Algerian War. He joined FACA after Central African Republic gained its independence. On 1 January 1968, he earned the rank of second lieutenant and later was promoted to lieutenant.

Nado became the prefect of Bamingui-Bangoran from 4 January 1972 until 18 August 1973 with captain rank. While serving as the prefect of Bamingui-Bangoran, he also assumed the position of Sub-Prefect of Bamingui (16 May 1973 - 18 August 1973). Upon stepping down as a prefect, he worked at Enerca as its director general on 21 February 1974.

Subsequently, his rank was elevated to major, colonel, and eventually brigadier general. He was also one of the first signal officers in FACA and served as the Director General of the National Office for Veterans and War Victims.

In 1981, he endorsed Kolingba's coup. Afterward, Kolingba appointed Nado as Minister of Energy, Mining, and Geology from 1 September 1981 to 27 May 1983, then served as the Minister of Public Works and Urban Development from 27 May 1983 to 21 September 1985 under the National Recovery Military Committee.

In the 1990s, Nado served as the Prefect of Ouham (1992-?) and Prefect of Nana-Mambéré (1994 - 1995). Shortly after the 2003 Central African Republic coup d'état, François Bozizé designated Nado as one of the two army representatives on the Conseil national de transition (CNT) on 27 May 2003.

Nado died in Bangui on 10 June 2024, at the age of 90 due to illness. He received an official funeral ceremony at Camp Kassaï on 28 June 2024. On the next day, he was buried in Mbembi.

== Awards ==
- Knight Order of Central African Gratitude – 1 January 1972.
- , Knight Order of Central African Merit – 7 November 1975.

== Bibliography ==
- Serre, Jacques; Fandos-Rius, Juan (2014). Répertoire de l'administration territoriale de la République centrafricaine. Paris: L’Harmattan. ISBN 978-2-343-01298-8.
