= Desmond Tan =

Desmond Tan may refer to:

- Desmond Tan (actor) (born 1986), Singaporean actor
- Desmond Tan (politician) (born 1970), Singaporean politician
