= Michael J. Desmond =

American attorney

48th Chief Counsel of the U.S. Internal Revenue Service (IRS) and Assistant General Counsel in the Department of the Treasury
- In office March 8, 2019 – January 20, 2021
- President: Donald Trump
- Secretary: Steven Mnuchin
- Succeeded by: William M. Paul (Acting)

Personal details
- Born: Michael J. Desmond
- Party: Republican
- Education: UC Santa Barbara, Catholic University of America, Columbus School of Law
- Occupation: Attorney

Michael J. Desmond is an American tax attorney and former federal government official. He previously served as the 48th Chief Counsel of the U.S. Internal Revenue Service (IRS) and Assistant General Counsel in the Department of the Treasury. He was confirmed by the Senate on February 27, 2019 and began serving as Chief Counsel on March 4, 2019. Shortly before the Inauguration of Joe Biden, Desmond resigned from his position as Chief Counsel effective January 20, 2021, succeeded by Acting Chief Counsel William M. Paul.

== Education ==
In 1990, Michael Desmond graduated from the University of California, Santa Barbara with a Bachelor of Arts degree in political science and history. In 1994, he graduated magna cum laude from Catholic University of America, Columbus School of Law with a JD degree. He attended New York University (June 1990-August 1990) and Georgetown University Law School (September 2000-August 2001) for graduate coursework.

== Career ==
From September 1990 to January 1991, Michael Desmond served as legislative assistant for Congressman Douglas H. Bosco. From February 1991 to June 1991, he worked as Special Assistant to the Chief of Staff, House Committee on Veterans' Affairs. And, he served as a summer law clerk from May to August in 1992 and 1993 at Columbus Community Legal Services in Washington, DC.

After law school, Desmond clerked for Judge Ronald S. W. Lew of the U.S. District Court for the Central District of California in Los Angeles from August 1994 to August 1995. After his clerkship, he worked at the U.S. Department of Justice from 1995 to 2000 as a trial attorney in the Tax Division. From 2000 to 2004, he worked at Bingham McCutchen LLP and its predecessor firm, McKee Nelson LLP. In 2005, he served as Tax Legislative Counsel at the U.S. Department of the Treasury, Office of Tax Policy. In 2007, he started teaching at Georgetown University Law Center as an adjunct professor of law. In 2008, Desmond returned to work at Bingham McCutchen LLP. In 2012, he left Bingham McCutchen LLP to start his own law practice in Santa Barbara, California. On March 6, 2018, Desmond was nominated to the position of IRS Chief Counsel and Assistant General Counsel, U.S. Department of the Treasury. He dissolved his professional corporation on August 10, 2018.

In support of Michael Desmond's nomination, the Tax Executives Institute (a global membership organization with more than 7,000 members who work for over 3,200 companies) submitted a letter to the U.S. Senate Committee on Finance expressing its "unqualified support" urging his swift confirmation. The Federal Bar Association's Section on Taxation submitted a letter to the U.S. Senate Committee on Finance to express its support for Michael Desmond to the position of Chief Counsel of the IRS urging the Committee to "approve his nomination swiftly." And, in a letter submitted to the Senate Finance Committee, 10 former IRS Chief Counsels or Acting Chief Counsels applauded the nomination of Michael Desmond and recommended "that he be confirmed as quickly as possible." In the past he served as a tax advisor to the Trump Organization. President Trump reportedly asked Senate Majority Leader Mitch McConnell in early 2019 to ensure that Desmond was confirmed quickly. The request roughly coincided with a push by members of the new Democratic Party majority in Congress to request Trump's tax returns.

== Honors and awards ==
The Best Lawyers in America, Leading Lawyer in Tax Law

Chambers USA: America's Leading Lawyers for Business, Tax, and Tax Controversy

IRS Commissioner's Award (2008)

IRS Chief Counsel's Award (2008)

Treasury Secretary's Honor Award (2007)

U.S. Department of Justice, Tax Division Award for Sustained Superior Performance (1998)

Fellow, American College of Tax Counsel

== Bar & Court Admissions ==
- U.S. Tax Court
- U.S. Court of Appeals, Fourth Circuit
- U.S. Court of Appeals, Seventh Circuit
- U.S. Court of Appeals, Ninth Circuit
- U.S. District Court, Central District of California
- U.S. Court of Federal Claims

== Memberships ==
Michael Desmond is a member of various associations: (1) American Bar Association, Section of Taxation (2000–present); Council director (2017–present); chair and vice chair, Standards of Tax Practice Committee (2012-2017); chair and vice chair, Tax Shelters Committee (2008-2012); (2) District of Columbia Bar Association, Tax Section (2000-2008); chair and vice chair, Tax Audits and Litigation Committee (2001-2004); (3) American College of Tax Counsel (2008–present); Regent (2016-present); (3) University of California Santa Barbara Alumni Association (1990–present); Member, board of directors (2018–present); (4) Santa Barbara Athletic Association (2012–present); Treasurer and member, board of directors (2018–present); (5) Santa Barbara Triathlon Club (2012–present).

== Published writings ==
(1) Author, foreword to Jasper L. Cummings, Jr.'s, "The Supreme Court's Federal Tax Jurisprudence," American Bar Association (2d ed. 2016).

(2) Principal drafter, American College of Tax Counsel Comments on Recent Changes to IRS Appeals Conference and Settlement Practices (October 2016).

(3) Contributing author, ABA Section of Taxation Comments on Partnership Tax Audit and Litigation Regime Revisions (November 2015).

(4) Contributing author, ABA Section of Taxation Comments on 2014 Offshore Voluntary Disclosure Program and the Streamlined Program (October 2015).

(5) Author, "Legislative Authority to Regulate Paid Tax Return Preparers: The Focus Turns to Congress to Act," Procedurally Taxing Blog (February 2015).

(6) Author, "Is There a Future Role for Circular 230 in the IRS's Efforts to Improve Tax Compliance?", Procedurally Taxing Blog (October 2014).

(7) Author, "Final Circular 230 Written Tax Advice Regulations," Procedurally Taxing Blog (June 2014).

(8) Author, "The Continuing Evolution of Circular 230: Proposed Regulations Repealing the 'Covered Opinion' Standards, Imposing General Competence Requirements and Expanding Existing Procedures to Ensure Compliance," CCH Journal of Tax Practice and Procedure (December 2013-January 2014).

(9) Principal drafter, ABA Section of Taxation Comments on Proposed Regulations Relating to Practice Before the Internal Revenue Service (November 2012).

(10) Contributing author, ABA Section of Taxation Comments on Notice 2011-62, Ex Parte Communications Between Appeals and Other Internal Revenue Service Employees (August 2011).

(11) Contributing author, ABA Section of Taxation Comments on Notice 2010-62 Regarding Implementation of the Economic Substance Legislation (January 2011).

(12) Author, "Revisiting the Broad Definition of Return Preparer," Tax Notes (January 2011).

(13) Contributing author, ABA Section of Taxation Comments on Circular 230 Sections 10.2, 10.3, 10.4, 10.5, 10.6, 10.30, and 10.34 (December 2010).

(14) Co-author, "Practical Considerations for Schedule UTP...an Addendum," The Tax Executive (October 2010).

(15) Co-author, "Practical Considerations in Preparing for the Impending Schedule UTP Filing Requirement,'' The Tax Executive (September 2010).

(16) Author, "Resolution of Financial Products Tax Controversies," Practicing Law Institute (2009).

(17) Co-author, "Improving Compliance Through Changes to the Return Preparer Regulations," BNA (2008).

(18) Author, "Opinion Standards for Tax Practitioners Under U.S. Department of the Treasury Circular 230," Tax and Corporate Governance (Wolfgang Schon ed.) (2008).

(19) Author, note, "Limiting a Defendant's Peremptory Challenges," 42 Cath. U.L. Rev. 389 (1993).
