= Desmond G. Fitzgerald =

English electrician and spiritualist

Desmond Gerald Fitzgerald (1834–1905) was an English electrician and spiritualist.

Fitzgerald founded a weekly magazine known as Electrician in 1861. It later became a monthly magazine. Fitzgerald was also involved in improving the manufacture of white lead.

Fitzgerald was a vice-president of the British National Association of Spiritualists and an editor for a spiritualist journal Spiritual Notes. He was a convinced believer in mesmerism and spiritualism. He also defended the discredited "Odic force" of Carl Reichenbach.

He was an early council member of the Society for Psychical Research.
