= Desi Curry =

Northern Irish football manager

Personal information
- Full name: Desmond Watson Curry
- Date of birth: 19 September 1960 (age 66)
- Place of birth: Northern Ireland

Managerial career
- Years: Team
- 200?–2009: Northern Ireland U16
- 2013: Northern Ireland U15
- 2018: Gibraltar (interim)

Desmond Watson Curry (born 19 September 1960) is a Northern Irish football manager, who is the General Manager of Glentoran since his appointment in summer 2022. He was the caretaker manager of the Gibraltar national football team between January and June 2018. He served as Technical Director for the Irish Football Association between 2009 and 2013, and Gibraltar Football Association from 2017 to 2022.

== Career ==
Curry played football at schoolboy level, representing Stranmillis University College's side while studying to become a P.E. teacher. After graduating, he became the head of Physical Education at Laurehill Community College before managing youth teams part-time at Irish Football Association.

In 2009, Curry, having previously managed Northern Ireland under 16 for a number of years, was named IFA's Technical Director. He was also manager of the under-15 side in 2013, but left both his post as manager and Technical Director in August of that year. He then worked with both FIFA and UEFA as a pro licence qualified consultant.

On 10 January 2017, Curry was announced as Technical Director of Gibraltar Football Association. On 20 February 2018, he was appointed interim manager of the national team after Jeff Wood left the post. His first game in charge occurred on 25 March, against Latvia; a goal from Liam Walker granted a 1–0 win for the hosts, which was the nation's first ever official triumph at home.

At the start of the 2022/23 season he was appointed the General Manager of Glentoran having left his role as Technical Director in Gibraltar in early summer 2022.
