= Desi (film) =

2000 film

- Directed by: Maria Ramos
- Distributed by: Paradiso Filmed Entertainment
- Release date: 2000
- Running time: 90 minutes
- Country: Netherlands
- Language: Dutch

Desi is a 2000 Dutch documentary film by director Maria Ramos, featuring the 11-year-old Dutch girl named Desi. Coming from a dysfunctional family, her daily life is full of insecurities, and she is therefore relying on the help of social services in Amsterdam.

== Awards ==
- Gouden Kalf award Best Documentary – Long (2001)
- IDFA audience award (2000)
