= Dez Nado =

American hip hop and reggae singer, songwriter and producer

- Also known as: D-Eazy
- Born: Joseph Scott; Jacksonville, Florida, U.S.
- Genres: Hip hop, reggae, pop
- Occupations: Rapper; record producer; television producer; songwriter
- Instruments: Vocals; keyboards; piano; drums
- Years active: 2010–present
- Label: VIPSquad Entertainment
- Website: vipsquadnation.com/dez-nado

Joseph Scott, also known as Dez Nado, is an American hip hop and reggae singer, songwriter, and record producer from Jacksonville, Florida. He is also a television producer who produces and directs Jacksonville's first and only cable reality TV series, Life & Grind: Duval and LIVE from New Jax City, both of which air on north Florida/south Georgia's CW Network affiliate WCWJ/CW.

== Career ==
Nado saw his earliest successes in college, where he used his platform as college DJ at a small university in Jacksonville to distribute and promote his music and host his own showcases on campus. After nearly being killed by a gunshot to the chest in 2009, he shifted the tone of his music from "self-destructive to self-productive" and started using his music as a platform for pushing a progressive agenda and promoting non-violence in one of the most violent cities in Florida. This new sound led to his first major digital distribution deal after releasing his first mixtape series, No Hands, which included No Hands, No Hands 1.5 and No Hands 2 distributed by KKR/Island/Def Jam and his most progressive work in response to his views on the Trayvon Martin shooting and the Stand Your Ground policy in his home state of Florida. No Hands 2 is distributed by MTV.

Nado premiered a cable reality TV series called Life & Grind: Duval on Bounce TV focusing not only on his daily life as an independent artist, but also on other indie artists and bands affiliated with his self-managed entertainment label. After winning the title of Jacksonville Artist of the Year and performing at the 2015 BET Hip Hop Awards, Nado released his second mixtape album LaDolceVita, in 2016 with Caskey, Taylor Gang artist Lola Monroe, and Fetty Wap. Nado made the local news before the mixtape album release and TV series premiere with his $1.4 Million dollar One Spark crowdfunding pitch in Spring 2014 for his Life & Grind project and northeast Florida's largest annual indie concert series Duval Spring Fest, which he started in college.

== Life and Grind TV Series ==
Following the release of the LaDolceVita album, The Life & Grind TV franchise expanded due to the show's popularity. It now includes an Atlanta spin-off in addition to the original Jacksonville show. Dez signed an agreement with the CW 17 Television Network to air eight episodes on the larger CW affiliate WCWJ for season 4. This move resulted in nearly seven times the number of viewers as the previous seasons in addition to the 7,500+ viewer base on DeKalb-Comcast 25 (Atlanta). Dez attributed the growth of his buzz as an artist, evident in the 12,000+ units moved of his "Futuristic" single and tens of thousands of downloads/streams following the release of his latest single "Duele", to his growing independent cable television platform in one of his latest interviews with hip hop blog HipHopApproved.com. His events and music were praised by G-Unit Records and Def Jam. His third solo mixtape album LogophiliYaH is planned to be released in the fall of 2019 and accompanied by a spring and fall college tour supported by his TV platform.

== Discography ==
=== Studio albums ===
Title	Album details
No Hands 2	Released: April 29, 2011; Label: KKR/Island/Def Jam
LaDolceVita	Released: March 1, 2016; Label: VIPSquad Entertainment/Universal Music Group
LogophiliYaH (LP)	Released: TBA; Label: VIPSquad Entertainment/Universal Music Group

=== Singles ===
==== As lead artist ====
List of singles as lead performer, showing year released and album name
Title	Year	Album
"Check Out My Lean"	2011	No Hands 2
"Futuristic"	2015	LaDolceVita
"Duele"	2016	LaDolceVita
"Shoot Ya Shot"	2019	Shoot Ya Shot LP/LPYH SSNZ
