= Des O'Connor (rugby league) =

Australian rugby league footballer and administrator

Personal information
- Full name: Desmond O'Connor

Playing information
- Position: Halfback
Club
Years	Team	Pld	T	G	FG	P
1968–73	Newtown	69	3	0	0	9
- Source: Whiticker/Hudson

Des O'Connor is an Australian former rugby league footballer who played in the 1960s and 1970s.

== Playing career ==
O'Connor came from St. George's rugby union ranks to play for Newtown in the late 1960s. He played five seasons with Newtown between 1968 and 1973 and captained the club to victory in the 1973 Wills Cup Final against St George Dragons.

He retired at the end of the 1974 season after successfully taking the Newtown reserve grade team to the premiership. Des O'Connor became treasurer of Newtown in the 1980s.
