= List of townlands of County Kerry =

This is a sortable table of the approximately 2,756 townlands in County Kerry, Ireland.

Duplicate names occur where there is more than one townland with the same name in the county. Names marked in bold typeface are towns and villages, and the word Town appears for those entries in the Acres column.

== Townland list ==
Townland	Acres	Barony	Civil Parish	Poor law union												
Abbey Island	83	Dunkerron South	Kilcrohane	Cahersiveen												
**Abbeydorney**	Town	Clanmaurice	O'Dorney	Tralee												
Abbeylands	171	Trughanacmy	Kilcolman	Killarney												
Acres	818	Corkaguiny	Ballinvoher	Dingle												
Acres	467	Iraghticonnor	Kilconly	Listowel												
Acres	77	Magunihy	Aglish	Killarney												
Addergown	454	Clanmaurice	Rattoo	Listowel												
Adraval	206	Trughanacmy	Ballincuslane	Tralee												
Affouley	140	Iraghticonnor	Galey	Listowel												
Aghabeg East	704	Clanmaurice	Kiltomy	Listowel												
Aghabeg Middle	337	Clanmaurice	Kiltomy	Listowel												
Aghabeg West	319	Clanmaurice	Kiltomy	Listowel												
Aghacarrible	146	Corkaguiny	Kinard	Dingle												
Aghacoora	260	Clanmaurice	Kiltomy	Listowel												
Aghacurreen	412	Magunihy	Aghadoe	Killarney												
Aghagadda	195	Iveragh	Killemlagh	Cahersiveen												
Aghalee Beg	71	Magunihy	Aglish	Killarney												
Aghalee More	185	Magunihy	Aghadoe	Killarney												
Aghamore North	406	Clanmaurice	Killahan	Tralee												
Aghamore South	563	Clanmaurice	Killahan	Tralee												
Aghanacrinna	215	Clanmaurice	Killahan	Tralee												
Aghanagram Lower	491	Iraghticonnor	Aghavallen	Listowel												
Aghanagram Middle	741	Iraghticonnor	Aghavallen	Listowel												
Aghanagram Upper	322	Iraghticonnor	Aghavallen	Listowel												
Aghanboy	148	Iveragh	Killemlagh	Cahersiveen												
Aghatubrid	992	Iveragh	Caher	Cahersiveen												
Aghort	536	Iveragh	Killemlagh	Cahersiveen												
Aglish	201	Magunihy	Aglish	Killarney												
Aglish	187	Corkaguiny	Minard	Dingle												
**Ahafona**	Town	Iraghticonnor	Killehenny	Listowel												
Ahalahana	809	Iraghticonnor	Murher	Listowel												
Ahane	638	Trughanacmy	Castleisland	Tralee												
Ahane	404	Dunkerron North	Knockane	Cahersiveen												
Ahane	187	Magunihy	Kilbonane	Killarney												
Ahane	178	Trughanacmy	Ballymacelligott	Tralee												
Ahaneboy	1,545	Trughanacmy	Castleisland	Tralee												
Ahascra	207	Iraghticonnor	Ballyconry	Listowel												
Ahaun	848	Trughanacmy	Brosna	Tralee												
Ahimma	105	Iraghticonnor	Killehenny	Listowel												
Allaghee Beg(North)	25	Iveragh	Killemlagh	Cahersiveen												
Allaghee Beg(South)	10	Iveragh	Killemlagh	Cahersiveen												
Allaghee More	487	Iveragh	Killemlagh	Cahersiveen												
Alohart	807	Dunkerron North	Knockane	Killarney												
Anablaha	293	Magunihy	Kilcummin	Killarney												
**Anascaul**	Town	Corkaguiny	Ballynacourty	Dingle												
Anglont	321	Magunihy	Killorglin	Killarney												
Anglore	64	Trughanacmy	Castleisland	Tralee												
Ankail	657	Dunkerron South	Kilcrohane	Kenmare												
Anna Beg	169	Trughanacmy	Killeentierna	Killarney												
Anna More	495	Trughanacmy	Killeentierna	Killarney												
Annadale	188	Dunkerron North	Killorglin	Killarney												
Annagap	328	Corkaguiny	Ballynacourty	Dingle												
Annagh	1,178	Trughanacmy	Annagh	Tralee												
Annagh	276	Trughanacmy	Kiltallagh	Tralee												
Annagh Beg	1,345	Magunihy	Kilcummin	Killarney												
Annagh Beg	729	Magunihy	Killaha	Killarney												
Annagh Island	32	Trughanacmy	Annagh	Tralee												
Annagh More	869	Magunihy	Killaha	Killarney												
Annaghily More	1,107	Magunihy	Aghadoe	Killarney												
Arabela	154	Trughanacmy	Ballymacelligott	Tralee												
Ardacluckeen	320	Dunkerron North	Killorglin	Killarney												
Ardagh	889	Clanmaurice	Killury	Listowel												
Ardagh	199	Magunihy	Kilcummin	Killarney												
Ardagh	145	Magunihy	Killarney	Killarney												
Ardamore	447	Corkaguiny	Kinard	Dingle												
Ardamore	128	Corkaguiny	Kilmalkedar	Dingle												
Ardaneanig	232	Magunihy	Killarney	Killarney												
Ardasbaun	83	Trughanacmy	Kilgarrylander	Tralee												
Ardatedaun	192	Trughanacmy	Kiltallagh	Tralee												
Ardbeg	150	Corkaguiny	Stradbally	Dingle												
Ardcanaght	1,118	Trughanacmy	Kilgarrylander	Tralee												
Ardconnell	233	Clanmaurice	Kilmoyly	Tralee												
Ardcost	955	Iveragh	Killemlagh	Cahersiveen												
Ardcrone	231	Trughanacmy	Currans	Killarney												
Ardcullen	198	Clanmaurice	Rattoo	Listowel												
Ardcullen-Marshes	168	Clanmaurice	Rattoo	Listowel												
Ardea	608	Glanarought	Tuosist	Kenmare												
Ardeen	604	Dunkerron South	Kilcrohane	Kenmare												
**Ardfert**	Town	Clanmaurice	Ardfert	Tralee												
Ardfert	370	Clanmaurice	Ardfert	Tralee												
Ardfert Oughter	105	Clanmaurice	Ardfert	Tralee												
Ardfery Oughter	105	Clanmaurice	Ardfert	Tralee												
Ardkearagh	362	Dunkerron South	Kilcrohane	Cahersiveen												
Ardlaghas	368	Dunkerron North	Knockane	Killarney												
Ardmeelode	349	Magunihy	Kilcolman	Killarney												
Ardmoneel	261	Trughanacmy	Killorglin	Killarney												
Ardmore	289	Dunkerron South	Kilcrohane	Kenmare												
Ardnamweely	45	Magunihy	Killarney	Killarney												
Ardoughter	864	Clanmaurice	Killury	Listowel												
Ardrahan	488	Clanmaurice	Killahan	Tralee												
Ardrahan	97	Clanmaurice	Kilmoyly	Tralee												
Ardraw	197	Dunkerron North	Knockane	Killarney												
Ardrinane	301	Corkaguiny	Ballynacourty	Dingle												
Ardroe	436	Corkaguiny	Ballinvoher	Dingle												
Ards	211	Magunihy	Aghadoe	Killarney												
Ards	92	Dunkerron North	Knockane	Killarney												
Ardshanavooly	104	Magunihy	Killarney	Killarney												
Ardsheelane East	410	Dunkerron South	Kilcrohane	Kenmare												
Ardsheelane West	276	Dunkerron South	Kilcrohane	Kenmare												
Ardteegalvan	480	Magunihy	Killaha	Killarney												
Ardtully	505	Glanarought	Kilgarvan	Kenmare												
Ardydonaghan	490	Clanmaurice	Duagh	Listowel												
Ardywanig	484	Magunihy	Kilnanare	Killarney												
Arraglen	1,086	Corkaguiny	Cloghane	Dingle												
Arraglen	877	Corkaguiny	Killiney	Dingle												
Ash-hill	345	Trughanacmy	Ballymacelligott	Tralee												
Astee East	607	Iraghticonnor	Aghavallen	Listowel												
Astee West	697	Iraghticonnor	Aghavallen	Listowel												
Aughacasla North	260	Corkaguiny	Killiney	Dingle												
Aughacasla South	111	Corkaguiny	Killiney	Dingle												
Aughanna	88	Corkaguiny	Stradbally	Dingle												
Aughils	581	Corkaguiny	Ballinvoher	Dingle												
Aughrim	1,349	Iraghticonnor	Murher	Glin												
Aulanebane	217	Clanmaurice	Killahan	Tralee												
Aulaneduff	162	Clanmaurice	Killahan	Tralee												
Avenue	67	Magunihy	Killarney	Killarney												
Awuaskirtaun	1,060	Magunihy	Kilcummin	Killarney												
Ayle	57	Clanmaurice	Rattoo	Listowel												
Bahaghs	794	Iveragh	Killinane	Cahersiveen												
Ballagh	2,303	Glanarought	Kilgarvan	Kenmare												
Ballagh	331	Dunkerron North	Knockane	Killarney												
Ballaghadigue	264	Iraghticonnor	Listowel	Listowel												
Ballahacommane	1,128	Magunihy	Killarney	Killarney												
Ballahantouragh	1,080	Trughanacmy	Dysert	Tralee												
Ballahantouragh	81	Trughanacmy	Ballincuslane	Tralee												
Ballard Lower	702	Iveragh	Prior	Cahersiveen												
Ballard Upper	291	Iveragh	Prior	Cahersiveen												
Balleen	262	Dunkerron South	Kilcrohane	Cahersiveen												
Ballinagroun	182	Corkaguiny	Ballinvoher	Dingle												
Ballinard	1,048	Trughanacmy	Ballincuslane	Tralee												
Ballinasig	506	Corkaguiny	Dingle	Dingle												
Ballinbranhig	301	Clanmorris	Rattoo	Listowel												
Ballinclare	65	Corkaguiny	Ballynacourty	Dingle												
Ballinclemesig	384	Clanmaurice	Killury	Listowel												
Ballinclemesig	289	Clanmaurice	Ballyheige	Tralee												
Ballincloher	361	Clanmaurice	Kilcaragh	Listowel												
Ballincloher East	291	Clanmaurice	Kiltomy	Listowel												
Ballincloher West	175	Clanmaurice	Kiltomy	Listowel												
Ballincolla	393	Corkaguiny	Dunurlin	Dingle												
Ballincollig	626	Trughanacmy	O'Brennan	Tralee												
Ballincota	137	Corkaguiny	Ventry	Dingle												
Ballincraheen	215	Clanmaurice	Kiltomy	Listowel												
Ballincrossig	292	Clanmaurice	Rattoo	Listowel												
Ballindooganig	201	Trughanacmy	Ballyseedy	Tralee												
Ballineanig-castlequarter	171	Corkaguiny	Marhin	Dingle												
Ballineanig-churchquarter	228	Corkaguiny	Marhin	Dingle												
Ballineedora	113	Trughanacmy	Ballymacelligott	Tralee												
Ballineesteenig	308	Corkaguiny	Cloghane	Dingle												
Ballineetig	105	Corkaguiny	Garfinny	Dingle												
Ballingarraun	591	Corkaguiny	Cloghane	Dingle												
Ballingarry Island	1	Clanmaurice	Ballyheige	Tralee												
Ballinglanna	676	Clanmaurice	Killury	Listowel												
Ballinglanna	51	Corkaguiny	Dunquin	Dingle												
Ballingowan	229	Trughanacmy	Ratass	Tralee												
Ballingowan	148	Iraghticonnor	Lisselton	Listowel												
Ballingowan	75	Corkaguiny	Killiney	Dingle												
Ballinillane	281	Magunihy	Aglish	Killarney												
Balliniry	93	Corkaguiny	Ballyduff	Dingle												
Ballinknock	112	Trughanacmy	Ballymacelligott	Tralee												
Ballinknockane	876	Corkaguiny	Kilquane	Dingle												
Ballinknockane	191	Corkaguiny	Kilgobban	Tralee												
Ballinleague	245	Corkaguiny	Ventry	Dingle												
Ballinloghig	2,144	Corkaguiny	Kilquane	Dingle												
Ballinlough	109	Dunkerron North	Aghadoe	Killarney												
Ballinorig East	329	Trughanacmy	Ratass	Tralee												
Ballinorig South	275	Trughanacmy	Ratass	Tralee												
Ballinorig West	132	Trughanacmy	Ratass	Tralee												
Ballinprior	488	Clanmaurice	Ardfert	Tralee												
Ballinrannig	143	Corkaguiny	Marhin	Dingle												
Ballinruddery	418	Clanmaurice	Finuge	Listowel												
Ballinskelligs	713	Iveragh	Prior	Cahersiveen												
Ballintaggart	208	Corkaguiny	Garfinny	Dingle												
Ballintaggart	162	Corkaguiny	Ballinvoher	Dingle												
Ballintemple	146	Corkaguiny	Dunquin	Dingle												
Ballintermon	312	Corkaguiny	Ballynacourty	Dingle												
Ballintlea	423	Corkaguiny	Ventry	Dingle												
Ballintleave	391	Iveragh	Killorglin	Killarney												
Ballintleave Commons	677	Iveragh	Killorglin	Killarney												
Ballintobeenig	377	Trughanacmy	Ratass	Tralee												
Ballintogher	211	Clanmaurice	Dysert	Listowel												
Ballinvariscal	405	Trughanacmy	Nohaval	Tralee												
Ballinvarrig	151	Magunihy	Molahiffe	Killarney												
Ballinvogig	174	Corkaguiny	Minard	Dingle												
Ballinvoher	148	Clanmaurice	Kiltomy	Listowel												
Ballinvoher	72	Clanmaurice	Ardfert	Tralee												
Ballinvosherig East	82	Trughanacmy	Ratass	Tralee												
Ballinvosherig West	84	Trughanacmy	Ratass	Tralee												
Ballinvownig	324	Corkaguiny	Garfinny	Dingle												
Balloonagh	48	Trughanacmy	Tralee	Tralee												
Ballyaglisha	191	Corkaguiny	Dunurlin	Dingle												
Ballyameenboght	68	Corkaguiny	Dingle	Dingle												
Ballyameentrant	118	Corkaguiny	Kildrum	Dingle												
Ballyandreen	175	Corkaguiny	Ballinvoher	Dingle												
Ballyard	148	Trughanacmy	Annagh	Tralee												
Ballyarkane Eighter	500	Trughanacmy	Kilgarrylander	Dingle												
Ballyarkane Oughter	670	Trughanacmy	Kilgarrylander	Dingle												
Ballyaukeen	299	Trughanacmy	Ballymacelligott	Tralee												
Ballybane	262	Magunihy	Molahiffe	Killarney												
Ballybeg	708	Trughanacmy	Killeentierna	Killarney												
Ballybeg	188	Corkaguiny	Ventry	Dingle												
Ballybeg	173	Corkaguiny	Dingle	Dingle												
Ballybeg	76	Trughanacmy	Ballymacelligott	Tralee												
Ballybeggan	254	Trughanacmy	Ratass	Tralee												
Ballybowler North	488	Corkaguiny	Garfinny	Dingle												
Ballybowler South	434	Corkaguiny	Garfinny	Dingle												
Ballybrack	1,221	Corkaguiny	Kilquane	Dingle												
Ballybrack	390	Magunihy	Kilnanare	Killarney												
Ballybrack	316	Magunihy	Aglish	Killarney												
Ballybrack	134	Dunkerron South	Kilcrohane	Cahersiveen												
Ballybrannagh	143	Trughanacmy	Ballymacelligott	Tralee												
Ballybroman	260	Clanmaurice	O'Dorney	Tralee												
**Ballybunnion**	Town	Iraghticonnor	Killehenny	Listowel												
Ballybunnion	371	Iraghticonnor	Killehenny	Listowel												
Ballycanneen	601	Corkaguiny	Dingle	Dingle												
Ballycarbery East	235	Iveragh	Caher	Cahersiveen												
Ballycarbery South	159	Iveragh	Caher	Cahersiveen												
Ballycarbery West	184	Iveragh	Caher	Cahersiveen												
Ballycarnahan	426	Dunkerron South	Kilcrohane	Cahersiveen												
Ballycarty	182	Trughanacmy	Ballyseedy	Tralee												
Ballycasheen	353	Magunihy	Killarney	Killarney												
Ballyconnell	362	Clanmaurice	Kilflyn	Listowel												
Ballyconry	166	Iraghticonnor	Ballyconry	Listowel												
Ballycrispin	79	Trughanacmy	Kiltallagh	Tralee												
Ballycullane	455	Magunihy	Kilcummin	Killarney												
Ballycullane	420	Corkaguiny	Ballinvoher	Dingle												
Ballycurrane	251	Corkaguiny	Kilquane	Dingle												
Ballydarrig	178	Iveragh	Killinane	Cahersiveen												
Ballydavid	429	Corkaguiny	Kilquane	Dingle												
Ballydeenlea	134	Magunihy	Kilcummin	Killarney												
Ballydonohoe	816	Iraghticonnor	Galey	Listowel												
Ballydooneen	99	Clanmaurice	O'Dorney	Tralee												
Ballydowny	91	Magunihy	Aghadoe	Killarney												
Ballydribbeen	80	Magunihy	Killarney	Killarney												
Ballydrisheen	59	Magunihy	Killarney	Killarney												
**Ballyduff**	Town	Clanmaurice	Rattoo	Listowel												
Ballyduff	1,430	Trughanacmy	Castleisland	Tralee												
Ballyduff	1,070	Corkaguiny	Ballyduff	Dingle												
Ballyduhig	518	Clanmaurice	Kilshenane	Listowel												
Ballydunlea	1,065	Trughanacmy	Annagh	Tralee												
Ballydwyer east	184	Trughanacmy	Ballymacelligott	Tralee												
Ballydwyer Middle	136	Trughanacmy	Ballymacelligott	Tralee												
Ballydwyer West	179	Trughanacmy	Ballymacelligott	Tralee												
Ballyea	153	Trughanacmy	Ballynahaglish	Tralee												
Ballyeagh	563	Iraghticonnor	Killehenny	Listowel												
Ballyegan	728	Iraghticonnor	Galey	Listowel												
Ballyegan	384	Trughanacmy	Nohaval	Tralee												
Ballyeightragh	222	Corkaguiny	Dingle	Dingle												
Ballyeightragh	187	Corkaguiny	Kildrum	Dingle												
Ballyenaghty	190	Trughanacmy	Clogherbrien	Tralee												
Ballyferriter	469	Corkaguiny	Dunurlin	Dingle												
Ballyfinnane	508	Magunihy	Molahiffe	Killarney												
Ballyfinoge	179	Trughanacmy	Ballymacelligott	Tralee												
Ballygamboon Lower	201	Trughanacmy	Kiltallagh	Tralee												
Ballygamboon Upper	1,076	Trughanacmy	Kiltallagh	Tralee												
Ballyganneen	362	Corkaguiny	Kilquane	Dingle												
Ballygarran	887	Trughanacmy	Ballynahaglish	Tralee												
Ballygarret	206	Corkaguiny	Kilgobban	Tralee												
Ballygarret	181	Clanmaurice	Kilfeighny	Listowel												
Ballygarret	115	Clanmaurice	Duagh	Listowel												
Ballyglasheen	334	Corkaguiny	Ballinvoher	Dingle												
Ballygowloge	201	Iraghticonnor	Listowel	Listowel												
Ballygree	141	Trughanacmy	Dysert	Tralee												
Ballygrenane	547	Clanmaurice	Finuge	Listowel												
Ballygriffin	418	Glanarought	Kenmare	Kenmare												
Ballyhar	282	Magunihy	Kilcredane	Killarney												
Ballyheabought	743	Corkaguiny	Dingle	Dingle												
Ballyhearny East	194	Iveragh	Valencia	Cahersiveen												
Ballyhearny West	346	Iveragh	Valencia	Cahersiveen												
**Ballyheige**	Town	Clanmaurice	Ballyheige	Tralee												
Ballyheige	351	Clanmaurice	Ballyheige	Tralee												
Ballyhemikin	160	Clanmaurice	Kilmoyly	Tralee												
Ballyhennessy	417	Clanmaurice	Dysert	Listowel												
Ballyhenry	93	Clanmaurice	Killahan	Tralee												
Ballyhoneen	1,100	Corkaguiny	Ballyduff	Dingle												
Ballyhorgan	296	Clanmaurice	Rattoo	Listowel												
Ballyhorgan East	510	Clanmaurice	Dysert	Listowel												
Ballyhorgan Marshes	137	Clanmaurice	Rattoo	Listowel												
Ballyhorgan South	266	Clanmaurice	Dysert	Listowel												
Ballyhorgan West	225	Clanmaurice	Dysert	Listowel												
Ballyickeen Commons	25	Corkaguiny	Dunquin	Dingle												
Ballyiskeen	172	Corkaguiny	Dunquin	Dingle												
Ballykealy	172	Clanmaurice	Kilmoyly	Tralee												
Ballykissane	236	Trughanacmy	Killorglin	Killarney												
Ballylahiff	216	Clanmaurice	O'Dorney	Tralee												
Ballyledder	1,157	Dunkerron North	Knockane	Killarney												
Ballyline East	318	Iraghticonnor	Aghavallen	Listowel												
Ballyline West	1,667	Iraghticonnor	Aghavallen	Listowel												
Ballyloagane	527	Clanmaurice	Ballyheige	Tralee												
**Ballylongford**	Town	Iraghticonnor	Aghavallen	Listowel												
Ballyloughran	87	Iraghticonnor	Lisselton	Listowel												
Ballylusky	161	Corkaguiny	Kilmalkedar	Dingle												
Ballymacadam	172	Trughanacmy	Castleisland	Tralee												
Ballymacandrew Nth.	132	Clanmaurice	Kilmoyly	Tralee												
Ballymacandrew South	155	Clanmaurice	Kilmoyly	Tralee												
Ballymacandy	204	Trughanacmy	Kilcolman	Killarney												
Ballymacaquim East	435	Clanmaurice	Killahan	Tralee												
Ballymacaquim West	192	Clanmaurice	Killahan	Tralee												
Ballymacasy	508	Iraghticonnor	Aghavallen	Listowel												
Ballymacdonnell	177	Trughanacmy	Killeentierna	Killarney												
Ballymacdoyle	430	Corkaguiny	Dingle	Dingle												
Ballymacelligott	97	Trughanacmy	Ballymacelligott	Tralee												
Ballymacjordan	257	Clanmaurice	Duagh	Listowel												
Ballymacpierce	257	Trughanacmy	Nohaval	Killarney												
Ballymacprior	226	Trughanacmy	Killorglin	Killarney												
Ballymacquin Lower	471	Clanmaurice	Ardfert	Tralee												
Ballymacquin Upper	200	Clanmaurice	Ardfert	Tralee												
Ballymacthomas	395	Trughanacmy	Ballyseedy	Tralee												
Ballymakegoge	756	Trughanacmy	Ballynahaglish	Tralee												
Ballymalis	502	Magunihy	Kilbonane	Killarney												
Ballymanagh	181	Iveragh	Valencia	Cahersiveen												
Ballymore	43	Corkaguiny	Cloghane	Dingle												
Ballymore East	121	Corkaguiny	Kildrum	Dingle												
Ballymore West	179	Corkaguiny	Kildrum	Dingle												
Ballymorereagh	473	Corkaguiny	Dingle	Dingle												
Ballymullen	84	Trughanacmy	O'Brennan	Tralee												
Ballymullen	29	Trughanacmy	Ratass	Tralee												
Ballynabloun	225	Iveragh	Killemlagh	Cahersiveen												
Ballynabooly	234	Corkaguiny	Dingle	Dingle												
Ballynaboul	92	Trughanacmy	Castleisland	Tralee												
Ballynabrennagh Lower	221	Trughanacmy	Ratass	Tralee												
Ballynabrennagh Upper	242	Trughanacmy	Ratass	Tralee												
Ballynabuck	309	Corkaguiny	Kilquane	Dingle												
Ballynacarrig East	196	Magunihy	Aglish	Killarney												
Ballynacarrig West	180	Magunihy	Aglish	Killarney												
Ballynacourty	362	Corkaguiny	Ballynacourty	Dingle												
Ballynafullia	249	Glanarought	Tuosist	Kenmare												
Ballynagare	991	Clanmaurice	Dysert	Listowel												
Ballynageragh	529	Clanmaurice	Kilcaragh	Listowel												
Ballynagraigue	382	Clanmaurice	Duagh	Listowel												
Ballynahallia	338	Trughanacmy	Ballincuslane	Tralee												
Ballynahinch	80	Trughanacmy	Ballymacelligott	Tralee												
Ballynahoulort	373	Trughanacmy	Tralee	Tralee												
Ballynahow	1,954	Corkaguiny	Kilquane	Dingle												
Ballynahow	175	Iveragh	Killemlagh	Cahersiveen												
Ballynahow	65	Corkaguiny	Dunquin	Dingle												
Ballynahow	63	Corkaguiny	Cloghane	Dingle												
Ballynahow Beg	83	Iveragh	Killinane	Cahersiveen												
Ballynahow Commons	176	Corkaguiny	Dunquin	Dingle												
Ballynahow More	441	Iveragh	Killinane	Cahersiveen												
Ballynahulla	1,510	Trughanacmy	Ballincuslane	Tralee												
Ballynahunt	662	Corkaguiny	Ballinvoher	Dingle												
Ballynakilly	217	Iveragh	Dromod	Cahersiveen												
Ballynakilly	117	Iveragh	Glanbehy	Cahersiveen												
Ballynakilly Lower	673	Iveragh	Glanbehy	Cahersiveen												
Ballynakilly Upper	743	Iveragh	Glanbehy	Cahersiveen												
Ballynalacken	289	Corkaguiny	Cloghane	Dingle												
Ballynamaunagh	333	Magunihy	Kilcummin	Killarney												
Ballynamona Lower	159	Trughanacmy	Kiltallagh	Tralee												
Ballynamona Upper	297	Trughanacmy	Kiltallagh	Tralee												
Ballynamuddagh	250	Clanmaurice	Duagh	Listowel												
Ballynana	294	Corkaguiny	Kilmalkedar	Dingle												
Ballynane	500	Corkaguiny	Ballinvoher	Dingle												
Ballynaraha North	86	Corkaguiny	Dunquin	Dingle												
Ballynaraha South	46	Corkaguiny	Dunquin	Dingle												
Ballynasare	121	Trughanacmy	Clogherbrien	Tralee												
Ballynasare Beg	71	Corkaguiny	Minard	Dingle												
Ballynasare Lower	376	Corkaguiny	Minard	Dingle												
Ballynasare Mountain	617	Corkaguiny	Minard	Dingle												
Ballynaskreena	311	Clanmaurice	Killury	Listowel												
Ballynavenoor	636	Corkaguiny	Kilquane	Dingle												
Ballynoe	238	Clanmaurice	Killury	Listowel												
Ballynoneen	820	Iraghticonnor	Aghavallen	Listowel												
Ballynorig East	432	Clanmaurice	Kilmoyly	Tralee												
Ballynorig West	438	Clanmaurice	Kilmoyly	Tralee												
Ballyoughtera North	436	Corkaguiny	Dunurlin	Dingle												
Ballyoughtera South	420	Corkaguiny	Dunurlin	Dingle												
Ballyoughtragh North	211	Trughanacmy	Kilcolman	Killarney												
Ballyoughtragh South	314	Trughanacmy	Kilcolman	Killarney												
Ballyouneen	656	Iraghticonnor	Rattoo	Listowel												
Ballyplimoth	232	Trughanacmy	Ballincuslane	Tralee												
**Ballyquin**	Town	Corkaguiny	Cloghane	Dingle												
Ballyquin	308	Corkaguiny	Cloghane	Dingle												
Ballyraymeen	239	Trughanacmy	Kiltallagh	Tralee												
Ballyraymeen	131	Trughanacmy	Kiltallagh	Tralee												
Ballyreehan East	213	Clanmaurice	Kilfeighny	Listowel												
Ballyreehan West	248	Clanmaurice	Kilfeighny	Listowel												
Ballyrishteen	692	Corkaguiny	Garfinny	Dingle												
Ballyrobert	100	Clanmaurice	Kilmoyly	Tralee												
Ballyroe	148	Corkaguiny	Kilquane	Dingle												
Ballyroe	128	Trughanacmy	Ardfert	Tralee												
Ballyronan	236	Clanmaurice	Ballyheige	Tralee												
Ballyseedy	440	Trughanacmy	Ballyseedy	Tralee												
Ballysheen	668	Clanmaurice	O'Dorney	Tralee												
Ballyspillane	29	Magunihy	Killarney	Killarney												
Ballytrasna	174	Magunihy	Aglish	Killarney												
Ballytrasna	110	Corkaguiny	Ventry	Dingle												
Ballyvelly	179	Trughanacmy	Tralee	Tralee												
Ballyvirrane	302	Magunihy	Kilcolman	Killarney												
Ballywiheen	417	Corkaguiny	Marhin	Dingle												
Baltovin	135	Clanmaurice	Kilmoyly	Tralee												
Baltovin	114	Clanmaurice	O'Dorney	Tralee												
Baltovin	25	Clanmaurice	Killahan	Tralee												
Banard	626	Magunihy	Kilcummin	Killarney												
Banemore	1,246	Clanmaurice	Kilfeighny	Listowel												
Banna East	236	Clanmaurice	Kilmoyly	Tralee												
Banna South	197	Clanmaurice	Kilmoyly	Tralee												
Banna West	231	Clanmaurice	Kilmoyly	Tralee												
Banna-mountain	633	Clanmaurice	Kilmoyly	Tralee												
Banoge Beg	49	Corkaguiny	Minard	Dingle												
Banoge North	628	Corkaguiny	Minard	Dingle												
Banoge South	325	Corkaguiny	Minard	Dingle												
Banshagh	310	Trughanacmy	Killorglin	Killarney												
Barleymount East	213	Magunihy	Aglish	Killarney												
Barleymount Middle	85	Magunihy	Aglish	Killarney												
Barleymount West	252	Magunihy	Aglish	Killarney												
Barna	1,571	Trughanacmy	Ballincuslane	Tralee												
Barnadarrig	157	Iraghticonnor	Killehenny	Listowel												
Barnastooka	1,216	Glanarought	Kilgarvan	Kenmare												
Barrack	269	Corkaguiny	Stradbally	Dingle												
Barraduff	408	Magunihy	Aghadoe	Killarney												
Barraduff	341	Glanarought	Kenmare	Kenmare												
Barraduff	164	Iraghticonnor	Lisselton	Listowel												
Barrakilla	201	Trughanacmy	Ballymacelligott	Tralee												
Barrow	876	Trughanacmy	Ardfert	Tralee												
Baslickane	487	Dunkerron South	Kilcrohane	Cahersiveen												
Bauragoogeen	391	Iraghticonnor	Murher	Glin												
Baurearagh	1,966	Glanarought	Kilcaskan	Kenmare												
Baurearagh	750	Glanarought	Kilgarvan	Kenmare												
Bausheen	701	Glanarought	Kilgarvan	Kenmare												
Bawnachaulig	194	Iraghticonnor	Dysert	Listowel												
Bawnaglanna	498	Trughanacmy	Killeentierna	Killarney												
Bawnard	541	Magunihy	Nohavaldaly	Killarney												
Bawnaskehy	514	Trughanacmy	Castleisland	Tralee												
Bawnboy	291	Trughanacmy	Clogherbrien	Tralee												
Bawnluskaha	132	Trughanacmy	Castleisland	Tralee												
Bawnmore	578	Clanmaurice	Kilmoyly	Tralee												
Beal East	476	Iraghticonnor	Kilconly	Listowel												
Beal Middle	184	Iraghticonnor	Kilconly	Listowel												
Beal West	141	Iraghticonnor	Kilconly	Listowel												
Bealagrellagh	72	Trughanacmy	Ballymacelligott	Tralee												
Bealdarrig	578	Dunkerron North	Templenoe	Kenmare												
Bealkelly	173	Clanmaurice	Finuge	Listowel												
Beaufort	171	Dunkerron North	Knockane	Killarney												
Bedford	943	Iraghticonnor	Galey	Listowel												
Beenanaspuck	580	Iraghticonnor	Knockanure	Listowel												
Beenateevaun	494	Trughanacmy	Killeentierna	Killarney												
Beenbane	264	Iveragh	Dromod	Cahersiveen												
Beenbane	235	Corkaguiny	Garfinny	Dingle												
Beennageeha	364	Trughanacmy	O'Brennan	Tralee												
Beennameelane	171	Iraghticonnor	Dysert	Listowel												
Beginish	217	Iveragh	Caher	Cahersiveen												
Beginish	32	Corkaguiny	Dunquin	Dingle												
Behaghane	737	Dunkerron South	Kilcrohane	Cahersiveen												
Beheenagh	875	Corkaguiny	Kilgobban	Tralee												
Beheenagh	325	Trughanacmy	Castleisland	Tralee												
Beheenagh	294	Trughanacmy	O'Brennan	Tralee												
Beheenagh	269	Magunihy	Kilcummin	Killarney												
Beheens East	244	Clanmaurice	Kilshenane	Listowel												
Beheens West	287	Clanmaurice	Kilshenane	Listowel												
Benmore	223	Clanmaurice	Rattoo	Listowel												
Billeragh	420	Clanmaurice	Kilshenane	Listowel												
Bird Island	4	Glanarought	Tuosist	Kenmare												
Bishopscourt North	85	Clanmaurice	Rattoo	Listowel												
Bishopscourt South	144	Clanmaurice	Rattoo	Listowel												
Blackparks	33	Iraghticonnor	Lisselton	Listowel												
Blasket Island Great	1,020	Corkaguiny	Dunquin	Dingle												
**Blennerville**	Town	Trughanacmy	Annagh	Tralee												
Bogare	687	Dunkerron South	Kilcrohane	Kenmare												
Bohacogram	1,044	Dunkerron South	Kilcrohane	Kenmare												
Bohacullia	699	Dunkerron South	Templenoe	Kenmare												
Boheeshil	497	Dunkerron North	Knockane	Cahersiveen												
Boherboy	247	Trughanacmy	Currans	Killarney												
Boherboy	148	Iveragh	Caher	Cahersiveen												
Boherbrack	468	Corkaguiny	Kinard	Dingle												
Bohereens	106	Magunihy	Molahiffe	Killarney												
Boherroe	368	Clanmaurice	O'Dorney	Tralee												
Bollasallagh	303	Magunihy	Aglish	Killarney												
Bolus	425	Iveragh	Killemlagh	Cahersiveen												
Boola	127	Iveragh	Caher	Cahersiveen												
Boolacullane	668	Magunihy	Molahiffe	Killarney												
Boolakeel	191	Iveragh	Prior	Cahersiveen												
Boolananave	416	Dunkerron South	Kilcrohane	Kenmare												
Booleenshare	545	Clanmaurice	Ballyheige	Tralee												
Boolteens East	917	Trughanacmy	Kilgarrylander	Tralee												
Boolteens West	1,086	Trughanacmy	Kilgarrylander	Tralee												
Boulanimrish	140	Magunihy	Kilbonane	Killarney												
Boulerdah	479	Iveragh	Killinane	Cahersiveen												
Brackaharagh	514	Dunkerron South	Kilcrohane	Cahersiveen												
Brackhill	536	Trughanacmy	Kilcolman	Killarney												
Brackloon	754	Corkaguiny	Ballynacourty	Dingle												
Brackloon	615	Dunkerron South	Kilcrohane	Kenmare												
Brandonwell	457	Clanmaurice	Ardfert	Tralee												
Braumaddra	379	Clanmaurice	Kilfeighny	Listowel												
Bray	823	Iveragh	Valencia	Cahersiveen												
Breahig	804	Trughanacmy	Ballincuslane	Tralee												
Breahig	208	Iveragh	Dromod	Cahersiveen												
Breanlee	1,166	Dunkerron North	Killorglin	Cahersiveen												
Breanshagh	138	Magunihy	Molahiffe	Killarney												
Brewsterfield	216	Magunihy	Killaha	Killarney												
Brickeen Island	19	Magunihy	Killarney	Killarney												
Bridia	327	Dunkerron North	Knockane	Killarney												
Bromore East	192	Iraghticonnor	Kilconly	Listowel												
Bromore West	267	Iraghticonnor	Kilconly	Listowel												
Brookhill	331	Dunkerron North	Knockane	Killarney												
**Brosna**	Town	Trughanacmy	Brosna	Tralee												
Brosna East	616	Trughanacmy	Brosna	Tralee												
Brosna West	804	Trughanacmy	Brosna	Tralee												
Broughane	742	Trughanacmy	Castleisland	Tralee												
Brown Island (or Rabbit Island)	12	Magunihy	Aghadoe	Killarney												
Buddaghauns	507	Magunihy	Kilcummin	Killarney												
Bunaderreen	703	Iveragh	Dromod	Cahersiveen												
Bunagarha	833	Iraghticonnor	Listowel	Listowel												
Bunbinnia	1,546	Dunkerron North	Knockane	Killarney												
Buncurrig	505	Clanmaurice	Ballyheige	Tralee												
Bunglasha	216	Clanmaurice	Duagh	Listowel												
Bunglasha North	249	Iveragh	Glanbehy	Cahersiveen												
Bunglasha South	341	Iveragh	Glanbehy	Cahersiveen												
Bunnaruddee	315	Iraghticonnor	Aghavallen	Listowel												
Bunrower	197	Magunihy	Aghadoe	Killarney												
Buntalloon	33	Trughanacmy	Tralee	Tralee												
Burnham East	135	Corkaguiny	Dingle	Dingle												
Burnham West	95	Corkaguiny	Dingle	Dingle												
Bushmount	276	Magunihy	Molahiffe	Killarney												
Caher	427	Glanarought	Kilgarvan	Kenmare												
Caher	178	Magunihy	Aghadoe	Killarney												
Caher	109	Corkaguiny	Killiney	Dingle												
Caher East	483	Glanarought	Kenmare	Kenmare												
Caher West	234	Glanarought	Kenmare	Kenmare												
Caheracruttera	574	Corkaguiny	Ballinvoher	Dingle												
Caheragh	435	Trughanacmy	Castleisland	Tralee												
Caherard	199	Corkaguiny	Kildrum	Dingle												
Caheratrant	297	Corkaguiny	Ventry	Dingle												
Caherbarnagh	295	Iveragh	Dromod	Cahersiveen												
Caherboshina	444	Corkaguiny	Kildrum	Dingle												
Caherbreagh	387	Trughanacmy	Ballymacelligott	Tralee												
Caherbullig	323	Corkaguiny	Ventry	Dingle												
Cahercullenagh Lower	283	Trughanacmy	Ballymacelligott	Tralee												
Cahercullenagh Upper	520	Trughanacmy	Ballymacelligott	Tralee												
Caherdaniel	452	Dunkerron South	Kilcrohane	Cahersiveen												
Caherdean	243	Magunihy	Kilcredane	Killarney												
Caherdorgan North	216	Corkaguiny	Kilmalkedar	Dingle												
Caherdorgan South	105	Corkaguiny	Kilmalkedar	Dingle												
Cahereen East	8	Trughanacmy	Castleisland	Tralee												
Cahereen West	109	Trughanacmy	Castleisland	Tralee												
Cahereighterrush	277	Iveragh	Killinane	Cahersiveen												
Caherfealane	1,038	Trughanacmy	Kilgarrylander	Tralee												
Caherfealane-marsh	64	Trughanacmy	Kilgarrylander	Tralee												
Caherleheen	826	Trughanacmy	Ratass	Tralee												
Caherleheen	64	Trughanacmy	Ballyseedy	Tralee												
Caherlehillan	709	Iveragh	Killinane	Cahersiveen												
Cahermoneen	28	Trughanacmy	Tralee	Tralee												
Cahermore	89	Trughanacmy	Ballymacelligott	Tralee												
Cahernabane	476	Dunkerron South	Knockane	Killarney												
Cahernaduv	131	Dunkerron South	Knockane	Killarney												
Cahernageeha	355	Dunkerron South	Kilcrohane	Cahersiveen												
Cahernaman	503	Iveragh	Killinane	Cahersiveen												
Cahernane	188	Magunihy	Killarney	Killarney												
Cahernane	75	Magunihy	Aghadoe	Killarney												
Cahernead	131	Clanmaurice	Killahan	Tralee												
Caherpierce	503	Corkaguiny	Ballinvoher	Dingle												
Caherquin	164	Corkaguiny	Dunurlin	Dingle												
Cahersavane	621	Iveragh	Dromod	Cahersiveen												
Caherscullibeen	322	Corkaguiny	Kilmalkedar	Dingle												
**Cahersiveen**	Town	Iveragh	Caher	Cahersiveen												
Cahersiveen	255	Iveragh	Caher	Cahersiveen												
Caherslee	40	Trughanacmy	Tralee	Tralee												
Caherulla	557	Clanmaurice	Ballyheige	Tralee												
Caherweesheen	137	Trughanacmy	Annagh	Tralee												
Callahaniska	394	Iveragh	Glanbehy	Killarney												
Callanafersy East	848	Trughanacmy	Kilcolman	Killarney												
Callanafersy West	779	Trughanacmy	Kilcolman	Killarney												
Camp	356	Trughanacmy	Castleisland	Tralee												
Camp	226	Corkaguiny	Kilgobban	Tralee												
Camp	160	Trughanacmy	Ratass	Tralee												
Camp East	109	Trughanacmy	Castleisland	Tralee												
Canagullen	555	Glanarought	Tuosist	Kenmare												
Canburrin	1,293	Iveragh	Caher	Cahersiveen												
Canearagh	949	Iveragh	Glanbehy	Cahersiveen												
Canfee	195	Glanarought	Tuosist	Kenmare												
Cangullia	789	Trughanacmy	Castleisland	Tralee												
Canknoogheda	359	Dunkerron North	Knockane	Cahersiveen												
Cantra	145	Corkaguiny	Ventry	Dingle												
Canuig	1,267	Iveragh	Dromod	Cahersiveen												
Canuig	450	Iveragh	Prior	Cahersiveen												
Cappa	38	Corkaguiny	Dingle	Dingle												
Cappa	371	Dunkerron South	Templenoe	Kenmare												
Cappaclogh East	220	Corkaguiny	Kilgobban	Tralee												
Cappaclogh West	214	Corkaguiny	Kilgobban	Tralee												
Cappaganneen	496	Dunkerron North	Knockane	Killarney												
Cappagh	1,253	Magunihy	Killaha	Killarney												
Cappagh	720	Iveragh	Killinane	Cahersiveen												
Cappagh	518	Clanmaurice	Kilflyn	Tralee												
Cappagh	383	Glanarought	Kenmare	Kenmare												
Cappagh	248	Dunkerron North	Knockane	Killarney												
Cappagh	190	Corkaguiny	Cloghane	Dingle												
Cappagh	110	Dunkerron North	Killorglin	Killarney												
Cappamore	636	Glanarought	Kenmare	Kenmare												
Cappamore	273	Dunkerron South	Kilcrohane	Cahersiveen												
Cappamore	225	Iveragh	Killinane	Cahersiveen												
Cappamore	79	Dunkerron North	Knockane	Cahersiveen												
Cappanacush East	684	Dunkerron South	Templenoe	Kenmare												
Cappanacush Island	19	Dunkerron South	Templenoe	Kenmare												
Cappanacush West	495	Dunkerron South	Templenoe	Kenmare												
Cappanagroun	558	Iveragh	Dromod	Cahersiveen												
Cappananee	101	Corkaguiny	Killiney	Dingle												
Cappanlivane	265	Glanarought	Kilgarvan	Kenmare												
Cappanthlarrig	310	Dunkerron North	Knockane	Killarney												
Capparoe	385	Dunkerron South	Templenoe	Kenmare												
Capparoe	325	Dunkerron North	Knockane	Killarney												
Cappateige	492	Corkaguiny	Stradbally	Dingle												
Cappawee	308	Iveragh	Killemlagh	Cahersiveen												
Cappyantanvally	317	Dunkerron North	Knockane	Cahersiveen												
Carhan Lower	200	Iveragh	Caher	Cahersiveen												
Carhan Upper	553	Iveragh	Caher	Cahersiveen												
Carhoo East	158	Corkaguiny	Dingle	Dingle												
Carhoo West	181	Corkaguiny	Dingle	Dingle												
Carhoobeg	225	Dunkerron North	Knockane	Killarney												
Carhooearagh	1,370	Iraghticonnor	Knockanure	Listowel												
Carhoomeengar East	223	Glanarought	Kenmare	Kenmare												
Carhoomeengar West	249	Glanarought	Kenmare	Kenmare												
Carhoona	593	Iraghticonnor	Kilnaughtin	Glin												
Carhoonahone	805	Dunkerron North	Knockane	Killarney												
Carhoonakilla	161	Iraghticonnor	Kilnaughtin	Glin												
Carhoonakineely	316	Iraghticonnor	Kilnaughtin	Glin												
Carhoonaknock East	103	Iraghticonnor	Galey	Listowel												
Carhoonaknock West	89	Iraghticonnor	Galey	Listowel												
Carhoonaphuca	163	Corkaguiny	Kildrum	Dingle												
Carhoonoe	305	Magunihy	Nohavaldaly	Killarney												
Carker	938	Trughanacmy	Ballincuslane	Tralee												
Carks	447	Glanarought	Tuosist	Kenmare												
Carrahane Lower	1,008	Clanmaurice	Ardfert	Tralee												
Carrahane Upper	156	Clanmaurice	Ardfert	Tralee												
Carran	394	Magunihy	Kilcummin	Killarney												
Carrig	151	Corkaguiny	Kilmalkedar	Dingle												
Carrig East	1,013	Dunkerron South	Templenoe	Kenmare												
Carrig Island	231	Iraghticonnor	Aghavallen	Listowel												
Carrig West	699	Dunkerron South	Templenoe	Kenmare												
Carrigadav	984	Corkaguiny	Killiney	Dingle												
Carrigafoyle	221	Iraghticonnor	Aghavallen	Listowel												
Carrigafreaghane	79	Magunihy	Killarney	Killarney												
Carrigaha	155	Corkaguiny	Killiney	Dingle												
Carrigane	198	Iraghticonnor	Aghavallen	Listowel												
Carrigaveema	299	Magunihy	Killaha	Killarney												
Carrigawannia	241	Magunihy	Killaha	Killarney												
Carrigcannon	962	Clanmaurice	Kilfeighny	Listowel												
Carrigeen	301	Trughanacmy	Brosna	Tralee												
Carrigeencullia	1,485	Magunihy	Killarney	Killarney												
Carrigeendaniel	106	Trughanacmy	Tralee	Tralee												
Carrigeenwood	393	Trughanacmy	Brosna	Tralee												
Carriginane	770	Iveragh	Glanbehy	Cahersiveen												
Carrignafeela	108	Trughanacmy	O'Brennan	Tralee												
Carrignafeela	81	Trughanacmy	Ballymacelligott	Tralee												
Carrignahihilan	119	Glanarought	Kenmare	Kenmare												
Cashelagh	801	Iveragh	Dromod	Cahersiveen												
Cashelkeelty	595	Glanarought	Tuosist	Kenmare												
**Castle Island**	Town	Trughanacmy	Castleisland	Tralee												
Castleconway	91	Trughanacmy	Killorglin	Killarney												
Castledrum	707	Trughanacmy	Kilgarrylander	Tralee												
Castlefarm	258	Magunihy	Molahiffe	Killarney												
**Castlegregory**	Town	Corkaguiny	Killiney	Dingle												
Castlegregory	250	Corkaguiny	Killiney	Dingle												
Castlelough	125	Magunihy	Killarney	Killarney												
**Castlemaine**	Town	Trughanacmy	Kiltallagh	Tralee												
Castlemaine	9	Trughanacmy	Kiltallagh	Tralee												
Castlemaine	9	Trughanacmy	Kiltallagh	Tralee												
Castlequarter	189	Iraghticonnor	Kilconly	Listowel												
Castlequin	1,192	Iveragh	Caher	Cahersiveen												
Castleshannon	386	Clanmaurice	Killury	Listowel												
Castleshannon	238	Clanmaurice	Ballyheige	Tralee												
Castletown	197	Clanmaurice	Kilflyn	Listowel												
Castleview	35	Trughanacmy	Castleisland	Tralee												
Caunteens	710	Dunkerron South	Kilcrohane	Cahersiveen												
**Causeway**	Town	Clanmaurice	Killury	Listowel												
Chapel Quarter	7	Trughanacmy	Castleisland	Tralee												
**Chapeltown**	Town	Iveragh	Valencia	Cahersiveen												
Churchfield	100	Corkaguiny	Kinard	Dingle												
Churchground	641	Glanarought	Kilgarvan	Kenmare												
Churchtown	294	Dunkerron North	Knockane	Killarney												
Claddanure East	373	Dunkerron South	Templenoe	Kenmare												
Claddanure West	349	Dunkerron South	Templenoe	Kenmare												
Clahane	2,170	Trughanacmy	Annagh	Tralee												
Clash	225	Magunihy	Killarney	Killarney												
Clash	219	Corkaguiny	Kilquane	Dingle												
Clash East	170	Trughanacmy	Ratass	Tralee												
Clash Island	3	Trughanacmy	Killorglin	Killarney												
Clash West	64	Trughanacmy	Ratass	Tralee												
Clashaphuca	85	Trughanacmy	Clogherbrien	Tralee												
Clashatlea	335	Trughanacmy	Ballymacelligott	Tralee												
Clashedmond	186	Trughanacmy	Ballyseedy	Tralee												
Clasheen	244	Magunihy	Killarney	Killarney												
Clashganniv	512	Trughanacmy	Dysert	Tralee												
Clashmelcon	958	Clanmaurice	Killury	Listowel												
Clashnagarrane	479	Magunihy	Kilcummin	Killarney												
Cleanderry	638	Clanmaurice	Killury	Listowel												
Cleedagh	60	Magunihy	Kilcummin	Killarney												
Cleeny	89	Magunihy	Aghadoe	Killarney												
Cliddaun	172	Trughanacmy	Killeentierna	Listowel												
Cliddaun	73	Corkaguiny	Dingle	Dingle												
Clievragh	331	Iraghticonnor	Listowel	Listowel												
Clodragh	276	Iveragh	Dromod	Cahersiveen												
**Cloghane**	Town	Corkaguiny	Cloghane	Dingle												
Cloghane	1,007	Corkaguiny	Cloghane	Dingle												
Cloghane	481	Clanmaurice	Killury	Listowel												
Cloghane	353	Magunihy	Killaha	Killarney												
Cloghane	143	Iveragh	Killinane	Cahersiveen												
Cloghane	141	Corkaguiny	Kildrum	Dingle												
Cloghaneanode	535	Corkaguiny	Killiney	Dingle												
Cloghaneanua	566	Iveragh	Prior	Cahersiveen												
Cloghanebane	171	Clanmaurice	Ballyheige	Tralee												
Cloghanecanuig	132	Iveragh	Killemlagh	Cahersiveen												
Cloghanecarhan	1,039	Iveragh	Caher	Cahersiveen												
Cloghaneduff	208	Corkaguiny	Kilmalkedar	Dingle												
Cloghaneleesh	300	Clanmaurice	Ballyheige	Tralee												
Cloghaneleskirt	875	Clanmaurice	Kilflyn	Tralee												
Cloghanelinaghan	1,169	Iveragh	Caher	Cahersiveen												
Cloghanenagleragh	577	Clanmaurice	Kilfeighny	Listowel												
Cloghanesheskeen	165	Corkaguiny	Killiney	Dingle												
Clogharee	1,026	Corkaguiny	Cloghane	Dingle												
Cloghavoola	130	Trughanacmy	Ballymacelligott	Tralee												
Cloghboola	686	Clanmaurice	Kilshenane	Listowel												
Clogher	368	Corkaguiny	Dunurlin	Dingle												
Clogher	296	Clanmaurice	Kiltomy	Listowel												
Clogher	156	Clanmaurice	Kilmoyly	Tralee												
Clogher	41	Trughanacmy	Ballymacelligott	Tralee												
Cloghera Beg	885	Dunkerron North	Knockane	Cahersiveen												
Cloghera More	794	Dunkerron North	Knockane	Kenmare												
Clogherane	699	Glanarought	Tuosist	Kenmare												
Clogherbrien	318	Trughanacmy	Clogherbrien	Tralee												
Clogherclemin	204	Trughanacmy	Ballymacelligott	Tralee												
Cloghereen Lower	256	Magunihy	Killarney	Killarney												
Cloghereen Upper	270	Magunihy	Killarney	Killarney												
Cloghermore	62	Trughanacmy	Ballymacelligott	Tralee												
Cloghernoosh	1,149	Dunkerron North	Knockane	Killarney												
Cloghers	192	Trughanacmy	Annagh	Tralee												
Cloghfune	265	Dunkerron North	Knockane	Cahersiveen												
Cloghfune	242	Magunihy	Killarney	Killarney												
Cloghleagh	119	Trughanacmy	Kiltallagh	Tralee												
Cloghmackirkeen	251	Trughanacmy	Clogherbrien	Tralee												
Cloghvoola	1,733	Iveragh	Dromod	Cahersiveen												
Clondouglas	292	Clanmaurice	Kilfeighny	Listowel												
Cloon	338	Iveragh	Prior	Cahersiveen												
Cloon Berg	71	Trughanacmy	Ratass	Tralee												
Cloon East	1,003	Dunkerron North	Knockane	Cahersiveen												
Cloon Glebe	94	Clanmaurice	Ardfert	Tralee												
Cloon Island	3	Trughanacmy	Killorglin	Killarney												
Cloon More	99	Trughanacmy	Ratass	Tralee												
Cloon West	1,807	Dunkerron North	Knockane	Cahersiveen												
Cloonacurrig	153	Trughanacmy	Dysert	Tralee												
Cloonaghlin	1,428	Iveragh	Dromod	Cahersiveen												
Cloonalassan	154	Trughanacmy	Kiltallagh	Tralee												
Cloonalour	144	Trughanacmy	Ratass	Tralee												
Cloonalour	85	Trughanacmy	Tralee	Tralee												
Cloonaman	819	Iraghticonnor	Aghavallen	Listowel												
Cloonametagh	216	Clanmaurice	O'Dorney	Tralee												
Cloonanorig	25	Trughanacmy	Tralee	Tralee												
Cloonbeg	101	Corkaguiny	Killiney	Dingle												
Cloonbrane	315	Iraghticonnor	Murher	Listowel												
Clooncarrig	76	Trughanacmy	Killorglin	Killarney												
Cloonclogh	244	Trughanacmy	Killeentierna	Killarney												
Clooncolla	168	Clanmaurice	Dysert	Listowel												
Clooncreestane	38	Clanmaurice	Kilmoyly	Tralee												
Clooncurra	194	Corkaguiny	Kinard	Dingle												
Clooneagh	20	Clanmaurice	Rattoo	Listowel												
Cloonearagh	89	Trughanacmy	Kilgarrylander	Tralee												
Cloonee	700	Glanarought	Tuosist	Kenmare												
Clooneen	160	Clanmaurice	Killahan	Listowel												
Cloonkeen	707	Magunihy	Killaha	Killarney												
Cloonlara	174	Magunihy	Molahiffe	Killarney												
Cloonlogher	161	Clanmaurice	Rattoo	Listowel												
Cloonmackon	387	Iraghticonnor	Listowel	Listowel												
Cloonmealane	264	Magunihy	Kilnanare	Killarney												
Cloonmore	337	Trughanacmy	Kilcolman	Killarney												
Cloonnafinneela	745	Clanmaurice	Kilflyn	Tralee												
Cloonprohus	249	Iraghticonnor	Murher	Listowel												
Cloonsharragh	498	Corkaguiny	Cloghane	Dingle												
Cloonsillagh	69	Clanmaurice	Kiltomy	Listowel												
Cloonsquire	96	Corkaguiny	Killiney	Dingle												
Cloontarriv	361	Trughanacmy	Nohaval	Tralee												
Cloonteens	155	Magunihy	Kilcummin	Killarney												
Cloonties	228	Corkaguiny	Dunurlin	Dingle												
Cloonts	466	Magunihy	Nohavaldaly	Killarney												
Cloontubbrid North	250	Iraghticonnor	Listowel	Listowel												
Cloontubbrid South	281	Iraghticonnor	Listowel	Listowel												
Cloonydonigan Lower	93	Magunihy	Kilcredane	Killarney												
Cloonydonigan Upper	198	Magunihy	Kilcredane	Killarney												
Cloosmore	115	Corkaguiny	Dingle	Dingle												
Clydagh	105	Dunkerron North	Knockane	Killarney												
Clydaghroe	1,286	Magunihy	Killaha	Killarney												
Coad	641	Dunkerron South	Kilcrohane	Cahersiveen												
Coarha Beg	920	Iveragh	Valencia	Cahersiveen												
Coarha More	832	Iveragh	Valencia	Cahersiveen												
Coars	543	Iveragh	Killinane	Cahersiveen												
Cockhill	172	Iraghticonnor	Kilnaughtin	Glin												
Cockow	389	Dunkerron North	Knockane	Killarney												
Collegefield	25	Clanmaurice	Ardfert	Tralee												
Collorus	474	Glanarought	Tuosist	Kenmare												
Commanes	544	Iveragh	Dromod	Cahersiveen												
Commaun	561	Iveragh	Glanbehy	Killarney												
Commons	219	Corkaguiny	Kilgobban	Tralee												
Commons	106	Clanmaurice	Kilmoyly	Tralee												
Commons	10	Magunihy	Kilbonane	Killarney												
Commons East	176	Clanmaurice	Ardfert	Tralee												
Commons North	359	Corkaguiny	Dunquin	Dingle												
Commons North	111	Clanmaurice	Ardfert	Tralee												
Commons of Dingle	876	Corkaguiny	Dunquin	Dingle												
Commons of Milltown	58	Corkaguiny	Dunquin	Dingle												
Commons South	281	Corkaguiny	Dunquin	Dingle												
Commons West	61	Clanmaurice	Ardfert	Tralee												
Connigar	238	Magunihy	Molahiffe	Killarney												
Cool	336	Corkaguiny	Kilgobban	Tralee												
Cool East	364	Iveragh	Valencia	Cahersiveen												
Cool West	272	Iveragh	Valencia	Cahersiveen												
Coolaclarig	665	Iraghticonnor	Listowel	Listowel												
Coolagowan	268	Iraghticonnor	Dysert	Listowel												
Coolanaroo	155	Glanarought	Tuosist	Kenmare												
Coolaneelig	405	Clanmaurice	Duagh	Listowel												
Coolard	363	Iraghticonnor	Galey	Listowel												
Coolaruane	257	Clanmaurice	Kiltomy	Listowel												
Coolatoosane	232	Iraghticonnor	Listowel	Listowel												
Coolavanny	163	Trughanacmy	Castleisland	Tralee												
Coolavorheen	107	Magunihy	Kilbonane	Killarney												
Coolbane	217	Magunihy	Kilbonane	Killarney												
Coolbane East	262	Magunihy	Killorglin	Killarney												
Coolbane East	12	Magunihy	Kilbonane	Killarney												
Coolbane West	129	Magunihy	Killorglin	Killarney												
Coolbane West	15	Magunihy	Kilbonane	Killarney												
Coolbaun	173	Magunihy	Kilcummin	Killarney												
Coolbaun	109	Magunihy	Kilcredane	Killarney												
Coolbeha	187	Iraghticonnor	Galey	Listowel												
Coolcaslagh	455	Magunihy	Killarney	Killarney												
Coolclieve	174	Magunihy	Killarney	Killarney												
Coolclogher	119	Magunihy	Killarney	Killarney												
Coolcorcoran	289	Magunihy	Aghadoe	Killarney												
Coolcreen	739	Glanarought	Tuosist	Kenmare												
Coolcummisk	644	Dunkerron North	Knockane	Killarney												
Coolcurtoga	761	Magunihy	Killaha	Killarney												
Cooleanig	461	Dunkerron North	Knockane	Killarney												
Coolgarriv	224	Magunihy	Aghadoe	Killarney												
Coolgarriv	95	Trughanacmy	Nohaval	Tralee												
Coolies	2,254	Magunihy	Killarney	Killarney												
Coolkeragh	1,437	Iraghticonnor	Galey	Listowel												
Coolknoohill	1,128	Glanarought	Kilgarvan	Kenmare												
Coollegrean	1,246	Trughanacmy	Ballincuslane	Tralee												
Coollegrean	56	Magunihy	Killarney	Killarney												
Coollick	830	Magunihy	Kilcummin	Killarney												
Coollick	168	Magunihy	Kilcredane	Killarney												
Coolmagort	653	Dunkerron North	Knockane	Killarney												
Coolnacalliagh	229	Trughanacmy	Killeentierna	Killarney												
Coolnadead	124	Trughanacmy	Ballymacelligott	Tralee												
Coolnagarrahy	53	Magunihy	Kilcummin	Killarney												
Coolnageragh	536	Trughanacmy	Castleisland	Tralee												
Coolnagoppoge	757	Glanarought	Kilcaskan	Kenmare												
Coolnagoppoge	466	Glanarought	Kilgarvan	Kenmare												
Coolnagoppoge	434	Corkaguiny	Ballynacourty	Dingle												
Coolnagraigue	292	Iraghticonnor	Aghavallen	Listowel												
Coolnaharragill Lower	137	Iveragh	Glanbehy	Cahersiveen												
Coolnaharragill Upper	420	Iveragh	Glanbehy	Cahersiveen												
Coolnalaght	111	Iraghticonnor	Listowel	Listowel												
Coolnaleen Lower	229	Clanmaurice	Kilshenane	Listowel												
Coolnaleen Upper	269	Clanmaurice	Kilshenane	Listowel												
Coolnanoonagh	178	Iraghticonnor	Kilnaughtin	Glin												
Coologes	994	Glanarought	Kilgarvan	Kenmare												
Coolownig	165	Glanarought	Tuosist	Kenmare												
Coolroe	1,068	Dunkerron North	Knockane	Killarney												
Coolroe	109	Corkaguiny	Killiney	Dingle												
Coolroe East	323	Magunihy	Aglish	Killarney												
Coolroe Lower	242	Iveragh	Glanbehy	Cahersiveen												
Coolroe North	256	Magunihy	Kilbonane	Killarney												
Coolroe South	275	Magunihy	Kilbonane	Killarney												
Coolroe Upper	506	Iveragh	Glanbehy	Cahersiveen												
Coolroe West	110	Magunihy	Aglish	Killarney												
Cools	726	Iveragh	Prior	Cahersiveen												
Cools	375	Magunihy	Aghadoe	Killarney												
Coolvackagh	57	Clanmaurice	Duagh	Listowel												
Coom	1,799	Trughanacmy	Ballincuslane	Tralee												
Coom	954	Magunihy	Kilcummin	Killarney												
Coom	258	Iveragh	Prior	Cahersiveen												
Coomabaha	838	Iveragh	Dromod	Cahersiveen												
Coomacullen	1,076	Magunihy	Killaha	Killarney												
Coomakeogh	168	Iveragh	Killemlagh	Cahersiveen												
Coomanaspig	256	Iveragh	Killemlagh	Cahersiveen												
Coomasaharn	1,081	Iveragh	Glanbehy	Cahersiveen												
Coomaspeara	1,212	Iveragh	Dromod	Cahersiveen												
Coomastow	701	Iveragh	Dromod	Cahersiveen												
Coomatloukane	622	Dunkerron South	Kilcrohane	Cahersiveen												
Coomavanniha and Dughile	1,195	Iveragh	Dromod	Cahersiveen												
Coomavoher	1,476	Iveragh	Dromod	Cahersiveen												
Coomavoon	624	Iveragh	Glanbehy	Cahersiveen												
Coomcallee	1,549	Dunkerron North	Knockane	Killarney												
Coomclogherane	478	Glanarought	Kilgarvan	Kenmare												
Coomdeeween	258	Iveragh	Killinane	Cahersiveen												
Coomduff	81	Iveragh	Killinane	Cahersiveen												
Coomlamminy	1,402	Dunkerron South	Templenoe	Kenmare												
Coomleagh	867	Iveragh	Dromod	Cahersiveen												
Coomlettra	421	Dunkerron North	Knockane	Cahersiveen												
Coomnafanida	364	Iveragh	Killorglin	Killarney												
Coomnahincha	299	Iveragh	Killinane	Cahersiveen												
Coomnahorna East	710	Dunkerron South	Kilcrohane	Cahersiveen												
Coomnahorna West	326	Dunkerron South	Kilcrohane	Cahersiveen												
Coomnakilla North	492	Dunkerron South	Templenoe	Kenmare												
Coomnakilla South	645	Dunkerron South	Templenoe	Kenmare												
Coomshanna	1,024	Iveragh	Killinane	Cahersiveen												
Coomura	356	Iveragh	Dromod	Cahersiveen												
Coomyanna	1,067	Dunkerron South	Kilcrohane	Kenmare												
Cooracoosane	574	Dunkerron South	Templenoe	Kenmare												
Cooragweanish	238	Glanarought	Kenmare	Kenmare												
Coorleagh	1,198	Glanarought	Kilcaskan	Kenmare												
Coornacaragh	326	Glanarought	Tuosist	Kenmare												
Coornagillagh	213	Glanarought	Tuosist	Kenmare												
Coornagrena and Goulnacappy	816	Dunkerron North	Killorglin	Cahersiveen												
Coornameana	233	Dunkerron North	Killorglin	Cahersiveen												
Cooryeen	629	Glanarought	Tuosist	Kenmare												
Cooryvanaheen	97	Iveragh	Dromod	Cahersiveen												
Coracow	85	Magunihy	Killaha	Killarney												
Corbally	400	Magunihy	Killorglin	Killarney												
Corbally	170	Clanmaurice	Rattoo	Listowel												
Corbally	115	Magunihy	Molahiffe	Killarney												
Corcas and Sandhills	125	Iraghticonnor	Kilconly	Listowel												
Cordal East	1,886	Trughanacmy	Ballincuslane	Tralee												
Cordal West	1,219	Trughanacmy	Ballincuslane	Tralee												
Cores	1,434	Magunihy	Killarney	Killarney												
Corkaboy	154	Trughanacmy	Kilgarrylander	Tralee												
Cosha North	213	Iveragh	Glanbehy	Killarney												
Cosha South	270	Iveragh	Glanbehy	Cahersiveen												
Coshcummeragh	347	Iveragh	Dromod	Cahersiveen												
Coss	608	Dunkerron North	Knockane	Cahersiveen												
Cottage	331	Magunihy	Nohavaldaly	Killarney												
Coulagh	1,000	Iveragh	Killinane	Cahersiveen												
Coumaleague	255	Corkaguiny	Ventry	Dingle												
Coumanare	776	Corkaguiny	Ballyduff	Dingle												
Coumbowler	430	Corkaguiny	Garfinny	Dingle												
Coumduff	2,093	Corkaguiny	Ballynacourty	Dingle												
Coumeenoole North	335	Corkaguiny	Dunquin	Dingle												
Coumeenoole South	261	Corkaguiny	Dunquin	Dingle												
Coumeenycorraun	375	Corkaguiny	Cloghane	Dingle												
Coumgagh	75	Corkaguiny	Kilmalkedar	Dingle												
Coumlanders	49	Corkaguiny	Kinard	Dingle												
Coumreagh	265	Dunkerron North	Knockane	Killarney												
Cow Island	2	Magunihy	Killarney	Killarney												
Crag	324	Trughanacmy	Currans	Killarney												
Crag	282	Trughanacmy	Castleisland	Tralee												
Crag	243	Trughanacmy	Nohaval	Tralee												
Crag	156	Trughanacmy	O'Brennan	Tralee												
Craggane	233	Clanmaurice	Duagh	Listowel												
Craggaunmoonia	99	Trughanacmy	Ballincuslane	Tralee												
Creegooane	26	Clanmaurice	Ardfert	Tralee												
Creeveen	916	Iveragh	Glanbehy	Cahersiveen												
Creeveen	567	Glanarought	Tuosist	Kenmare												
Creggeen	486	Glanarought	Kilgarvan	Kenmare												
Crinagort	629	Glanarought	Kilcaskan	Kenmare												
Crinnagh	571	Magunihy	Killarney	Killarney												
Crinny East	292	Trughanacmy	Castleisland	Tralee												
Crinny West	284	Trughanacmy	Castleisland	Tralee												
Crohane	1,845	Magunihy	Killaha	Killarney												
Crohane	466	Magunihy	Aghadoe	Killarney												
Cromane Lower	517	Trughanacmy	Killorglin	Killarney												
Cromane Upper	879	Trughanacmy	Killorglin	Killarney												
Croogorts	23	Trughanacmy	Tralee	Tralee												
Crossderry	830	Dunkerron North	Knockane	Killarney												
Crosstown	145	Magunihy	Killaha	Killarney												
Crotta	399	Clanmaurice	Kilflyn	Listowel												
Crotta	62	Clanmaurice	Kilfeighny	Listowel												
Cuhig	589	Glanarought	Tuosist	Kenmare												
Culleeny Beg	116	Magunihy	Kilbonane	Killarney												
Culleeny More	348	Magunihy	Kilbonane	Killarney												
Cullenagh	177	Corkaguiny	Dingle	Dingle												
Cullenagh Lower	175	Dunkerron North	Knockane	Killarney												
Cullenagh Upper	513	Dunkerron North	Knockane	Killarney												
Cullinagh	598	Dunkerron North	Aghadoe	Killarney												
Cummeen	435	Glanarought	Tuosist	Kenmare												
Cummeen Lower	183	Glanarought	Kilgarvan	Kenmare												
Cummeen Upper	899	Glanarought	Kilgarvan	Kenmare												
Cummeenavrick	1,151	Magunihy	Killaha	Killarney												
Cummeenboy	765	Glanarought	Kenmare	Kenmare												
Cummeenduvasig	931	Glanarought	Kilgarvan	Kenmare												
Cummeengeera	466	Glanarought	Tuosist	Kenmare												
Cummeennabuddoge	1,499	Magunihy	Killaha	Killarney												
Cummeenshrule	718	Glanarought	Kilcaskan	Kenmare												
Cummers East	389	Glanarought	Tuosist	Kenmare												
Cummers West	229	Glanarought	Tuosist	Kenmare												
Cunnagare	205	Clanmaurice	Kilcaragh	Listowel												
Cunnavoola	131	Trughanacmy	Kiltallagh	Tralee												
Curra	257	Iveragh	Glanbehy	Cahersiveen												
Currabanefield	201	Trughanacmy	Killeentierna	Killarney												
Currabeg	452	Glanarought	Kenmare	Kenmare												
Curracitty	310	Trughanacmy	Killeentierna	Killarney												
Curracullenagh	866	Corkaguiny	Kilgobban	Tralee												
Curraduff	160	Corkaguiny	Kilgobban	Tralee												
Curraflugh	144	Dunkerron North	Knockane	Cahersiveen												
Curragh	305	Magunihy	Aghadoe	Killarney												
Curragh Beg	356	Dunkerron North	Knockane	Cahersiveen												
Curragh More	1,282	Dunkerron North	Knockane	Killarney												
Curraghatoosane	296	Iraghticonnor	Listowel	Listowel												
Curraghatouk	153	Clanmaurice	Duagh	Listowel												
Curraghcroneen	480	Clanmaurice	Dysert	Listowel												
Curraghderrig	523	Iraghticonnor	Aghavallen	Listowel												
Curraghleha East	56	Trughanacmy	Ratass	Tralee												
Curraghleha West	74	Trughanacmy	Ratass	Tralee												
Curraghmacdonagh	102	Trughanacmy	Ballyseedy	Tralee												
Curraghmacdonagh	25	Trughanacmy	Ballymacelligott	Tralee												
Curraghmore East	340	Trughanacmy	Currans	Killarney												
Curraghmore West	784	Trughanacmy	Currans	Killarney												
Curraghnanav	281	Iveragh	Prior	Cahersiveen												
Curraghweesha	196	Iraghticonnor	Lisselton	Listowel												
Curraglass	523	Magunihy	Killaha	Killarney												
Curraglass North	177	Glanarought	Kilgarvan	Kenmare												
Curraglass South	211	Glanarought	Kilgarvan	Kenmare												
Curragraigue	704	Trughanacmy	Annagh	Tralee												
Curragraigue	160	Glanarought	Kilcaskan	Kenmare												
Curragraigue	140	Corkaguiny	Kilquane	Dingle												
Curraheen	2,302	Trughanacmy	Annagh	Tralee												
Curraheen	657	Iveragh	Glanbehy	Cahersiveen												
Curraheen Little	60	Iveragh	Glanbehy	Cahersiveen												
Curraknockaun	102	Trughanacmy	Killeentierna	Killarney												
Curraross	496	Trughanacmy	Killeentierna	Killarney												
Currauly	193	Corkaguiny	Kilmalkedar	Dingle												
Curravaha	1,263	Iveragh	Glanbehy	Cahersiveen												
Curravogh North	257	Trughanacmy	Tralee	Tralee												
Curravogh South	262	Trughanacmy	Tralee	Tralee												
Curravoola	1,732	Iveragh	Dromod	Cahersiveen												
Curreal	484	Magunihy	Killaha	Killarney												
Cuss	148	Iraghticonnor	Murher	Listowel												
Cuss	130	Trughanacmy	Kiltallagh	Tralee												
Cutteen	46	Corkaguiny	Stradbally	Dingle												
Darrynane Beg	609	Dunkerron South	Kilcrohane	Cahersiveen												
Darrynane More	404	Dunkerron South	Kilcrohane	Cahersiveen												
Dawros	415	Glanarought	Tuosist	Kenmare												
Deelis	477	Glanarought	Tuosist	Kenmare												
Deelis	244	Corkaguiny	Killiney	Dingle												
Deelis	230	Glanarought	Kilcaskan	Kenmare												
Deelis	190	Iveragh	Killinane	Cahersiveen												
Deenish	122	Dunkerron South	Kilcrohane	Cahersiveen												
Deer Park	420	Magunihy	Killarney	Killarney												
Deerpark	277	Clanmaurice	Kilcaragh	Listowel												
Deerpark	138	Corkaguiny	Kinard	Dingle												
Deerpark	47	Corkaguiny	Minard	Dingle												
Deesert	250	Glanarought	Kilgarvan	Kenmare												
Demesne	174	Magunihy	Killarney	Killarney												
Derk	408	Clanmaurice	Duagh	Listowel												
Derra	496	Iraghticonnor	Kilconly	Listowel												
Derra	347	Trughanacmy	Brosna	Tralee												
Derra East	243	Iraghticonnor	Galey	Listowel												
Derra West	503	Iraghticonnor	Galey	Listowel												
Derreen	1,033	Trughanacmy	Ballincuslane	Tralee												
Derreen	642	Iveragh	Dromod	Cahersiveen												
Derreen	592	Iveragh	Caher	Cahersiveen												
Derreen	282	Glanarought	Tuosist	Kenmare												
Derreen	70	Magunihy	Killarney	Killarney												
Derreenacahill	447	Glanarought	Kenmare	Kenmare												
Derreenacalla	287	Glanarought	Tuosist	Kenmare												
Derreenaclough	496	Dunkerron South	Kilcrohane	Kenmare												
Derreenacullig	415	Magunihy	Killaha	Killarney												
Derreenafoyle	874	Dunkerron South	Kilcrohane	Kenmare												
Derreenanaryagh	1,228	Iveragh	Glanbehy	Cahersiveen												
Derreenatlooig	208	Glanarought	Tuosist	Kenmare												
Derreenauliff	926	Dunkerron South	Kilcrohane	Kenmare												
Derreenavurrig	1,269	Dunkerron South	Kilcrohane	Kenmare												
Derreendarragh	225	Dunkerron South	Templenoe	Kenmare												
Derreendrislagh	712	Dunkerron South	Kilcrohane	Kenmare												
Derreenfinlehid	843	Dunkerron South	Templenoe	Kenmare												
Derreengarrinshaugh	203	Glanarought	Tuosist	Kenmare												
Derreenmoria	100	Iveragh	Killinane	Cahersiveen												
Derreennageeha	880	Iveragh	Dromod	Cahersiveen												
Derreennagreer	585	Dunkerron South	Kilcrohane	Kenmare												
Derreennamuckla	541	Dunkerron South	Kilcrohane	Kenmare												
Derreensillagh	191	Dunkerron South	Kilcrohane	Kenmare												
Derreeny	501	Dunkerron South	Templenoe	Kenmare												
Derriana	327	Iveragh	Dromod	Cahersiveen												
Derrincullig	495	Glanarought	Kilgarvan	Kenmare												
Derrindaff	763	Clanmaurice	Duagh	Listowel												
Derrineden	1,150	Iveragh	Dromod	Cahersiveen												
Derrinknow	157	Glanarought	Tuosist	Kenmare												
Derry	459	Iraghticonnor	Listowel	Listowel												
Derry East	556	Dunkerron South	Kilcrohane	Kenmare												
Derry West	719	Dunkerron South	Kilcrohane	Kenmare												
Derryard	639	Dunkerron North	Knockane	Killarney												
Derrybanane	719	Magunihy	Killaha	Killarney												
Derrycarna	1,436	Dunkerron North	Knockane	Killarney												
Derryco	174	Clanmaurice	Rattoo	Listowel												
Derryconnery	401	Glanarought	Tuosist	Kenmare												
Derrycunihy	524	Magunihy	Killarney	Killarney												
Derrygarrane North	386	Dunkerron South	Templenoe	Kenmare												
Derrygarrane South	861	Dunkerron South	Templenoe	Kenmare												
Derrygarriv	544	Dunkerron North	Knockane	Killarney												
Derrygarriv	365	Glanarought	Kenmare	Kenmare												
Derrygorman	395	Corkaguiny	Ballinvoher	Dingle												
Derrygreenia	472	Glanarought	Tuosist	Kenmare												
Derrylahan	560	Glanarought	Kenmare	Kenmare												
Derrylahan	253	Dunkerron North	Knockane	Killarney												
Derrylea	262	Dunkerron North	Knockane	Killarney												
Derryleagh	1,916	Dunkerron South	Kilcrohane	Kenmare												
Derrylicka	574	Dunkerron South	Templenoe	Kenmare												
Derrylooscaunagh	619	Dunkerron North	Knockane	Killarney												
Derrylough	855	Glanarought	Tuosist	Kenmare												
Derrymaclavlode	988	Magunihy	Killaha	Killarney												
Derrymore	586	Iveragh	Killinane	Cahersiveen												
Derrymore East	2,707	Corkaguiny	Annagh	Tralee												
Derrymore West	1,371	Corkaguiny	Annagh	Tralee												
Derrynablaha	985	Dunkerron South	Templenoe	Kenmare												
Derrynablunnaga	75	Dunkerron South	Knockane	Killarney												
Derrynabrack	390	Glanarought	Tuosist	Kenmare												
Derrynacaheragh	684	Glanarought	Kenmare	Kenmare												
Derrynacoulagh	730	Glanarought	Kenmare	Kenmare												
Derrynafeana	1,174	Dunkerron North	Knockane	Cahersiveen												
Derrynafeana	986	Dunkerron North	Killorglin	Cahersiveen												
Derrynafinnia	839	Magunihy	Killaha	Killarney												
Derrynafunsha	338	Dunkerron South	Templenoe	Kenmare												
Derrynagree	1,155	Dunkerron South	Kilcrohane	Kenmare												
Derrynamucklagh	453	Glanarought	Tuosist	Kenmare												
Derrynid	231	Glanarought	Tuosist	Kenmare												
Derryquin	692	Dunkerron South	Kilcrohane	Kenmare												
Derryra Beg	34	Clanmaurice	Killury	Listowel												
Derryra More	23	Clanmaurice	Killury	Listowel												
Derryreag	1,138	Magunihy	Killaha	Killarney												
Derryrush	230	Glanarought	Tuosist	Kenmare												
Derrysallagh	483	Glanarought	Tuosist	Kenmare												
Derryvorahig	277	Glanarought	Tuosist	Kenmare												
Derryvrin	365	Clanmaurice	Kilcaragh	Listowel												
Dicksgrove	196	Trughanacmy	Dysert	Killarney												
**Dingle**	Town	Corkaguiny	Dingle	Dingle												
Dingle	15	Corkaguiny	Dingle	Dingle												
Dingle Commons of	876	Corkaguiny	Dingle	Dingle												
Dinish Island	34	Magunihy	Killarney	Killarney												
Dinish Island	25	Glanarought	Tuosist	Kenmare												
Dinneens	199	Clanmaurice	Kilmoyly	Tralee												
Dirtane	277	Clanmaurice	Ballyheige	Tralee												
Dohilla	221	Iveragh	Valencia	Cahersiveen												
Dooaghs	557	Iveragh	Killorglin	Killarney												
Dooaghs Commons	383	Iveragh	Killorglin	Killarney												
Doocarrig Beg	542	Magunihy	Kilcummin	Killarney												
Doocarrig More	685	Magunihy	Kilcummin	Killarney												
Doogary	1,804	Dunkerron North	Knockane	Killarney												
Doolahig	129	Iveragh	Killorglin	Killarney												
Doolaig North	210	Trughanacmy	Castleisland	Tralee												
Doolaig South	210	Trughanacmy	Castleisland	Tralee												
Doon	863	Dunkerron South	Kilcrohane	Kenmare												
Doon East	416	Iraghticonnor	Killehenny	Listowel												
Doon North	342	Trughanacmy	Tralee	Tralee												
Doon South	174	Trughanacmy	Tralee	Tralee												
Doon West	242	Iraghticonnor	Killehenny	Listowel												
Doonamontane	265	Clanmaurice	Ballyheige	Tralee												
Doonard Lower	166	Iraghticonnor	Kilnaughtin	Glin												
Doonard Upper	401	Iraghticonnor	Kilnaughtin	Glin												
Dooncaha	1,097	Iraghticonnor	Kilnaughtin	Glin												
Dooneen	525	Iveragh	Killinane	Cahersiveen												
Dooneen	262	Magunihy	Aghadoe	Killarney												
Dooneen	171	Magunihy	Kilcummin	Killarney												
Dooneen	81	Trughanacmy	Castleisland	Tralee												
Doonimlaghbeg	158	Trughanacmy	Ballymacelligott	Tralee												
Doonkinane	276	Magunihy	Aglish	Killarney												
Doonmanagh	285	Corkaguiny	Minard	Dingle												
Doonore North	216	Corkaguiny	Kilgobban	Tralee												
Doonore South	207	Corkaguiny	Kilgobban	Tralee												
Doonryan	135	Magunihy	Kilcummin	Killarney												
Doonsheane	417	Corkaguiny	Dingle	Dingle												
Doonties Commons	129	Corkaguiny	Minard	Dingle												
Doonties East	37	Corkaguiny	Minard	Dingle												
Doonties West	414	Corkaguiny	Minard	Dingle												
Doorah	217	Corkaguiny	Ballinvoher	Dingle												
Doory	794	Iveragh	Dromod	Cahersiveen												
Doory	584	Iveragh	Killemlagh	Cahersiveen												
Doory	284	Iveragh	Glanbehy	Cahersiveen												
Doughill	423	Glanarought	Kenmare	Kenmare												
Douglas	308	Trughanacmy	Killorglin	Killarney												
Dreenagh	903	Clanmaurice	Ballyheige	Tralee												
Dreenagh	595	Iveragh	Glanbehy	Cahersiveen												
Drimna Beg	349	Dunkerron South	Kilcrohane	Kenmare												
Drimna More	785	Dunkerron South	Kilcrohane	Kenmare												
Drom	529	Magunihy	Kilcummin	Killarney												
Drom	491	Iveragh	Glanbehy	Cahersiveen												
Drom	87	Iraghticonnor	Kilconly	Listowel												
Drom East	355	Corkaguiny	Cloghane	Dingle												
Drom East	135	Iveragh	Glanbehy	Cahersiveen												
Drom West	474	Iveragh	Glanbehy	Cahersiveen												
Drom West	244	Corkaguiny	Cloghane	Dingle												
Dromaclaurig	746	Glanarought	Tuosist	Kenmare												
Dromacoosh	596	Glanarought	Kilgarvan	Kenmare												
Dromadda Beg	855	Clanmaurice	Kilshenane	Listowel												
Dromadda More	2,000	Clanmaurice	Kilshenane	Listowel												
Dromadeesirt	283	Magunihy	Kilcummin	Killarney												
Dromagorteen	297	Glanarought	Kilcaskan	Kenmare												
Dromalivaun	364	Iraghticonnor	Aghavallen	Listowel												
Dromalonhurt	1,805	Iveragh	Glanbehy	Cahersiveen												
Dromaloughane	166	Dunkerron North	Knockane	Killarney												
Dromalught	607	Iraghticonnor	Galey	Listowel												
Dromanassig	466	Glanarought	Kenmare	Kenmare												
Dromaragh	528	Iveragh	Dromod	Cahersiveen												
Dromatoor	438	Clanmaurice	Ballyheige	Tralee												
Dromatouk	485	Glanarought	Kenmare	Kenmare												
Dromavally	884	Corkaguiny	Ballinvoher	Dingle												
Dromavally	358	Trughanacmy	Ballyseedy	Tralee												
Dromavally	144	Trughanacmy	Killorglin	Killarney												
Dromavrauka	191	Magunihy	Killaha	Killarney												
Drombane	229	Glanarought	Tuosist	Kenmare												
Drombeg	215	Iraghticonnor	Galey	Listowel												
Drombohilly Lower	814	Glanarought	Tuosist	Kenmare												
Drombohilly Upper	777	Glanarought	Tuosist	Kenmare												
Drombrane	621	Iveragh	Glanbehy	Cahersiveen												
Drombrick	97	Magunihy	Kilbonane	Killarney												
Dromcahan East	303	Glanarought	Kenmare	Kenmare												
Dromcahan West	366	Glanarought	Kenmare	Kenmare												
Dromcarban	290	Magunihy	Killaha	Killarney												
Dromclogh	370	Clanmaurice	Kilshenane	Listowel												
Dromcunnia	103	Dunkerron South	Templenoe	Kenmare												
Dromcunnig	703	Clanmaurice	O'Dorney	Tralee												
Dromdarragh	421	Dunkerron North	Knockane	Cahersiveen												
Dromdiralough	225	Magunihy	Killaha	Killarney												
Dromdiraowen	105	Glanarought	Tuosist	Kenmare												
Dromdoohig Beg	114	Magunihy	Aglish	Killarney												
Dromdoohig More	367	Magunihy	Aghadoe	Killarney												
Dromdoory	164	Dunkerron North	Knockane	Cahersiveen												
Dromerkeen	226	Glanarought	Tuosist	Kenmare												
Dromgower	216	Clanmaurice	Ballyheige	Tralee												
Dromhale	103	Magunihy	Killarney	Killarney												
Dromhumper	158	Magunihy	Killarney	Killarney												
Dromickbane	202	Magunihy	Killarney	Killarney												
Dromin	272	Iraghticonnor	Listowel	Listowel												
Dromin	254	Magunihy	Killorglin	Killarney												
Dromin	239	Iraghticonnor	Killehenny	Listowel												
Dromin	239	Magunihy	Aghadoe	Killarney												
Dromin East	261	Magunihy	Killorglin	Killarney												
Dromin Lower	105	Iraghticonnor	Listowel	Listowel												
Dromin Upper	199	Iraghticonnor	Listowel	Listowel												
Dromin West	274	Magunihy	Killorglin	Killarney												
Drominaharee	280	Magunihy	Killaha	Killarney												
Dromkeare	255	Iveragh	Dromod	Cahersiveen												
Dromkeen East	684	Clanmaurice	Killury	Listowel												
Dromkeen West	729	Clanmaurice	Killury	Listowel												
Dromkerry	342	Magunihy	Kilbonane	Killarney												
Dromleagh	312	Dunkerron North	Killorglin	Cahersiveen												
Dromlegagh	92	Clanmaurice	Duagh	Listowel												
Dromlegagh Demesne	73	Clanmaurice	Duagh	Listowel												
Dromloughra	291	Iraghticonnor	Dysert	Listowel												
Dromlusk	1,559	Dunkerron South	Kilcrohane	Kenmare												
Dromluska	320	Dunkerron North	Knockane	Killarney												
Drommakee	311	Clanmaurice	Kiltomy	Listowel												
**Drommartin**	Town	Clanmaurice	Rattoo	Listowel												
Drommartin	382	Clanmaurice	Rattoo	Listowel												
Drommurher	197	Iraghticonnor	Murher	Listowel												
Drommurrin	491	Iraghticonnor	Galey	Listowel												
Dromnacarra	673	Clanmaurice	Killury	Listowel												
Dromnakilly	564	Iveragh	Dromod	Cahersiveen												
Dromneavane	330	Glanarought	Kenmare	Kenmare												
Dromnycolman	379	Glanarought	Kilgarvan	Kenmare												
Dromod	429	Iveragh	Dromod	Cahersiveen												
Dromore	612	Magunihy	Molahiffe	Killarney												
Dromore	518	Dunkerron South	Templenoe	Kenmare												
Dromore Old	492	Dunkerron South	Templenoe	Kenmare												
Dromreag	215	Magunihy	Kilnanare	Killarney												
Dromroe	393	Glanarought	Tuosist	Kenmare												
Dromroe	152	Trughanacmy	Dysert	Killarney												
Dromroe	101	Clanmaurice	Rattoo	Listowel												
Dromstabla	61	Dunkerron North	Knockane	Cahersiveen												
Dromtea	236	Iveragh	Killinane	Cahersiveen												
Dromteewakeen	804	Dunkerron North	Knockane	Kenmare												
Dromthacker	242	Trughanacmy	Ratass	Tralee												
Dromtine	917	Dunkerron South	Kilcrohane	Kenmare												
Dromultan	840	Trughanacmy	Killeentierna	Killarney												
Dromultan	679	Trughanacmy	Castleisland	Tralee												
Dromyrourk	266	Magunihy	Killarney	Killarney												
**Duagh**	Town	Clanmaurice	Duagh	Listowel												
Duagh	303	Corkaguiny	Killiney	Dingle												
Duagh	236	Clanmaurice	Duagh	Listowel												
Ducalla	411	Iveragh	Killemlagh	Cahersiveen												
Dughile and Coomavanniha	1,195	Iveragh	Dromod	Cahersiveen												
Dunferris	146	Iraghticonnor	Lisselton	Listowel												
Dungeagan	207	Iveragh	Prior	Cahersiveen												
Dungeel	326	Magunihy	Killorglin	Killarney												
Dunkerron	713	Dunkerron South	Templenoe	Kenmare												
Dunkerron Island East	22	Dunkerron South	Templenoe	Kenmare												
Dunkerron Island West	30	Dunkerron South	Templenoe	Kenmare												
Dunloe Lower	157	Dunkerron North	Knockane	Killarney												
Dunloe Upper	4,089	Dunkerron North	Knockane	Killarney												
Dunmaniheen	131	Magunihy	Killorglin	Killarney												
Dysert	337	Clanmaurice	Dysert	Listowel												
Dysert Marshes	298	Clanmaurice	Dysert	Listowel												
Eightercua	503	Dunkerron South	Kilcrohane	Cahersiveen												
Einaun Island	7	Dunkerron South	Kilcrohane	Kenmare												
Eirk	787	Dunkerron South	Templenoe	Kenmare												
Emlagh	929	Corkaguiny	Ballinvoher	Dingle												
Emlagh	162	Iveragh	Caher	Cahersiveen												
Emlagh	120	Corkaguiny	Cloghane	Dingle												
Emlagh	65	Corkaguiny	Kilmalkedar	Dingle												
Emlagh East	265	Corkaguiny	Marhin	Dingle												
Emlagh East	137	Corkaguiny	Dingle	Dingle												
Emlagh West	209	Corkaguiny	Marhin	Dingle												
Emlagh West	41	Corkaguiny	Dingle	Dingle												
Emlaghdreenagh	217	Iveragh	Prior	Cahersiveen												
Emlaghlea	173	Iveragh	Prior	Cahersiveen												
Emlaghmore East	332	Iveragh	Prior	Cahersiveen												
Emlaghmore West	178	Iveragh	Prior	Cahersiveen												
Emlaghnamuck	381	Iveragh	Prior	Cahersiveen												
Emlaghpeastia	562	Iveragh	Killemlagh	Cahersiveen												
Emlaghreagh	142	Corkaguiny	Marhin	Dingle												
Emlaghslat	204	Corkaguiny	Ventry	Dingle												
Ennismore	432	Iraghticonnor	Dysert	Listowel												
Erneen	1,713	Glanarought	Kilcaskan	Kenmare												
Esk	294	Trughanacmy	O'Brennan	Tralee												
Esk East	994	Glanarought	Kilcaskan	Kenmare												
Esk West	534	Glanarought	Kilcaskan	Kenmare												
Eskadawer	371	Glanarought	Tuosist	Kenmare												
Eskine	483	Dunkerron South	Kilcrohane	Kenmare												
Eskwacruttia	263	Dunkerron North	Knockane	Killarney												
Faghbane	109	Magunihy	Killarney	Killarney												
Faghcullia	358	Magunihy	Killarney	Killarney												
Faha	1,079	Corkaguiny	Cloghane	Dingle												
Faha	281	Iveragh	Glanbehy	Cahersiveen												
Faha	252	Iraghticonnor	Kilconly	Listowel												
Faha East	229	Magunihy	Kilbonane	Killarney												
Faha West	187	Magunihy	Kilbonane	Killarney												
Fahaduff	718	Trughanacmy	Castleisland	Tralee												
Fahamore	244	Corkaguiny	Stradbally	Dingle												
Fahan	490	Corkaguiny	Ballinvoher	Dingle												
Fahavane	359	Clanmaurice	Kilflyn	Tralee												
Farna	1,500	Trughanacmy	Kilgarrylander	Tralee												
Farran	189	Clanmaurice	Killury	Listowel												
Farran	187	Clanmaurice	O'Dorney	Tralee												
Farran	122	Trughanacmy	Dysert	Tralee												
Farran	91	Corkaguiny	Dingle	Dingle												
Farran	18	Corkaguiny	Cloghane	Dingle												
Farranalickeen	52	Corkaguiny	Ballinvoher	Dingle												
Farranamanagh	260	Trughanacmy	Currans	Killarney												
Farranaspig	70	Magunihy	Aghadoe	Killarney												
Farranastack	368	Iraghticonnor	Lisselton	Listowel												
Farranawana	213	Iraghticonnor	Kilnaughtin	Glin												
Farrandalouge	219	Corkaguiny	Stradbally	Dingle												
Farrandeen	47	Clanmaurice	Kilcaragh	Listowel												
Farrandoctor	193	Trughanacmy	Currans	Killarney												
Farranedmond	10	Clanmaurice	Rattoo	Listowel												
Farraneesteenig	57	Corkaguiny	Garfinny	Dingle												
Farranflaherty	66	Corkaguiny	Dingle	Dingle												
Farranfore	210	Magunihy	Molahiffe	Killarney												
Farraniaragh	408	Dunkerron South	Kilcrohane	Cahersiveen												
Farrankeal	246	Trughanacmy	Killeentierna	Killarney												
Farranlateeve	374	Corkaguiny	Dunurlin	Dingle												
Farranmanagh	741	Magunihy	Kilcolman	Killarney												
Farrannabrack	144	Trughanacmy	Castleisland	Tralee												
Farrannacarriga	202	Corkaguiny	Ballynacourty	Dingle												
Farrannahow	245	Iveragh	Dromod	Cahersiveen												
Farrannakilla	92	Corkaguiny	Stradbally	Dingle												
Farrannakilla	49	Corkaguiny	Dingle	Dingle												
Farranpierce	509	Iraghticonnor	Killehenny	Listowel												
Farranreagh	430	Iveragh	Valencia	Cahersiveen												
Farranredmond	30	Corkaguiny	Dingle	Dingle												
Farranstephen	45	Trughanacmy	Tralee	Tralee												
Farrantaun	22	Corkaguiny	Killiney	Dingle												
Farrantooleen	219	Corkaguiny	Stradbally	Dingle												
Farrantoreen	336	Trughanacmy	Killorglin	Killarney												
Farranwilliam	22	Clanmaurice	Ardfert	Tralee												
Feaghmaan East	158	Iveragh	Valencia	Cahersiveen												
Feaghmaan West	387	Iveragh	Valencia	Cahersiveen												
Feavautia	412	Trughanacmy	Castleisland	Tralee												
Feeans	510	Clanmaurice	Killury	Listowel												
Fehanagh	529	Glanarought	Tuosist	Kenmare												
Fenit Within	438	Trughanacmy	Fenit	Tralee												
Fenit Without	243	Trughanacmy	Fenit	Tralee												
Feohanagh	205	Corkaguiny	Kilquane	Dingle												
Feoramore	591	Glanarought	Tuosist	Kenmare												
Feorus East	233	Glanarought	Tuosist	Kenmare												
Feorus West	295	Glanarought	Tuosist	Kenmare												
Fermoyle	1,921	Iveragh	Prior	Cahersiveen												
Fermoyle	1,397	Dunkerron South	Kilcrohane	Kenmare												
Fermoyle	172	Corkaguiny	Cloghane	Dingle												
Ferritersquarter	498	Corkaguiny	Dunquin	Dingle												
Ferta	938	Magunihy	Killarney	Killarney												
Fiddane	156	Trughanacmy	Nohaval	Tralee												
Fieries	407	Trughanacmy	Ballincuslane	Tralee												
Fieries	254	Magunihy	Kilnanare	Killarney												
**Finuge**	Town	Clanmaurice	Finuge	Listowel												
Finuge	883	Clanmaurice	Finuge	Listowel												
Flemby	518	Trughanacmy	Ballymacelligott	Tralee												
Flemingstown	383	Corkaguiny	Ballinvoher	Dingle												
Flemingstown	177	Corkaguiny	Garfinny	Dingle												
Flintfield	147	Magunihy	Aglish	Killarney												
Foardal	758	Dunkerron South	Knockane	Killarney												
Foheraghmore	276	Corkaguiny	Kinard	Dingle												
Foil	76	Clanmaurice	Duagh	Listowel												
Foiladaune	703	Magunihy	Killaha	Killarney												
Foilatrisnig	207	Corkaguiny	Kilgobban	Tralee												
Foildarrig	264	Clanmaurice	Duagh	Listowel												
Foildrenagh	392	Iveragh	Dromod	Cahersiveen												
Foilduff	290	Iveragh	Killinane	Cahersiveen												
Foilmore	147	Iveragh	Killinane	Cahersiveen												
Foilnageragh	172	Iveragh	Killemlagh	Cahersiveen												
Fortwilliam	288	Clanmaurice	O'Dorney	Tralee												
Fossa	177	Magunihy	Aghadoe	Killarney												
Foughil Island	15	Iveragh	Caher	Cahersiveen												
Freaghanagh	446	Magunihy	Killaha	Killarney												
Freemount	185	Magunihy	Kilcummin	Killarney												
Furhane	412	Clanmaurice	Kilshenane	Listowel												
Fussa	239	Glanarought	Kilgarvan	Kenmare												
Fustane Lower	471	Glanarought	Kenmare	Kenmare												
Fustane Upper	236	Glanarought	Kenmare	Kenmare												
Fybagh	933	Trughanacmy	Kilgarrylander	Tralee												
Gallarus	492	Corkaguiny	Kilmalkedar	Dingle												
Gallavally	210	Dunkerron South	Knockane	Killarney												
Gallavally	118	Dunkerron North	Knockane	Killarney												
Gallowfields	89	Trughanacmy	Tralee	Tralee												
Garfinny	556	Corkaguiny	Garfinny	Dingle												
Garinish	57	Dunkerron South	Kilcrohane	Kenmare												
Garrahadoo	140	Trughanacmy	Killorglin	Killarney												
Garrahies	86	Corkaguiny	Kilgobban	Tralee												
Garrane	556	Corkaguiny	Kilmalkedar	Dingle												
Garrane	399	Iveragh	Killemlagh	Cahersiveen												
Garrane	369	Dunkerron North	Knockane	Cahersiveen												
Garrane	327	Trughanacmy	Tralee	Tralee												
Garrane East	465	Trughanacmy	Killorglin	Killarney												
Garrane North	360	Iveragh	Killinane	Cahersiveen												
Garrane South	776	Iveragh	Killinane	Cahersiveen												
Garrane West	334	Trughanacmy	Killorglin	Killarney												
Garranearagh	414	Iveragh	Caher	Cahersiveen												
Garranebane	506	Iveragh	Caher	Cahersiveen												
Garranes	944	Glanarought	Tuosist	Kenmare												
Garranes	203	Glanarought	Kilcaskan	Kenmare												
Garrannafulla	312	Iveragh	Dromod	Cahersiveen												
Garraun	653	Magunihy	Molahiffe	Killarney												
Garraun Beg	87	Trughanacmy	Ballymacelligott	Tralee												
Garraun More	232	Trughanacmy	Ballymacelligott	Tralee												
Garraundarragh	316	Trughanacmy	Currans	Killarney												
Garreiny	785	Iveragh	Dromod	Cahersiveen												
Garries	618	Magunihy	Killaha	Killarney												
Garrough	480	Dunkerron South	Kilcrohane	Cahersiveen												
Garryantanvally	703	Clanmaurice	Finuge	Listowel												
Garryard	232	Iraghticonnor	Galey	Listowel												
Garrydine	305	Iveragh	Killinane	Cahersiveen												
Garryglass	130	Iveragh	Dromod	Cahersiveen												
Garryletter	329	Glanarought	Kilcaskan	Kenmare												
Garrymore	161	Glanarought	Kilcaskan	Kenmare												
Garrynadur	207	Corkaguiny	Minard	Dingle												
Garrynagore	361	Clanmaurice	Kiltomy	Listowel												
Garrynaneaskagh	503	Clanmaurice	Kilmoyly	Tralee												
Garrywilliam	75	Corkaguiny	Stradbally	Dingle												
Gearha	491	Dunkerron South	Kilcrohane	Kenmare												
Gearha	457	Magunihy	Molahiffe	Killarney												
Gearha	337	Dunkerron North	Knockane	Killarney												
Gearha	331	Glanarought	Kilcaskan	Kenmare												
Gearha North	431	Dunkerron South	Templenoe	Kenmare												
Gearha South	519	Dunkerron South	Templenoe	Kenmare												
Gearhadiveen	403	Glanarought	Kenmare	Kenmare												
Gearhameen	983	Dunkerron North	Knockane	Killarney												
Gearhameen	48	Dunkerron South	Knockane	Killarney												
Gearhanagoul	806	Glanarought	Kilcaskan	Kenmare												
Gearhasallagh	984	Dunkerron South	Templenoe	Kenmare												
Glanaderhig	499	Clanmaurice	Kilshenane	Listowel												
Glanageenty	421	Trughanacmy	Ballymacelligott	Tralee												
Glanawaddra	1,415	Trughanacmy	Ballincuslane	Tralee												
Glanawillin	224	Iraghticonnor	Aghavallen	Listowel												
Glanballyma	397	Clanmaurice	Kilflyn	Tralee												
Glanbane	448	Trughanacmy	Currans	Killarney												
Glanbeg	362	Iveragh	Dromod	Cahersiveen												
Glanbeg	144	Dunkerron South	Kilcrohane	Cahersiveen												
Glancullare North	117	Iraghticonnor	Kilnaughtin	Glin												
Glancullare South	389	Iraghticonnor	Kilnaughtin	Glin												
Glancuttaun Lower	1,124	Dunkerron North	Killorglin	Cahersiveen												
Glancuttaun Upper	897	Dunkerron North	Killorglin	Cahersiveen												
Glandaeagh	633	Trughanacmy	Killeentierna	Killarney												
Glandahalin East	611	Clanmaurice	Ballyheige	Tralee												
Glandahalin West	236	Clanmaurice	Ballyheige	Tralee												
Glandine	152	Corkaguiny	Kilgobban	Tralee												
Glanearagh	234	Iveragh	Killemlagh	Cahersiveen												
Glanerdalliv	258	Clanmaurice	Rattoo	Listowel												
Glanfahan	513	Corkaguiny	Ballinvoher	Dingle												
Glangristeen	289	Magunihy	Kilcummin	Killarney												
Glankeagh	155	Clanmaurice	O'Dorney	Tralee												
Glanlarehan	549	Trughanacmy	Ballincuslane	Tralee												
Glanlea	851	Trughanacmy	Dysert	Tralee												
Glanleam	257	Iveragh	Valencia	Cahersiveen												
Glanlick	74	Corkaguiny	Dunquin	Dingle												
Glanlough Lower	284	Dunkerron South	Kilcrohane	Kenmare												
Glanlough North	120	Corkaguiny	Killiney	Dingle												
Glanlough South	735	Corkaguiny	Killiney	Dingle												
Glanlough Upper	306	Dunkerron South	Kilcrohane	Kenmare												
Glanlough West	344	Corkaguiny	Killiney	Dingle												
Glanmakee	761	Dunkerron North	Knockane	Cahersiveen												
Glanmane	352	Corkaguiny	Killiney	Dingle												
Glanmininard	374	Corkaguiny	Minard	Dingle												
Glanmore	2,245	Glanarought	Tuosist	Kenmare												
Glanmore	554	Corkaguiny	Kilgobban	Tralee												
Glanmore	126	Corkaguiny	Dunquin	Dingle												
Glannagalt	370	Corkaguiny	Kilgobban	Tralee												
Glannagilliagh	977	Iveragh	Killorglin	Killarney												
Glannaheera	393	Corkaguiny	Ballinvoher	Dingle												
Glannalappa East	729	Iraghticonnor	Murher	Glin												
Glannalappa Middle	188	Iraghticonnor	Murher	Glin												
Glannalappa West	201	Iraghticonnor	Murher	Glin												
Glanoe	423	Clanmaurice	Kilfeighny	Listowel												
Glanowen	1,718	Trughanacmy	Ballincuslane	Tralee												
Glanrastel	2,629	Glanarought	Tuosist	Kenmare												
Glanshanacuirp	2,339	Corkaguiny	Cloghane	Dingle												
Glanshearoon	324	Trughanacmy	Castleisland	Tralee												
Glansillagh	247	Iraghticonnor	Kilnaughtin	Glin												
Glantane	310	Corkaguiny	Ballinvoher	Dingle												
Glantaunluskaha	282	Trughanacmy	Brosna	Tralee												
Glantaunyalkeen	643	Clanmaurice	Kilshenane	Listowel												
Glanteenassig	3,187	Corkaguiny	Killiney	Dingle												
Glantrasna	2,105	Glanarought	Tuosist	Kenmare												
Glashabeg	98	Corkaguiny	Kilmalkedar	Dingle												
Glashacormcik	1,980	Magunihy	Killaha	Killarney												
Glashanacree	742	Clanmaurice	Kilshenane	Listowel												
Glashananoon	436	Clanmaurice	Kilshenane	Listowel												
Glebe	100	Iveragh	Killinane	Cahersiveen												
Glebe	75	Magunihy	Kilcummin	Killarney												
Glebe	49	Magunihy	Kilcredane	Killarney												
Glebe	44	Corkaguiny	Dunquin	Dingle												
Glebe	34	Trughanacmy	Ballynahaglish	Tralee												
Gleensk	1,031	Iveragh	Killinane	Cahersiveen												
Gleesk	532	Dunkerron South	Kilcrohane	Kenmare												
Glen	237	Magunihy	Killaha	Killarney												
Glena	2,062	Magunihy	Killarney	Killarney												
Glenderry	1,075	Clanmaurice	Ballyheige	Tralee												
Glenlea	309	Clanmaurice	Ballyheige	Tralee												
Glennahoo	458	Corkaguiny	Ballyduff	Dingle												
Glennahoo	88	Corkaguiny	Stradbally	Dingle												
Glin North	1,264	Corkaguiny	Dingle	Dingle												
Glin South	407	Corkaguiny	Dingle	Dingle												
Gloragh	982	Dunkerron South	Kilcrohane	Kenmare												
Glouria	645	Iraghticonnor	Galey	Listowel												
Gneeves	857	Trughanacmy	Brosna	Tralee												
Gneeves	131	Magunihy	Kilbonane	Killarney												
Gneevgullia	347	Magunihy	Kilcummin	Killarney												
Gortacappul	285	Trughanacmy	Ballincuslane	Tralee												
Gortacareen	614	Magunihy	Kilcummin	Killarney												
Gortacloghane	649	Clanmaurice	Kilshenane	Listowel												
Gortacloghane	553	Dunkerron South	Templenoe	Kenmare												
Gortacollopa	229	Magunihy	Aghadoe	Killarney												
Gortacreenteen	984	Glanarought	Kilgarvan	Kenmare												
Gortacrossane	390	Iraghticonnor	Listowel	Listowel												
Gortacurraun	366	Corkaguiny	Ballynacourty	Dingle												
Gortadirra	1,527	Dunkerron North	Aghadoe	Killarney												
Gortadoo	418	Corkaguiny	Dunurlin	Dingle												
Gortadrislig	173	Clanmaurice	Kilcaragh	Listowel												
Gortaforia	380	Iveragh	Killinane	Cahersiveen												
Gortagass	357	Glanarought	Kenmare	Kenmare												
Gortagowan	2,043	Dunkerron South	Kilcrohane	Kenmare												
Gortagreenane	167	Dunkerron North	Killorglin	Cahersiveen												
Gortagullane	870	Magunihy	Killarney	Killarney												
Gortagullane	68	Trughanacmy	Ballymacelligott	Tralee												
Gortagurrane East	89	Iraghticonnor	Ballyconry	Listowel												
Gortagurrane Wast	125	Iraghticonnor	Ballyconry	Listowel												
Gortahoonig	115	Magunihy	Killarney	Killarney												
Gortahoosh	305	Magunihy	Killaha	Killarney												
Gortalassa	165	Magunihy	Molahiffe	Killarney												
Gortalassa	103	Glanarought	Kenmare	Kenmare												
Gortalee	1,237	Magunihy	Killaha	Killarney												
Gortaleen	250	Trughanacmy	Kilgarrylander	Tralee												
Gortaleen-mountain	997	Trughanacmy	Kilgarrylander	Tralee												
Gortalicka	616	Magunihy	Killaha	Killarney												
Gortalinny North	395	Glanarought	Kenmare	Kenmare												
Gortalinny South	258	Glanarought	Kenmare	Kenmare												
Gortaloughane	1,241	Glanarought	Kilgarvan	Killarney												
Gortamullin	783	Dunkerron South	Templenoe	Kenmare												
Gortanahaneboy East	699	Magunihy	Kilcummin	Killarney												
Gortanahaneboy West	443	Magunihy	Kilcummin	Killarney												
Gortaneare	124	Clanmaurice	Kilcaragh	Listowel												
Gortaneare	37	Clanmaurice	Kiltomy	Listowel												
Gortaneden	888	Trughanacmy	Kilgarrylander	Tralee												
Gortanimerisk	61	Clanmaurice	Duagh	Listowel												
Gortard	135	Iraghticonnor	Aghavallen	Listowel												
Gortaree	137	Magunihy	Aghadoe	Killarney												
Gortaspiddale	22	Clanmaurice	Ardfert	Tralee												
Gortatlea	699	Trughanacmy	Ballymacelligott	Tralee												
Gortatlea	458	Iveragh	Dromod	Cahersiveen												
Gortavallig	283	Glanarought	Tuosist	Kenmare												
Gortavullin	106	Magunihy	Molahiffe	Killarney												
Gortboy	546	Dunkerron North	Knockane	Killarney												
Gortbrack	431	Dunkerron South	Templenoe	Kenmare												
Gortbrack East	178	Trughanacmy	Ballyseedy	Tralee												
Gortbrack West	178	Trughanacmy	Ballyseedy	Tralee												
Gortbreagoge	233	Corkaguiny	Ballinvoher	Dingle												
Gortclohy	795	Clanmaurice	Kilflyn	Tralee												
Gortcurreen	406	Iraghticonnor	Listowel	Listowel												
Gortderraree	389	Magunihy	Killarney	Killarney												
Gortderrig	1,201	Magunihy	Kilcummin	Killarney												
Gortdirraghy	367	Iveragh	Glanbehy	Cahersiveen												
Gortdromagh	988	Dunkerron South	Kilcrohane	Kenmare												
Gortdromagownagh	1,186	Iraghticonnor	Knockanure	Listowel												
Gortdromakiery	3,022	Magunihy	Killarney	Killarney												
Gortdromasillahy	705	Iraghticonnor	Murher	Listowel												
Gortdromerillagh	409	Magunihy	Kilnanare	Killarney												
Gortfadda	379	Dunkerron South	Kilcrohane	Kenmare												
Gortglass	829	Trughanacmy	Ballincuslane	Tralee												
Gortgower	53	Iveragh	Valencia	Cahersiveen												
Gortlahard	784	Glanarought	Kenmare	Kenmare												
Gortlahard	649	Glanarought	Kilgarvan	Kenmare												
Gortlicka	459	Glanarought	Tuosist	Kenmare												
Gortloughera	391	Glanarought	Kilgarvan	Kenmare												
Gortloughra	936	Dunkerron North	Killorglin	Killarney												
Gortmaloon East	571	Dunkerron North	Knockane	Cahersiveen												
Gortmaloon West	563	Dunkerron North	Knockane	Cahersiveen												
Gortmarrahafineen	733	Glanarought	Kilgarvan	Kenmare												
Gortmore	84	Iveragh	Killinane	Cahersiveen												
Gortmore	26	Corkaguiny	Dunurlin	Dingle												
Gortnabinny	415	Glanarought	Kilcaskan	Kenmare												
Gortnaboul	254	Glanarought	Kilgarvan	Kenmare												
Gortnaboul Lower	203	Glanarought	Kenmare	Kenmare												
Gortnaboul Upper	126	Glanarought	Kenmare	Kenmare												
Gortnacarriga	258	Magunihy	Aghadoe	Killarney												
Gortnacurra	355	Glanarought	Kenmare	Kenmare												
Gortnadullagh	205	Glanarought	Kenmare	Kenmare												
Gortnagan Beg	159	Dunkerron North	Knockane	Cahersiveen												
Gortnagan More	145	Dunkerron North	Knockane	Cahersiveen												
Gortnagane	643	Magunihy	Kilcummin	Killarney												
Gortnagappul	154	Glanarought	Kilcaskan	Kenmare												
Gortnaglogh	198	Magunihy	Kilnanare	Killarney												
Gortnagree	780	Iveragh	Killinane	Cahersiveen												
Gortnagulla	475	Iveragh	Killinane	Cahersiveen												
Gortnagullanagh	96	Corkaguiny	Minard	Dingle												
Gortnahulla	64	Trughanacmy	Kilgarrylander	Tralee												
Gortnakilla	640	Magunihy	Killaha	Killarney												
Gortnakilly	62	Dunkerron South	Kilcrohane	Cahersiveen												
Gortnaleaha	107	Trughanacmy	Ballymacelligott	Tralee												
Gortnaleaha	58	Trughanacmy	O'Brennan	Tralee												
Gortnamackanee	699	Dunkerron South	Kilcrohane	Cahersiveen												
Gortnaminsha	301	Iraghticonnor	Dysert	Listowel												
Gortnamuckaly	66	Trughanacmy	Clogherbrien	Tralee												
Gortnanooran	197	Corkaguiny	Ballinvoher	Dingle												
Gortnaprocess	334	Magunihy	Kilcummin	Killarney												
Gortnaskarry	322	Dunkerron North	Knockane	Killarney												
Gortnaskeagh	395	Glanarought	Kilgarvan	Kenmare												
Gortnaskeha	718	Iraghticonnor	Killehenny	Listowel												
Gortnaskeha Commons	150	Iraghticonnor	Killehenny	Listowel												
Gortnatona	162	Magunihy	Kilcummin	Killarney												
Gortonora	85	Corkaguiny	Dingle	Dingle												
Gortracussane	408	Magunihy	Killarney	Killarney												
Gortreagh	98	Magunihy	Aghadoe	Killarney												
Gortreagh	77	Iveragh	Killemlagh	Cahersiveen												
Gortrelig	240	Dunkerron North	Knockane	Cahersiveen												
Gortroe	1,353	Magunihy	Killarney	Killarney												
Gortroe	630	Trughanacmy	Castleisland	Tralee												
Gortroe	382	Magunihy	Aghadoe	Killarney												
Gortrooskagh	323	Glanarought	Kenmare	Kenmare												
Gortshanavogh	486	Magunihy	Killeentierna	Killarney												
Gortshanvally	82	Trughanacmy	Ballymacelligott	Tralee												
Goulnacappy & Coornagrena	816	Dunkerron North	Killorglin	Cahersiveen												
Gowlane	875	Corkaguiny	Stradbally	Dingle												
Gowlane	651	Glanarought	Kenmare	Kenmare												
Gowlane	412	Iveragh	Glanbehy	Cahersiveen												
Gowlane	399	Dunkerron South	Templenoe	Kenmare												
Gowlane	332	Magunihy	Molahiffe	Killarney												
Gowlane Beg	669	Corkaguiny	Kinard	Dingle												
Gowlane East	537	Corkaguiny	Kinard	Dingle												
Gowlaneard	479	Corkaguiny	Kinard	Dingle												
Gowlanes	827	Dunkerron South	Kilcrohane	Kenmare												
Gowlanes East	731	Dunkerron South	Kilcrohane	Kenmare												
Gowlin	614	Corkaguiny	Kinard	Dingle												
Graffee	175	Corkaguiny	Kilquane	Dingle												
Graffeens	54	Magunihy	Molahiffe	Killarney												
Graignagower	788	Dunkerron South	Templenoe	Kenmare												
Graignagreana	698	Dunkerron North	Templenoe	Kenmare												
Graigue	363	Corkaguiny	Dunurlin	Dingle												
Graigue	266	Corkaguiny	Minard	Dingle												
Graigue Glebe	184	Clanmaurice	Ardfert	Tralee												
Graigues	336	Dunkerron South	Kilcrohane	Cahersiveen												
Gransha Lower	147	Trughanacmy	Kiltallagh	Tralee												
Gransha Upper	257	Trughanacmy	Kiltallagh	Tralee												
Granshagh	201	Clanmaurice	Kilcaragh	Listowel												
Great Blasket Island	1,020	Corkaguiny	Dunquin	Dingle												
Greenagh	299	Magunihy	Aghadoe	Killarney												
Greenane	697	Dunkerron South	Templenoe	Kenmare												
Greenane Islands	24	Dunkerron South	Templenoe	Kenmare												
Grogeen	95	Clanmaurice	Finuge	Listowel												
Groin	177	Dunkerron North	Killorglin	Killarney												
Groin	67	Magunihy	Aghadoe	Killarney												
Grousemount	1,609	Glanarought	Kilgarvan	Kenmare												
Grove	72	Corkaguiny	Dingle	Dingle												
Guhard North	315	Iraghticonnor	Lisselton	Listowel												
Guhard South	413	Iraghticonnor	Lisselton	Listowel												
Gullaba	765	Glanarought	Kilgarvan	Kenmare												
Gullane East	402	Iraghticonnor	Kilconly	Listowel												
Gullane Middle	146	Iraghticonnor	Kilconly	Listowel												
Gullane West	150	Iraghticonnor	Kilconly	Listowel												
Gullaun East	328	Magunihy	Kilcummin	Killarney												
Gullaun West	405	Magunihy	Kilcummin	Killarney												
Gurrig Island	8	Corkaguiny	Killiney	Dingle												
Gurteen	533	Corkaguiny	Ballinvoher	Dingle												
Gurteen	445	Glanarought	Kilgarvan	Kenmare												
Gurteen	343	Iveragh	Caher	Cahersiveen												
Gurteen	30	Corkaguiny	Ballynacourty	Dingle												
Gurteen North	63	Corkaguiny	Ballynacourty	Dingle												
Gurteenavallig	277	Iraghticonnor	Kilnaughtin	Glin												
Gurteennacloona	402	Iraghticonnor	Aghavallen	Listowel												
Gurteenroe	288	Magunihy	Molahiffe	Killarney												
Headfort	385	Magunihy	Aghadoe	Killarney												
Heirhill	395	Clanmaurice	Ballyheige	Tralee												
Hillgrove	99	Iveragh	Caher	Cahersiveen												
Hogs Head Island	9	Dunkerron South	Kilcrohane	Cahersiveen												
Horse Island	34	Iveragh	Prior	Cahersiveen												
Horse Island	6	Iveragh	Killemlagh	Cahersiveen												
Illaunacummig	7	Dunkerron South	Kilcrohane	Kenmare												
Illaunanadan	16	Dunkerron South	Kilcrohane	Kenmare												
Illaunboe	4	Corkaguiny	Killiney	Dingle												
Illaunboy	3	Corkaguiny	Dunquin	Dingle												
Illauncaum	161	Corkaguiny	Killiney	Dingle												
Illaundrane	26	Dunkerron South	Kilcrohane	Kenmare												
Illaunimmil	29	Corkaguiny	Killiney	Dingle												
Illaunleagh	9	Dunkerron South	Kilcrohane	Kenmare												
Illaunnakilla	7	Dunkerron South	Kilcrohane	Kenmare												
Illaunnaweelaun	6	Dunkerron South	Kilcrohane	Cahersiveen												
Illaunsillagh	9	Dunkerron South	Kilcrohane	Kenmare												
Illaunslea	18	Dunkerron South	Kilcrohane	Kenmare												
Illaunstookagh	311	Iveragh	Killorglin	Killarney												
Illauntaanig	2	Corkaguiny	Killiney	Dingle												
Inch	1,003	Corkaguiny	Ballinvoher	Dingle												
Inch	193	Magunihy	Killaha	Killarney												
Inch	77	Magunihy	Killarney	Killarney												
Inch East	312	Iraghticonnor	Galey	Listowel												
Inch East	251	Corkaguiny	Ballinvoher	Dingle												
Inch Moor	340	Iraghticonnor	Galey	Listowel												
Inch West	360	Corkaguiny	Ballinvoher	Dingle												
Inch West	207	Iraghticonnor	Galey	Listowel												
Inchaloughra	50	Corkaguiny	Killiney	Dingle												
Inchee	1,772	Glanarought	Kilgarvan	Kenmare												
Inchee East	601	Dunkerron South	Kilcrohane	Cahersiveen												
Inchee West	798	Dunkerron South	Kilcrohane	Cahersiveen												
Incheens	580	Magunihy	Killarney	Killarney												
Inchfarrannagheragh Gle	828	Dunkerron South	Kilcrohane	Cahersiveen												
Inchiboy	775	Iveragh	Dromod	Cahersiveen												
Inchiclogh	227	Iveragh	Caher	Cahersiveen												
Inchicloon	301	Glanarought	Tuosist	Kenmare												
Inchicorrigane East	463	Magunihy	Kilcummin	Killarney												
Inchicorrigane West	545	Magunihy	Kilcummin	Killarney												
Inchimacteige	252	Iveragh	Caher	Cahersiveen												
Inchimore	1,014	Glanarought	Kilgarvan	Kenmare												
Inchimore	311	Glanarought	Kenmare	Kenmare												
Inchin Lough	335	Glanarought	Tuosist	Kenmare												
Inchinaleega East	83	Dunkerron South	Kilcrohane	Kenmare												
Inchinaleega West	115	Dunkerron South	Kilcrohane	Kenmare												
Inchinanagh	1,736	Glanarought	Kilgarvan	Kenmare												
Inchinapeagh	711	Trughanacmy	Brosna	Tralee												
Inchinascarty	368	Iveragh	Dromod	Cahersiveen												
Inchinatinny	334	Iveragh	Dromod	Cahersiveen												
Inchincoosh	911	Glanarought	Kilgarvan	Kenmare												
Inchincummer	368	Trughanacmy	Killeentierna	Killarney												
Inchinglanna	740	Dunkerron South	Templenoe	Kenmare												
Inchintren	190	Iveragh	Killinane	Cahersiveen												
Inchinveema	195	Magunihy	Molahiffe	Killarney												
Inchycullane	229	Magunihy	Kilcummin	Killarney												
Inchymagilleragh East	28	Clanmaurice	Duagh	Listowel												
Inchymagilleragh West	92	Clanmaurice	Duagh	Listowel												
Inishabro	102	Corkaguiny	Dunquin	Dingle												
Inishfoyle	753	Glanarought	Kilcaskan	Kenmare												
Inishkeragh	12	Dunkerron South	Kilcrohane	Kenmare												
Inishtooskert	186	Corkaguiny	Dunquin	Dingle												
Inishtooskert	12	Corkaguiny	Killiney	Dingle												
Inishvickillane	171	Corkaguiny	Dunquin	Dingle												
Innisfallen	21	Magunihy	Aghadoe	Killarney												
Irrabeg	269	Clanmaurice	Kiltomy	Listowel												
Irramore	596	Clanmaurice	Kilfeighny	Listowel												
Island Sack	25	Iraghticonnor	Ballyconry	Listowel												
Island Sack Little	8	Iraghticonnor	Lisselton	Listowel												
Islandboy	985	Iveragh	Dromod	Cahersiveen												
Islandboy	137	Clanmaurice	Duagh	Listowel												
Islandboy East	81	Clanmaurice	Duagh	Listowel												
Islandboy West	9	Clanmaurice	Duagh	Listowel												
Islandearagh	425	Magunihy	Nohavaldaly	Killarney												
Islandganniv North	135	Iraghticonnor	Listowel	Listowel												
Islandganniv South	21	Clanmaurice	Listowel	Listowel												
Islandmacloughry	153	Clanmaurice	Finuge	Listowel												
Islandmore	125	Magunihy	Killaha	Killarney												
Istalea Lower	151	Glanarought	Kenmare	Kenmare												
Istalea Upper	349	Glanarought	Kenmare	Kenmare												
Kealafreaghane East	933	Iveragh	Dromod	Cahersiveen												
Kealafreaghane West	602	Iveragh	Dromod	Cahersiveen												
Kealariddig	463	Dunkerron South	Kilcrohane	Kenmare												
Kealduff Lower	279	Iveragh	Glanbehy	Cahersiveen												
Kealduff Upper	815	Iveragh	Glanbehy	Cahersiveen												
Kealgorm	109	Trughanacmy	Castleisland	Tralee												
Kealid	865	Iraghticonnor	Knockanure	Listowel												
Keam	120	Trughanacmy	O'Brennan	Tralee												
Keeas	439	Dunkerron North	Knockane	Cahersiveen												
Keel	581	Iveragh	Glanbehy	Cahersiveen												
Keel	263	Trughanacmy	Kilgarrylander	Tralee												
Keelnagore	351	Iveragh	Killinane	Cahersiveen												
Keelties	406	Magunihy	Kilnanare	Killarney												
Kells	864	Iveragh	Killinane	Cahersiveen												
**Kenmare**	Town	Glanarought	Kenmare	Kenmare												
Kenmare	268	Glanarought	Kenmare	Kenmare												
Kenmare Old	253	Glanarought	Kenmare	Kenmare												
Kerries East	309	Trughanacmy	Clogherbrien	Tralee												
Kerries West	268	Trughanacmy	Clogherbrien	Tralee												
Kilbaha Middle	238	Iraghticonnor	Murher	Listowel												
Kilbaha North	441	Iraghticonnor	Murher	Listowel												
Kilbaha South	258	Iraghticonnor	Murher	Listowel												
Kilbaha West	155	Iraghticonnor	Murher	Listowel												
Kilballylahiff	712	Corkaguiny	Killiney	Dingle												
Kilbane	291	Trughanacmy	Ballymacelligott	Tralee												
Kilbannivane	550	Trughanacmy	Castleisland	Tralee												
Kilbeg East	99	Iveragh	Valencia	Cahersiveen												
Kilbeg West	97	Iveragh	Valencia	Cahersiveen												
Kilberehert	63	Trughanacmy	Ballincuslane	Tralee												
Kilbonane	228	Magunihy	Kilbonane	Killarney												
Kilbrean Beg	167	Magunihy	Kilcummin	Killarney												
Kilbrean More	301	Magunihy	Killarney	Killarney												
Kilbreanbeg	198	Magunihy	Aghadoe	Killarney												
Kilbrickane	135	Clanmaurice	Killahan	Tralee												
Kilbunow	513	Glanarought	Kilgarvan	Kenmare												
Kilburn	133	Trughanacmy	Kilcolman	Killarney												
Kilcarra Beg	241	Clanmaurice	Duagh	Listowel												
Kilcarra More	308	Clanmaurice	Duagh	Listowel												
Kilclogherane	257	Magunihy	Kilbonane	Killarney												
Kilcock Lower	242	Iraghticonnor	Lisselton	Listowel												
Kilcock Upper	291	Iraghticonnor	Lisselton	Listowel												
Kilcolgan Lower	388	Iraghticonnor	Kilnaughtin	Glin												
Kilcolgan Upper	249	Iraghticonnor	Kilnaughtin	Glin												
Kilcolman	366	Iraghticonnor	Aghavallen	Listowel												
Kilcolman	224	Trughanacmy	Kilcolman	Killarney												
Kilcolman	77	Corkaguiny	Marhin	Dingle												
Kilcoman	505	Iveragh	Caher	Cahersiveen												
Kilconly North	130	Iraghticonnor	Kilconly	Listowel												
Kilconly South	212	Iraghticonnor	Kilconly	Listowel												
Kilcoolaght	43	Magunihy	Killarney	Killarney												
Kilcoolaght East	182	Dunkerron North	Killorglin	Killarney												
Kilcoolaght West	413	Dunkerron North	Killorglin	Killarney												
Kilcooly	393	Corkaguiny	Kilmalkedar	Dingle												
Kilcooly North	229	Clanmaurice	Kilmoyly	Tralee												
Kilcooly South	187	Clanmaurice	Kilmoyly	Tralee												
Kilcow	736	Trughanacmy	Dysert	Tralee												
Kilcreen	47	Clanmaurice	Finuge	Listowel												
Kilcummin Beg	637	Corkaguiny	Killiney	Dingle												
Kilcummin More	290	Corkaguiny	Killiney	Dingle												
Kilcurrane East	665	Glanarought	Kenmare	Kenmare												
Kilcurrane West	160	Glanarought	Kenmare	Kenmare												
Kilcusnaun	739	Trughanacmy	Ballincuslane	Tralee												
Kilderry North	268	Trughanacmy	Kilcolman	Killarney												
Kilderry South	170	Trughanacmy	Kilcolman	Killarney												
Kildreelig	420	Iveragh	Prior	Cahersiveen												
Kilduff	539	Corkaguiny	Ballinvoher	Dingle												
Kilduff	229	Trughanacmy	O'Brennan	Tralee												
Kildurrihy East	237	Corkaguiny	Ventry	Dingle												
Kildurrihy West	269	Corkaguiny	Ventry	Dingle												
Kilfadda Beg	213	Glanarought	Kilgarvan	Kenmare												
Kilfadda More	429	Glanarought	Kilgarvan	Kenmare												
Kilfallinga	633	Trughanacmy	Currans	Killarney												
Kilfarnoge	247	Corkaguiny	Ventry	Dingle												
Kilfeighny North	306	Clanmaurice	Kilfeighny	Listowel												
Kilfeighny South	445	Clanmaurice	Kilfeighny	Listowel												
Kilfelim	179	Trughanacmy	Killeentierna	Killarney												
Kilfenora	123	Trughanacmy	Ardfert	Tralee												
**Kilflyn**	Town	Clanmaurice	Kilflyn	Listowel												
Kilfountan	359	Corkaguiny	Kildrum	Dingle												
Kilgarriv	529	Glanarought	Kilgarvan	Kenmare												
**Kilgarvan**	Town	Glanarought	Kilgarvan	Kenmare												
Kilgarvan	1,176	Iraghticonnor	Lisselton	Listowel												
Kilgobnet	271	Dunkerron North	Knockane	Killarney												
Kilgortaree	412	Glanarought	Kenmare	Kenmare												
Kilgulbin East	555	Clanmaurice	O'Dorney	Tralee												
Kilgulbin West	456	Clanmaurice	O'Dorney	Tralee												
Kilkeana	645	Glanarought	Kenmare	Kenmare												
Kilkeaveragh	231	Iveragh	Killemlagh	Cahersiveen												
Kilkeehagh	653	Iveragh	Glanbehy	Cahersiveen												
Kilkerry	101	Trughanacmy	Ballymacelligott	Tralee												
Kilkneedan	111	Magunihy	Kilcredane	Killarney												
Kill	699	Dunkerron North	Knockane	Killarney												
Kill	30	Clanmaurice	Ardfert	Tralee												
Killabunane	563	Glanarought	Kilcaskan	Kenmare												
Killabuonia	696	Iveragh	Killemlagh	Cahersiveen												
Killaclohane	509	Trughanacmy	Kilcolman	Killarney												
Killacrim	211	Iraghticonnor	Dysert	Listowel												
Killagurteen	338	Iveragh	Dromod	Cahersiveen												
Killaha	279	Magunihy	Killaha	Killarney												
Killaha East	459	Glanarought	Tuosist	Kenmare												
Killaha West	581	Glanarought	Tuosist	Kenmare												
Killahan	352	Clanmaurice	Killahan	Tralee												
Killahane	147	Magunihy	Molahiffe	Killarney												
Killalee	116	Magunihy	Aghadoe	Killarney												
Killally	148	Trughanacmy	Castleisland	Tralee												
Killanoordrane	143	Corkaguiny	Ballyduff	Dingle												
Killarida	511	Iraghticonnor	Rattoo	Listowel												
**Killarney**	Town	Magunihy	Killarney	Killarney												
Killarney	41	Magunihy	Killarney	Killarney												
Killaspicktarvin	386	Clanmaurice	Kiltomy	Listowel												
Killeacle	383	Clanmaurice	Kilmoyly	Tralee												
Killeagh	685	Magunihy	Molahiffe	Killarney												
Killeagh	155	Trughanacmy	Kiltallagh	Tralee												
Killeen	697	Magunihy	Killaha	Killarney												
Killeen	367	Magunihy	Aghadoe	Killarney												
Killeen	141	Trughanacmy	Tralee	Tralee												
Killeen	120	Dunkerron South	Kilcrohane	Kenmare												
Killeenafinnane	317	Trughanacmy	Kiltallagh	Tralee												
Killeenagh	465	Corkaguiny	Ballinvoher	Dingle												
Killeenleagh	596	Iveragh	Dromod	Cahersiveen												
Killeens	253	Trughanacmy	Currans	Killarney												
Killeentierna	565	Trughanacmy	Killeentierna	Killarney												
Killegane	129	Trughanacmy	Castleisland	Tralee												
Killegy Lower	146	Magunihy	Killarney	Killarney												
Killegy Upper	303	Magunihy	Killarney	Killarney												
Killehenny	286	Iraghticonnor	Killehenny	Listowel												
Killelan East	353	Iveragh	Caher	Cahersiveen												
Killelan West	324	Iveragh	Caher	Cahersiveen												
Killelane	105	Corkaguiny	Dingle	Dingle												
Killelton	1,007	Corkaguiny	Kilgobban	Tralee												
Killeton	192	Iraghticonnor	Aghavallen	Listowel												
Killierisk	48	Trughanacmy	Ratass	Tralee												
**Killiney**	Town	Corkaguiny	Killiney	Dingle												
Killiney	817	Corkaguiny	Killiney	Dingle												
Killoe	612	Iveragh	Caher	Cahersiveen												
Killognaveen North	178	Iveragh	Killinane	Cahersiveen												
Killognaveen South	396	Iveragh	Killinane	Cahersiveen												
Killogrone	340	Iveragh	Caher	Cahersiveen												
Killoluaig	704	Iveragh	Killemlagh	Cahersiveen												
Killomeerhoe	143	Iraghticonnor	Lisselton	Listowel												
Killonecaha	227	Iveragh	Killemlagh	Cahersiveen												
Killorane	69	Clanmaurice	Ardfert	Tralee												
**Killorglin**	Town	Trughanacmy	Killorglin	Killarney												
Killoughane	246	Dunkerron North	Knockane	Killarney												
Killowen	301	Glanarought	Kenmare	Kenmare												
Killurly	733	Iveragh	Prior	Cahersiveen												
Killurly Commons	2,276	Iveragh	Killinane	Cahersiveen												
Killurly East	340	Iveragh	Killinane	Cahersiveen												
Killurly West	383	Iveragh	Killinane	Cahersiveen												
Kilmackerrin East	633	Iveragh	Dromod	Cahersiveen												
Kilmackerrin West	611	Iveragh	Dromod	Cahersiveen												
Kilmakilloge	342	Glanarought	Tuosist	Kenmare												
Kilmalkedar	393	Corkaguiny	Kilmalkedar	Dingle												
Kilmaniheen East	828	Trughanacmy	Brosna	Tralee												
Kilmaniheen West	899	Trughanacmy	Brosna	Tralee												
Kilmeany	869	Iraghticonnor	Knockanure	Listowel												
Kilmore	1,598	Corkaguiny	Ballyduff	Dingle												
Kilmore	590	Clanmaurice	Killury	Listowel												
Kilmore	330	Trughanacmy	O'Brennan	Tralee												
Kilmoyly North	161	Clanmaurice	Kilmoyly	Tralee												
Kilmoyly South	350	Clanmaurice	Kilmoyly	Tralee												
Kilmulhane	152	Iraghticonnor	Killehenny	Listowel												
Kilmurrily	206	Iraghticonnor	Kilnaughtin	Glin												
Kilmurry	398	Trughanacmy	Ballincuslane	Tralee												
Kilmurry	298	Glanarought	Kenmare	Kenmare												
Kilmurry	200	Corkaguiny	Ballyduff	Dingle												
Kilmurry	50	Corkaguiny	Minard	Dingle												
Kilnabrack Lower	459	Iveragh	Glanbehy	Cahersiveen												
Kilnabrack Upper	629	Iveragh	Glanbehy	Cahersiveen												
Kilnaglearagh	80	Corkaguiny	Garfinny	Dingle												
Kilnanare	387	Magunihy	Kilnanare	Killarney												
Kilnarovanagh	326	Magunihy	Kilbonane	Killarney												
Kilpadder	73	Glanarought	Kilgarvan	Kenmare												
Kilpaddoge	415	Iraghticonnor	Kilnaughtin	Glin												
Kilpatrick	148	Glanarought	Kenmare	Kenmare												
Kilquane	1,048	Trughanacmy	Ballincuslane	Tralee												
Kilquane	546	Magunihy	Kilcummin	Killarney												
Kilquane	268	Corkaguiny	Kilquane	Dingle												
Kilquane	133	Trughanacmy	Ballymacelligott	Tralee												
Kilsallagh	92	Trughanacmy	Nohaval	Tralee												
Kilsarkan East	665	Trughanacmy	Dysert	Tralee												
Kilsarkan West	582	Trughanacmy	Dysert	Tralee												
Kilshannig	575	Corkaguiny	Killiney	Dingle												
Kilshenane	181	Clanmaurice	Kilshenane	Listowel												
Kilteean	581	Iraghticonnor	Galey	Listowel												
Kilteenbane	1,186	Corkaguiny	Kilgobban	Tralee												
Kiltomy	117	Clanmaurice	Kiltomy	Listowel												
Kilvickadownig	421	Corkaguiny	Ventry	Dingle												
Kimego East	1,019	Iveragh	Caher	Cahersiveen												
Kimego West	695	Iveragh	Caher	Cahersiveen												
Kinard East	400	Iveragh	Prior	Cahersiveen												
Kinard East	358	Corkaguiny	Kinard	Dingle												
Kinard West	525	Iveragh	Prior	Cahersiveen												
Kinard West	175	Corkaguiny	Kinard	Dingle												
Kineigh	796	Iveragh	Dromod	Cahersiveen												
Kingsland	329	Iraghticonnor	Duagh	Listowel												
**Knight's Town**	Town	Iveragh	Valencia	Cahersiveen												
Knockacappul	355	Magunihy	Kilcummin	Killarney												
Knockachur	721	Trughanacmy	Ballincuslane	Tralee												
Knockaclare	797	Clanmaurice	Kilfeighny	Listowel												
Knockaclogher	67	Trughanacmy	Ardfert	Tralee												
Knockaclogher	51	Trughanacmy	Clogherbrien	Tralee												
Knockacullig North	809	Magunihy	Kilcummin	Killarney												
Knockacullig South	333	Magunihy	Kilcummin	Killarney												
Knockacurrane	126	Corkaguiny	Stradbally	Dingle												
Knockaderreen	479	Clanmaurice	Duagh	Listowel												
Knockaderry	379	Magunihy	Molahiffe	Killarney												
Knockafreaghaun	741	Trughanacmy	Brosna	Tralee												
Knockagarrane	241	Trughanacmy	Kilcolman	Killarney												
Knockagowna	210	Magunihy	Kilbonane	Killarney												
Knockalibade	548	Magunihy	Kilcummin	Killarney												
Knockalougha	1,244	Clanmaurice	Duagh	Listowel												
Knockamoohane	207	Clanmaurice	Finuge	Listowel												
Knockanacuig	49	Trughanacmy	Tralee	Tralee												
Knockananlig	115	Trughanacmy	Castleisland	Tralee												
Knockananore	200	Clanmaurice	Rattoo	Listowel												
Knockanarroor	541	Magunihy	Aghadoe	Killarney												
Knockanasig	194	Clanmaurice	Finuge	Listowel												
Knockane	616	Iraghticonnor	Listowel	Listowel												
Knockane	290	Clanmaurice	Ballyheige	Tralee												
Knockaneacoolteen	723	Magunihy	Currans	Killarney												
Knockaneden	399	Iveragh	Killinane	Cahersiveen												
Knockaneroe	159	Clanmaurice	Duagh	Listowel												
Knockanes	606	Magunihy	Killaha	Killarney												
Knockaneyouloo	968	Iveragh	Killinane	Cahersiveen												
Knockanimrish	307	Magunihy	Killaha	Killarney												
Knockaninane East	937	Magunihy	Killarney	Killarney												
Knockaninane West	777	Magunihy	Killarney	Killarney												
Knockannagore	172	Trughanacmy	Castleisland	Tralee												
Knockanoulort	191	Magunihy	Kilcredane	Killarney												
Knockanruddig	1,077	Glanarought	Kilgarvan	Kenmare												
Knockanuha	626	Glanarought	Kilgarvan	Kenmare												
Knockanush East	446	Trughanacmy	Clogherbrien	Tralee												
Knockanush West	489	Trughanacmy	Clogherbrien	Tralee												
Knockardtry	547	Trughanacmy	Castleisland	Tralee												
Knockariddane	88	Trughanacmy	O'Brennan	Tralee												
Knockariddera	1,757	Trughanacmy	Castleisland	Tralee												
Knockasarnet	298	Magunihy	Aghadoe	Killarney												
Knockataggle Beg	247	Magunihy	Kilcummin	Killarney												
Knockataggle More	1,052	Magunihy	Kilcummin	Killarney												
Knockatarriv	293	Trughanacmy	Ballymacelligott	Tralee												
Knockatee	668	Trughanacmy	Ballincuslane	Tralee												
Knockaunacurraheen	69	Clanmaurice	Dysert	Listowel												
Knockaunatee	234	Trughanacmy	Castleisland	Tralee												
Knockaunbrack	493	Clanmaurice	Duagh	Listowel												
Knockauncore	268	Magunihy	Kilcummin	Killarney												
Knockauncurragh	1,705	Trughanacmy	Ballincuslane	Tralee												
Knockaunglass	128	Iveragh	Killorglin	Killarney												
Knockaunmore	100	Clanmaurice	O'Dorney	Tralee												
Knockaunnacuddoge	171	Magunihy	Killaha	Killarney												
Knockaunnanoon	518	Clanmaurice	Duagh	Listowel												
Knockaunroe	83	Iveragh	Killorglin	Killarney												
Knockaunrory	78	Iveragh	Caher	Cahersiveen												
Knockavaghig	176	Clanmaurice	Rattoo	Listowel												
Knockavallig	194	Clanmaurice	Duagh	Listowel												
Knockavinnane	136	Trughanacmy	Ballymacelligott	Tralee												
Knockavota	355	Trughanacmy	Kilcolman	Killarney												
Knockavrogeen East	290	Corkaguiny	Kildrum	Dingle												
Knockavrogeen West	291	Corkaguiny	Kildrum	Dingle												
Knockavurra Glebe	115	Clanmaurice	Ardfert	Tralee												
Knockawaddra East	111	Trughanacmy	Ratass	Tralee												
Knockawaddra Middle	88	Trughanacmy	Ratass	Tralee												
Knockawaddra West	174	Trughanacmy	Ratass	Tralee												
Knockawinna	905	Trughanacmy	Brosna	Tralee												
Knockbrack	1,328	Trughanacmy	Brosna	Tralee												
Knockbrack	704	Magunihy	Molahiffe	Killarney												
Knockbrack	127	Clanmaurice	Kilmoyly	Tralee												
Knockbrack East	75	Clanmaurice	Kilflyn	Tralee												
Knockbrack West	261	Clanmaurice	Kilflyn	Tralee												
Knockburrane	365	Clanmaurice	Kilfeighny	Listowel												
Knockdoorah	755	Magunihy	Kilcummin	Killarney												
Knockdown	658	Trughanacmy	Ballincuslane	Tralee												
Knockduff	551	Glanarought	Kilcaskan	Kenmare												
Knockeanagh	469	Magunihy	Killarney	Killarney												
Knockeanagh	434	Trughanacmy	Ardfert	Tralee												
Knockeen	337	Trughanacmy	Castleisland	Tralee												
Knockeen	67	Corkaguiny	Dingle	Dingle												
Knockeenawaddra	158	Iveragh	Killemlagh	Cahersiveen												
Knockeencreen	540	Trughanacmy	Brosna	Tralee												
Knockeenduff	367	Magunihy	Aghadoe	Killarney												
Knockeennagowan	345	Magunihy	Aghadoe	Killarney												
Knockeennahone	829	Trughanacmy	Ballincuslane	Tralee												
Knockeennalicka	133	Magunihy	Kilcummin	Killarney												
Knockeens	1,038	Glanarought	Kilgarvan	Kenmare												
Knockenagh North	236	Iraghticonnor	Galey	Listowel												
Knockenagh South	332	Iraghticonnor	Galey	Listowel												
Knockercreeveen	163	Clanmaurice	Rattoo	Listowel												
Knockglass Beg	166	Corkaguiny	Kilgobban	Tralee												
Knockglass More	289	Corkaguiny	Kilgobban	Tralee												
Knockmanagh	471	Magunihy	Kilcummin	Killarney												
Knockmanagh	261	Magunihy	Killarney	Killarney												
Knockmeal	446	Clanmaurice	Duagh	Listowel												
Knocknaboola	785	Dunkerron North	Killorglin	Killarney												
Knocknaboul	1,274	Trughanacmy	Ballincuslane	Tralee												
Knocknabro	1,465	Magunihy	Killaha	Killarney												
Knocknacaheragh	502	Iraghticonnor	Duagh	Listowel												
Knocknacaska	747	Clanmaurice	O'Dorney	Tralee												
Knocknacree	154	Clanmaurice	Rattoo	Listowel												
Knocknacrohy	302	Clanmaurice	Duagh	Listowel												
Knocknacurra	232	Trughanacmy	O'Brennan	Tralee												
Knocknadarriv	1,517	Trughanacmy	Ballincuslane	Tralee												
Knocknagashel East	436	Trughanacmy	Castleisland	Tralee												
Knocknagashel West	2,102	Trughanacmy	Castleisland	Tralee												
Knocknageeha	430	Magunihy	Kilcummin	Killarney												
Knocknaglogh	983	Clanmaurice	Kilshenane	Listowel												
Knocknagoum	573	Trughanacmy	O'Brennan	Tralee												
Knocknagowan	1,367	Magunihy	Killaha	Killarney												
Knocknagower	67	Corkaguiny	Ballyduff	Dingle												
Knocknagun	135	Clanmaurice	O'Dorney	Tralee												
Knocknahaha	169	Trughanacmy	Clogherbrien	Tralee												
Knocknahila	86	Clanmaurice	Kilflyn	Tralee												
Knocknahoe	468	Magunihy	Killarney	Killarney												
Knocknahow	147	Corkaguiny	Kildrum	Dingle												
Knocknakilly	180	Clanmaurice	Kilfeighny	Listowel												
Knocknamucklagh	323	Magunihy	Kilnanare	Killarney												
Knocknan	289	Magunihy	Kilbonane	Killarney												
Knocknanarney	156	Trughanacmy	Ballynahaglish	Tralee												
Knocknaseed	353	Magunihy	Nohavaldaly	Killarney												
Knocknaskeha	418	Magunihy	Killarney	Killarney												
Knockognoe	252	Trughanacmy	Brosna	Tralee												
Knockowen	449	Glanarought	Tuosist	Kenmare												
Knockreagh	448	Trughanacmy	Ballincuslane	Tralee												
Knockreagh	400	Magunihy	Kilcolman	Killarney												
Knockreagh	231	Clanmaurice	Kilshenane	Listowel												
Knockreagh	173	Clanmaurice	O'Dorney	Tralee												
Knockreagh	115	Clanmaurice	Kilfeighny	Listowel												
Knockreer	436	Magunihy	Aghadoe	Killarney												
Knockroe	574	Iveragh	Dromod	Cahersiveen												
Knockroe	108	Clanmaurice	Ardfert	Tralee												
Knockrower East	1,086	Trughanacmy	Ballincuslane	Tralee												
Knockrower West	799	Trughanacmy	Ballincuslane	Tralee												
Knockundervaul	500	Clanmaurice	Duagh	Listowel												
Knockyeala	848	Trughanacmy	Ballincuslane	Tralee												
Knockyline	89	Trughanacmy	Killorglin	Killarney												
Knockysheehan	493	Magunihy	Aghadoe	Killarney												
Knoppoge	573	Iveragh	Dromod	Cahersiveen												
Knoppoge	391	Clanmaurice	Killury	Listowel												
Knoppoge	329	Magunihy	Aghadoe	Killarney												
Knoppoge	281	Trughanacmy	Brosna	Tralee												
Knoppoge North	181	Clanmaurice	Rattoo	Listowel												
Knoppoge South	161	Clanmaurice	Rattoo	Listowel												
Kylatallin	143	Iraghticonnor	Aghavallen	Listowel												
Kylebeg	132	Trughanacmy	Ballymacelligott	Tralee												
Kylebwee	484	Iraghticonnor	Listowel	Listowel												
Lack	1,765	Corkaguiny	Ballinvoher	Dingle												
Lacka	766	Dunkerron South	Templenoe	Kenmare												
Lacka Beg	390	Clanmaurice	O'Dorney	Tralee												
Lacka East	514	Iraghticonnor	Duagh	Listowel												
Lacka East	180	Iraghticonnor	Lisselton	Listowel												
Lacka East	38	Clanmaurice	Rattoo	Listowel												
Lacka More	527	Clanmaurice	O'Dorney	Tralee												
Lacka West	508	Clanmaurice	Duagh	Listowel												
Lacka West	172	Iraghticonnor	Lisselton	Listowel												
Lacka West	165	Clanmaurice	Rattoo	Listowel												
Lackabane	591	Trughanacmy	Castleisland	Tralee												
Lackabane	338	Magunihy	Aghadoe	Killarney												
Lackabaun	578	Trughanacmy	Castleisland	Tralee												
Lackaboy	160	Iraghticonnor	Lisselton	Listowel												
Lackanoneen	466	Trughanacmy	Ballincuslane	Tralee												
Lackaroe	608	Glanarought	Kenmare	Kenmare												
Lackbrooder	1,118	Trughanacmy	Ballincuslane	Tralee												
Lackeen	326	Dunkerron South	Templenoe	Kenmare												
Laghtacallow	184	Trughanacmy	Kilgarrylander	Tralee												
Laharan	863	Trughanacmy	Killorglin	Killarney												
Laharan	287	Magunihy	Kilbonane	Killarney												
Laharan	250	Trughanacmy	Kiltallagh	Tralee												
Laharan	218	Trughanacmy	Killeentierna	Killarney												
Laharan	176	Magunihy	Aglish	Killarney												
Laharan	142	Trughanacmy	Ratass	Tralee												
Laharan	121	Iveragh	Valencia	Cahersiveen												
Laharan North	318	Iveragh	Caher	Cahersiveen												
Laharan South	1,387	Iveragh	Caher	Cahersiveen												
Lahard	721	Magunihy	Kilbonane	Killarney												
Lahardane	413	Iraghticonnor	Killehenny	Listowel												
Laherfree	102	Corkaguiny	Ventry	Dingle												
Lahesheragh North	359	Iraghticonnor	Lisselton	Listowel												
Lahesheragh South	196	Iraghticonnor	Lisselton	Listowel												
Lamb Island	2	Iveragh	Caher	Cahersiveen												
Lamb Island	1	Magunihy	Aghadoe	Killarney												
Lamb's Island	10	Dunkerron South	Kilcrohane	Cahersiveen												
Larha	873	Iraghticonnor	Aghavallen	Listowel												
Larha	33	Clanmaurice	Ardfert	Tralee												
Lassaboy	608	Trughanacmy	Kilgarrylander	Tralee												
Lateeve	790	Iveragh	Killemlagh	Cahersiveen												
Lateeve Beg	274	Corkaguiny	Kilmalkedar	Dingle												
Lateeve More	340	Corkaguiny	Kilmalkedar	Dingle												
Lateevemanagh	298	Corkaguiny	Kilmalkedar	Dingle												
Lauhir	266	Iveragh	Glanbehy	Killarney												
Lauragh Lower	155	Glanarought	Tuosist	Kenmare												
Lauragh Upper	383	Glanarought	Tuosist	Kenmare												
Leabaleaha	314	Iveragh	Prior	Cahersiveen												
Leagh	191	Clanmaurice	Rattoo	Listowel												
Leagh Marshes	87	Clanmaurice	Rattoo	Listowel												
Leaha	324	Trughanacmy	Ballincuslane	Tralee												
Leamirlea	265	Corkaguiny	Kilmalkedar	Dingle												
Leamnaguila	707	Magunihy	Kilcredane	Killarney												
Leampreaghane	399	Clanmaurice	Kilfeighny	Listowel												
Leamydoody	317	Trughanacmy	Ballincuslane	Tralee												
Leamyglissane	624	Magunihy	Kilcummin	Killarney												
Leamyglissane	189	Magunihy	Aghadoe	Killarney												
Leanamore	1,435	Iraghticonnor	Aghavallen	Listowel												
Leansaghane	208	Iraghticonnor	Kilconly	Listowel												
Leath East	728	Trughanacmy	Ratass	Tralee												
Leath West	281	Trughanacmy	Ratass	Tralee												
Lecarhoo	337	Magunihy	Kilnanare	Killarney												
Lehid	683	Glanarought	Tuosist	Kenmare												
Lehid	218	Iveragh	Killemlagh	Cahersiveen												
Leitrim East	609	Iraghticonnor	Murher	Glin												
Leitrim Middle	644	Iraghticonnor	Murher	Glin												
Leitrim West	535	Iraghticonnor	Murher	Glin												
**Lerrig**	Town	Clanmaurice	Kilmoyly	Tralee												
Lerrig North	495	Clanmaurice	Kilmoyly	Tralee												
Lerrig South	468	Clanmaurice	Kilmoyly	Tralee												
Letter	1,301	Dunkerron South	Templenoe	Kenmare												
Letter	683	Iveragh	Caher	Cahersiveen												
Letter	111	Iraghticonnor	Aghavallen	Listowel												
Letter East	215	Iveragh	Glanbehy	Cahersiveen												
Letter Lower	367	Glanarought	Kenmare	Kenmare												
Letter Upper	407	Glanarought	Kenmare	Kenmare												
Letter West	1,770	Iveragh	Glanbehy	Cahersiveen												
Lettercannon	998	Glanarought	Kilgarvan	Kenmare												
Letterdunane	350	Glanarought	Kilcaskan	Kenmare												
Letterfinish	382	Dunkerron South	Kilcrohane	Kenmare												
Lettergarriv	951	Dunkerron South	Knockane	Cahersiveen												
Lettermoneel	311	Dunkerron South	Kilcrohane	Kenmare												
Letternadarriv	706	Dunkerron South	Kilcrohane	Kenmare												
Lickeen	570	Iveragh	Glanbehy	Cahersiveen												
Lisbabe	554	Magunihy	Aghadoe	Killarney												
Lisbane	454	Iveragh	Killinane	Cahersiveen												
Liscahane	915	Trughanacmy	Ardfert	Tralee												
Liscarney	182	Corkaguiny	Ballyduff	Dingle												
Liscullane	371	Clanmaurice	Kilcaragh	Listowel												
Liscullane	219	Clanmaurice	Kiltomy	Listowel												
Lisdargan	902	Corkaguiny	Cloghane	Dingle												
Lisduff	284	Clanmaurice	Killury	Listowel												
Lisheen	788	Magunihy	Nohavaldaly	Killarney												
Lisheenbaun	424	Trughanacmy	Dysert	Tralee												
Lisheennacannina	366	Magunihy	Molahiffe	Killarney												
Lisheennashingane	324	Magunihy	Kilbonane	Killarney												
Lisladraun	53	Iraghticonnor	Lisselton	Listowel												
Lislaughtin	867	Iraghticonnor	Aghavallen	Listowel												
Lisleibane	616	Dunkerron North	Knockane	Killarney												
Lislonane	145	Iveragh	Dromod	Cahersiveen												
Lisloose	180	Trughanacmy	Tralee	Tralee												
Lismacfinnin	187	Magunihy	Killorglin	Killarney												
Lismongane	156	Magunihy	Aghadoe	Killarney												
Lismore	267	Trughanacmy	Ratass	Tralee												
Lisnagoneeny	207	Clanmaurice	Rattoo	Listowel												
Lisnagrave	276	Magunihy	Kilcummin	Killarney												
Lisnagree	103	Corkaguiny	Killiney	Dingle												
Lisnakealwee	922	Corkaguiny	Cloghane	Dingle												
Lisnamovaun	241	Corkaguiny	Cloghane	Dingle												
Lisnanoul	145	Trughanacmy	Kiltallagh	Tralee												
Lisroe	521	Clanmaurice	Duagh	Listowel												
Lisroe	151	Magunihy	Kilcummin	Killarney												
Liss	633	Dunkerron South	Kilcrohane	Kenmare												
Liss Lower	353	Iveragh	Killinane	Cahersiveen												
Liss Upper	81	Iveragh	Killinane	Cahersiveen												
Lissahane	525	Clanmaurice	Kilfeighny	Listowel												
Lissanearla East	235	Trughanacmy	Tralee	Tralee												
Lissanearla West	229	Trughanacmy	Tralee	Tralee												
Lissaniska	767	Iraghticonnor	Knockanure	Listowel												
Lissaniska	231	Glanarought	Kenmare	Kenmare												
Lissardboola	376	Trughanacmy	Ballyseedy	Tralee												
Lissataggle	376	Trughanacmy	Currans	Killarney												
Lissatanvally	153	Trughanacmy	Ratass	Tralee												
Lissatinnig	480	Iveragh	Dromod	Cahersiveen												
Lissavane East	352	Magunihy	Kilbonane	Killarney												
Lissavane West	410	Magunihy	Kilbonane	Killarney	-	Lisselton	410	?	Ballydonaghue	?	-	Lissireen	187	Clanmaurice	Kiltomy	Tralee
Lissodeige	411	Trughanacmy	Ballynahaglish	Tralee												
Lissooleen	28	Trughanacmy	Ballymacelligott	Tralee												
Lissyclearig Lower	196	Glanarought	Kenmare	Kenmare												
Lissyclearig Upper	258	Glanarought	Kenmare	Kenmare												
Lissyconnor	353	Magunihy	Nohavaldaly	Killarney												
Lissycurrig	285	Clanmaurice	Killury	Listowel												
Lissyviggeen	552	Magunihy	Killarney	Killarney												
Listellick North	425	Trughanacmy	Tralee	Tralee												
Listellick South	179	Trughanacmy	Tralee	Tralee												
**Listowel**	Town	Iraghticonnor	Listowel	Listowel												
Listowel	311	Iraghticonnor	Listowel	Listowel												
Listrim	695	Trughanacmy	Ardfert	Tralee												
Listrim	232	Trughanacmy	Ballynahaglish	Tralee												
Listry	717	Magunihy	Kilbonane	Killarney												
Listymurragh	63	Magunihy	Killarney	Killarney												
**Lixnaw**	Town	Clanmaurice	Kiltomy	Listowel												
**Lixnaw**	Town	Clanmaurice	Kilcaragh	Listowel												
Lixnaw	148	Clanmaurice	Kilcaragh	Listowel												
Lohart	482	Glanarought	Tuosist	Kenmare												
Loher	623	Dunkerron South	Kilcrohane	Cahersiveen												
Lohercannan	471	Trughanacmy	Annagh	Tralee												
Lomanagh	588	Glanarought	Kilgarvan	Kenmare												
Lomanagh	363	Iveragh	Killemlagh	Cahersiveen												
Lomanagh North	489	Dunkerron South	Kilcrohane	Kenmare												
Lomanagh South	456	Dunkerron South	Kilcrohane	Kenmare												
Lonart	482	Trughanacmy	Killorglin	Killarney												
Long Island	9	Iveragh	Killemlagh	Cahersiveen												
Longfield	193	Magunihy	Kilnanare	Killarney												
Looscaunagh	523	Dunkerron South	Knockane	Killarney												
Lough	123	Corkaguiny	Garfinny	Dingle												
Loughadoon	203	Corkaguiny	Ballyduff	Dingle												
Loughanes	385	Iraghticonnor	Lisselton	Listowel												
Loughaunacreen	160	Glanarought	Tuosist	Kenmare												
Loughbeg	86	Corkaguiny	Killiney	Dingle												
Lougher	991	Corkaguiny	Ballinvoher	Dingle												
Loughnacappagh	36	Trughanacmy	Ballymacelligott	Tralee												
Loughnagore	146	Trughanacmy	Killeentierna	Killarney												
Lounaghan	1,040	Glanarought	Kilgarvan	Kenmare												
Lugnagappul	148	Corkaguiny	Minard	Dingle												
Lybes	122	Clanmaurice	Duagh	Listowel												
Lyracrumpane	980	Clanmaurice	Kilfeighny	Listowel												
Lyranes Lower	270	Dunkerron North	Knockane	Cahersiveen												
Lyranes Upper	427	Dunkerron North	Knockane	Cahersiveen												
Lyre	561	Trughanacmy	Ballincuslane	Tralee												
Lyre	188	Trughanacmy	Killeentierna	Killarney												
Lyre	187	Magunihy	Kilcolman	Killarney												
Lyre	183	Iraghticonnor	Lisselton	Listowel												
Lyreboy	967	Dunkerron North	Killorglin	Cahersiveen												
Magh East	142	Trughanacmy	Ballymacelligott	Tralee												
Magh West	196	Trughanacmy	Ballymacelligott	Tralee												
Maghanaboe	1,088	Corkaguiny	Ballyduff	Dingle												
Maghancoosaun	199	Dunkerron North	Killorglin	Cahersiveen												
Maghanknockane	982	Trughanacmy	O'Brennan	Tralee												
Maghanlawaun	447	Dunkerron North	Knockane	Killarney												
Maghanveel	1,299	Corkaguiny	Cloghane	Dingle												
Maghasheela	191	Corkaguiny	Killiney	Dingle												
Magherabeg	804	Corkaguiny	Killiney	Dingle												
Magherasrahan	157	Dunkerron North	Knockane	Killarney												
Maghygreenane	2,156	Iveragh	Dromod	Cahersiveen												
Maglass	93	Trughanacmy	Nohaval	Tralee												
Maglass East	235	Trughanacmy	Ballymacelligott	Tralee												
Maglass West	291	Trughanacmy	Ballymacelligott	Tralee												
Mangerton	2,598	Glanarought	Kilgarvan	Kenmare												
Manor East	161	Trughanacmy	Ratass	Tralee												
Manor West	154	Trughanacmy	Ratass	Tralee												
Marhin	748	Corkaguiny	Marhin	Dingle												
Martara	105	Iraghticonnor	Aghavallen	Listowel												
Martara	87	Trughanacmy	Ballymacelligott	Tralee												
Martramane	140	Corkaguiny	Killiney	Dingle												
Mastergeeha	1,109	Magunihy	Kilcummin	Killarney												
Mastergeehy	220	Iveragh	Dromod	Cahersiveen												
Maughantoorig	346	Magunihy	Kilcummin	Killarney												
Maulagallane	601	Dunkerron South	Kilcrohane	Kenmare												
Maulagh	164	Magunihy	Aghadoe	Killarney												
Maulagirkane	195	Iveragh	Dromod	Cahersiveen												
Maulagowna	1,061	Glanarought	Tuosist	Kenmare												
Maulcallee	1,230	Dunkerron South	Kilcrohane	Kenmare												
Maulin	463	Iveragh	Dromod	Cahersiveen												
Maulin	432	Clanmaurice	Ballyheige	Tralee												
Maulnabrack	646	Iveragh	Dromod	Cahersiveen												
Maulnagower	253	Dunkerron South	Templenoe	Kenmare												
Maulnahone	362	Iveragh	Dromod	Cahersiveen												
Maulnahorna	412	Dunkerron South	Templenoe	Kenmare												
Maulyarkane	658	Magunihy	Kilcummin	Killarney												
Maulykevane	522	Magunihy	Kilcummin	Killarney												
Maulyneill	924	Dunkerron South	Templenoe	Kenmare												
Maumagarrane	304	Corkaguiny	Minard	Dingle												
Maumanorig	130	Corkaguiny	Marhin	Dingle												
Maumnahaltora	122	Corkaguiny	Kilgobban	Tralee												
Mausrower	613	Magunihy	Kilcummin	Killarney												
Meallis	1,377	Dunkerron North	Knockane	Killarney												
Meanus	324	Dunkerron North	Knockane	Killarney												
Meanus	309	Trughanacmy	Currans	Killarney												
Meanus	238	Dunkerron North	Killorglin	Killarney												
Meanus	156	Trughanacmy	Castleisland	Tralee												
Meanus	105	Trughanacmy	Kiltallagh	Tralee												
Meelagulleen	234	Iveragh	Prior	Cahersiveen												
Meelcon	164	Iraghticonnor	Kilnaughtin	Glin												
Meelick	520	Glanarought	Kilgarvan	Kenmare												
Meen	552	Iraghticonnor	Listowel	Listowel												
Meenahorna	352	Clanmaurice	Duagh	Listowel												
Meenanare	596	Clanmaurice	Duagh	Listowel												
Meenbannivane	1,473	Trughanacmy	Castleisland	Tralee												
Meenleitrim North	684	Trughanacmy	Castleisland	Tralee												
Meenlietrim South	786	Trughanacmy	Castleisland	Tralee												
Meennagishagh	154	Magunihy	Kilcummin	Killarney												
Meennascarty	147	Corkaguiny	Killiney	Dingle												
Meenogahane	625	Clanmaurice	Killury	Listowel												
Meenscovane	277	Clanmaurice	Duagh	Listowel												
Meentoges	394	Magunihy	Kilcummin	Killarney												
Meenyvoughaun	567	Trughanacmy	Brosna	Tralee												
Milleens	305	Glanarought	Kilcaskan	Kenmare												
**Milltown**	Town	Trughanacmy	Kilcolman	Killarney												
Milltown	391	Corkaguiny	Dingle	Dingle												
Milltown	207	Clanmaurice	O'Dorney	Tralee												
Milltown	54	Trughanacmy	Kilcolman	Killarney												
Milltown, Commons of	58	Corkaguiny	Dingle	Dingle												
Minard East	147	Corkaguiny	Minard	Dingle												
Minard West	510	Corkaguiny	Minard	Dingle												
Minish	522	Magunihy	Killarney	Killarney												
Moanmore	195	Trughanacmy	Castleisland	Tralee												
Moher	225	Iraghticonnor	Murher	Glin												
Monacappa	43	Corkaguiny	Dingle	Dingle												
Monaree	183	Corkaguiny	Kildrum	Dingle												
Monavally	40	Trughanacmy	Tralee	Tralee												
Monearmore	21	Magunihy	Killarney	Killarney												
Moneyduff	54	Iveragh	Caher	Cahersiveen												
Moneyflugh	1,249	Dunkerron South	Kilcrohane	Kenmare												
Montanagay	146	Clanmaurice	O'Dorney	Tralee												
Monument	104	Clanmaurice	Kilcaragh	Listowel												
Moohane	127	Iraghticonnor	Killehenny	Listowel												
Moorestown	265	Corkaguiny	Kilquane	Dingle												
Moularostig	195	Dunkerron South	Kilcrohane	Kenmare												
Mountcoal	595	Clanmaurice	Kilshenane	Listowel												
Mounthawk	132	Trughanacmy	Tralee	Tralee												
Mounthenry	135	Magunihy	Kilnanare	Killarney												
Mountluke	117	Iveragh	Caher	Cahersiveen												
Mountnicholas	108	Trughanacmy	Ballymacelligott	Tralee												
Mountoven	392	Corkaguiny	Kilgobban	Tralee												
Moyassa	315	Clanmaurice	Finuge	Listowel												
Moybella North	458	Iraghticonnor	Lisselton	Listowel												
Moybella South	314	Iraghticonnor	Lisselton	Listowel												
Moyeightragh	70	Magunihy	Killarney	Killarney												
Moylaun Island	12	Dunkerron South	Kilcrohane	Cahersiveen												
Moyleglass	520	Dunkerron North	Knockane	Killarney												
Moynsha	96	Clanmaurice	Duagh	Listowel												
Moyrisk	303	Iveragh	Killemlagh	Cahersiveen												
Moyvane North	447	Iraghticonnor	Murher	Listowel												
Moyvane South	422	Iraghticonnor	Murher	Listowel												
Muckenagh	611	Clanmaurice	Kiltomy	Listowel												
Muckenagh	318	Clanmaurice	Kilfeighny	Listowel												
Muckera	329	Glanarought	Tuosist	Kenmare												
Muckross	759	Magunihy	Killarney	Killarney												
Mucksna	705	Glanarought	Kenmare	Kenmare												
Muing East	52	Trughanacmy	Ratass	Tralee												
Muing West	78	Trughanacmy	Ratass	Tralee												
Muingagarha	118	Dunkerron North	Knockane	Killarney												
Muingaphuca	662	Iveragh	Killorglin	Killarney												
Muingatlaunlush	325	Trughanacmy	O'Brennan	Tralee												
Muingavrannig	94	Trughanacmy	O'Brennan	Tralee												
Muingnaminnane	1,019	Trughanacmy	Ballymacelligott	Tralee												
Muingnatee	230	Trughanacmy	Ballymacelligott	Tralee												
Muingvautia	710	Trughanacmy	Castleisland	Tralee												
Muingwee	287	Clanmaurice	Duagh	Listowel												
Muingydowda	156	Iveragh	Prior	Cahersiveen												
Mullaghmarky	406	Trughanacmy	Castleisland	Tralee												
Mullaghveal	1,362	Corkaguiny	Cloghane	Dingle												
Mullen	833	Trughanacmy	Ballincuslane	Tralee												
Mullenaglemig	134	Corkaguiny	Dingle	Dingle												
Murher	583	Iraghticonnor	Murher	Listowel												
Murreagh	773	Iveragh	Dromod	Cahersiveen												
Murreagh	379	Corkaguiny	Kilmalkedar	Dingle												
Murrirrigane	730	Corkaguiny	Cloghane	Dingle												
Mweelcaha	131	Dunkerron North	Knockane	Killarney												
Mweelin	79	Iveragh	Prior	Cahersiveen												
Mweelinroe	38	Trughanacmy	Ballymacelligott	Tralee												
Mweennalaa	253	Trughanacmy	Nohaval	Tralee												
Mweevoo	114	Iraghticonnor	Ballyconry	Listowel												
Mweevuck	200	Iraghticonnor	Ballyconry	Listowel												
Nantinan	568	Magunihy	Killorglin	Killarney												
Nedanone	173	Dunkerron South	Kilcrohane	Kenmare												
Neesha	1,319	Iveragh	Glanbehy	Cahersiveen												
**Newtown Sandes**	Town	Iraghticonnor	Murher	Listowel												
Nohaval North	108	Trughanacmy	Nohaval	Tralee												
Nohaval South	375	Trughanacmy	Nohaval	Tralee												
Nunstown	170	Magunihy	Aghadoe	Killarney												
Oghermong	496	Iveragh	Caher	Cahersiveen												
Oldforge	146	Magunihy	Killarney	Killarney												
Oolagh East	1,072	Dunkerron North	Knockane	Cahersiveen												
Oolagh West	703	Dunkerron North	Knockane	Cahersiveen												
Ormand's Island	19	Glanarought	Tuosist	Kenmare												
Oughtiv	1,048	Iveragh	Dromod	Cahersiveen												
Ownagarry	1,100	Dunkerron North	Killorglin	Killarney												
Paddock	59	Corkaguiny	Kildrum	Dingle												
Pallas	1,078	Clanmaurice	Kilfeighny	Listowel												
Pallis	171	Magunihy	Aghadoe	Killarney												
Park	353	Magunihy	Killarney	Killarney												
Parkalassa	57	Dunkerron North	Killorglin	Killarney												
Parkavonear	124	Magunihy	Aghadoe	Killarney												
Parkboy	81	Trughanacmy	Clogherbrien	Tralee												
Parkearagh	56	Trughanacmy	O'Brennan	Tralee												
Parkmore	59	Clanmaurice	Killahan	Tralee												
Parkmore	43	Clanmaurice	Kiltomy	Tralee												
Parknageragh	243	Clanmaurice	Killahan	Tralee												
Parknamulloge	293	Trughanacmy	Dysert	Tralee												
Parknasmuttaun	159	Trughanacmy	Dysert	Killarney												
Patch	143	Clanmaurice	Duagh	Listowel												
Pilgramhill	343	Iraghticonnor	Duagh	Listowel												
Pinure	84	Trughanacmy	Clogherbrien	Tralee												
Ploresk	14	Clanmaurice	Kilmoyly	Tralee												
Pluckeen	25	Trughanacmy	Tralee	Tralee												
Pollagh	207	Iraghticonnor	Galey	Listowel												
Portduff	122	Trughanacmy	Castleisland	Tralee												
**Portmagee**	Town	Iveragh	Killemlagh	Cahersiveen												
Portmagee	140	Iveragh	Killemlagh	Cahersiveen												
Potaley	17	Trughanacmy	Ballymacelligott	Tralee												
Poulagower	1,314	Magunihy	Killarney	Killarney												
Poulawaddra	821	Trughanacmy	Ballyseedy	Tralee												
Poulnahaha	110	Iraghticonnor	Dysert	Listowel												
Poulnamuck	81	Magunihy	Killarney	Killarney												
Pound	609	Iveragh	Killemlagh	Cahersiveen												
Puckisland	601	Corkaguiny	Minard	Dingle												
Puffin Island	125	Iveragh	Killemlagh	Cahersiveen												
Pulleen	317	Iraghticonnor	Kilnaughtin	Glin												
Quaybaun	120	Iveragh	Killorglin	Killarney												
Rabbit (or Brown Island)	12	Magunihy	Aghadoe	Killarney												
Racomane East	246	Magunihy	Aglish	Killarney												
Racomane West	262	Magunihy	Aglish	Killarney												
Radrinagh	106	Magunihy	Killarney	Killarney												
Rahanane	508	Magunihy	Kilcummin	Killarney												
Rahavanig	259	Iraghticonnor	Kilconly	Listowel												
Rahealy	215	Clanmaurice	Rattoo	Listowel												
Raheen	501	Magunihy	Kilcummin	Killarney												
Raheen	334	Dunkerron South	Kilcrohane	Cahersiveen												
Raheen	234	Magunihy	Aghadoe	Killarney												
Raheen	92	Corkaguiny	Ventry	Dingle												
Raheens	312	Iveragh	Killinane	Cahersiveen												
Raheenyhooig	121	Corkaguiny	Dingle	Dingle												
Rahinnane	235	Corkaguiny	Ventry	Dingle												
Rahinnane West	305	Corkaguiny	Ventry	Dingle												
Rahoneen	298	Clanmaurice	Ardfert	Tralee												
Rahoonagh	209	Iraghticonnor	Killehenny	Listowel												
Rahoonane	96	Trughanacmy	Tralee	Tralee												
Ralappane	211	Iraghticonnor	Kilnaughtin	Glin												
Ranaleen	375	Trughanacmy	Killeentierna	Killarney												
Ranalough	393	Trughanacmy	Killeentierna	Killarney												
Rangue	576	Trughanacmy	Killorglin	Killarney												
Rareagh	54	Clanmaurice	Kilmoyly	Tralee												
Ratass	128	Trughanacmy	Ratass	Tralee												
Rath	571	Dunkerron South	Kilcrohane	Cahersiveen												
Rath	465	Glanarought	Kilcaskan	Kenmare												
Rath Beg	1,072	Magunihy	Kilcummin	Killarney												
Rath Beg	216	Magunihy	Kilnanare	Killarney												
Rath More	785	Magunihy	Kilcummin	Killarney												
Rathanny	257	Trughanacmy	Ballymacelligott	Tralee												
Rathcrihane	18	Clanmaurice	Ardfert	Tralee												
Rathduff	136	Corkaguiny	Ballinvoher	Dingle												
Rathea	1,665	Clanmaurice	Kilshenane	Listowel												
Rathfield	141	Dunkerron South	Kilcrohane	Cahersiveen												
Rathkenny	508	Clanmaurice	O'Dorney	Tralee												
Rathkieran	295	Iveragh	Killemlagh	Cahersiveen												
Rathmalode	47	Corkaguiny	Ballinvoher	Dingle												
Rathmore	964	Trughanacmy	O'Brennan	Tralee												
Rathmore	235	Magunihy	Kilnanare	Killarney												
Rathmorrel	236	Clanmaurice	Killury	Listowel												
Rathoran	354	Iraghticonnor	Duagh	Listowel												
Rathpoge East	212	Trughanacmy	Kilcolman	Killarney												
Rathpoge West	191	Trughanacmy	Kilcolman	Killarney												
Rathroe	159	Iraghticonnor	Lisselton	Listowel												
Rathscannel	258	Clanmaurice	Killahan	Tralee												
Rattoo	379	Clanmaurice	Rattoo	Listowel												
Rattoo Island	1	Clanmaurice	Rattoo	Listowel												
Rea	259	Iraghticonnor	Duagh	Listowel												
Rea	248	Clanmaurice	Kilflyn	Tralee												
Reaboy	366	Magunihy	Kilcummin	Killarney												
Reacashlagh	232	Dunkerron South	Templenoe	Kenmare												
Reacaslagh	1,224	Trughanacmy	Ballincuslane	Tralee												
Reacaslagh	432	Iveragh	Killinane	Cahersiveen												
Readrinagh	376	Magunihy	Kilcummin	Killarney												
Reanagowan	1,093	Trughanacmy	Ballymacelligott	Tralee												
Reanasup	870	Magunihy	Nohavaldaly	Killarney												
Reask	259	Corkaguiny	Marhin	Dingle												
Reavaun	423	Magunihy	Killeentierna	Killarney												
Redtrench North	772	Glanarought	Kilgarvan	Kenmare												
Redtrench South	333	Glanarought	Kilgarvan	Kenmare												
Reen	865	Dunkerron South	Templenoe	Kenmare												
Reen	554	Trughanacmy	Killorglin	Killarney												
Reen	283	Magunihy	Killarney	Killarney												
Reenacoola	116	Iveragh	Prior	Cahersiveen												
Reenafardarri	6	Corkaguiny	Killiney	Dingle												
Reenard	647	Iveragh	Caher	Cahersiveen												
Reenbeg	112	Corkaguiny	Dingle	Dingle												
Reenboy	192	Corkaguiny	Cloghane	Dingle												
Reencaheragh	270	Iveragh	Killemlagh	Cahersiveen												
Reenconnell	359	Corkaguiny	Kilmalkedar	Dingle												
Reenearagh	218	Dunkerron South	Kilcrohane	Cahersiveen												
Reenkilla	491	Glanarought	Tuosist	Kenmare												
Reennanallagane	299	Iveragh	Glanbehy	Cahersiveen												
Reenroe	128	Iveragh	Prior	Cahersiveen												
Reenturk	135	Iraghticonnor	Kilnaughtin	Glin												
Rehill	428	Iveragh	Caher	Cahersiveen												
Releagh	816	Glanarought	Kilcaskan	Kenmare												
Rinneen	450	Dunkerron South	Kilcrohane	Cahersiveen												
Roads	637	Iveragh	Killinane	Cahersiveen												
Rockfield	305	Trughanacmy	Ballymacelligott	Tralee												
Rockfield East	435	Magunihy	Kilbonane	Killarney												
Rockfield Middle	315	Magunihy	Kilbonane	Killarney												
Rockfield West	118	Magunihy	Kilbonane	Killarney												
Roscullen Island	56	Trughanacmy	Kilgarrylander	Tralee												
Rosnacartan Beg	170	Magunihy	Kilbonane	Killarney												
Rosnacartan Moreland	159	Magunihy	Kilbonane	Killarney												
Ross Island	158	Magunihy	Killarney	Killarney												
Rossacoosane	1,173	Dunkerron South	Templenoe	Kenmare												
Rossacroo	229	Magunihy	Aghadoe	Killarney												
Rossacroobeg	145	Magunihy	Killaha	Killarney												
Rossacroonaloo	441	Magunihy	Killaha	Killarney												
Rossalia	234	Magunihy	Killaha	Killarney												
Rossanean	300	Magunihy	Killeentierna	Killarney												
Rossanean	273	Magunihy	Molahiffe	Killarney												
Rossard	947	Glanarought	Tuosist	Kenmare												
Rossbehy	980	Iveragh	Glanbehy	Cahersiveen												
Rossboy	173	Glanarought	Kenmare	Kenmare												
Rossdohan	453	Dunkerron South	Kilcrohane	Kenmare												
Rossdohan Island	134	Dunkerron South	Kilcrohane	Kenmare												
Rosseightragh	539	Glanarought	Kilgarvan	Kenmare												
Rossmore	280	Magunihy	Molahiffe	Killarney												
Rossmore Island	318	Dunkerron South	Kilcrohane	Kenmare												
Rossnahowgarry	130	Magunihy	Killarney	Killarney												
Rough Island	1	Magunihy	Killarney	Killarney												
Roxborough	249	Magunihy	Molahiffe	Killarney												
Rusheen	417	Glanarought	Kilgarvan	Kenmare												
Rusheen	415	Magunihy	Kilnanare	Killarney												
Rusheen	286	Magunihy	Molahiffe	Killarney												
Rusheen	214	Iraghticonnor	Aghavallen	Listowel												
Rusheen Beg	231	Magunihy	Killaha	Killarney												
Rusheen More	678	Magunihy	Killaha	Killarney												
Rusheenpark	89	Iraghticonnor	Aghavallen	Listowel												
Rusheens	315	Glanarought	Kenmare	Kenmare												
Rylane	554	Clanmaurice	Duagh	Listowel												
Sackville	382	Clanmaurice	Ardfert	Tralee												
Sallahig	184	Iveragh	Dromod	Cahersiveen												
Samphire Island	1	Trughanacmy	Fenit	Tralee												
Samphire Island Little	1	Trughanacmy	Fenit	Tralee												
Sandhills and Corcas	125	Iraghticonnor	Kilconly	Listowel												
Scariff	366	Dunkerron South	Kilcrohane	Cahersiveen												
Scarriff	321	Iveragh	Dromod	Cahersiveen												
Scart	376	Trughanacmy	Nohaval	Tralee												
Scart	330	Magunihy	Kilcredane	Killarney												
Scart	113	Dunkerron South	Kilcrohane	Kenmare												
**Scartaglin**	Town	Trughanacmy	Castleisland	Tralee												
Scartaglin	687	Trughanacmy	Castleisland	Tralee												
Scarteen	1,211	Dunkerron South	Templenoe	Kenmare												
Scarteen	175	Magunihy	Aghadoe	Killarney												
Scartlea	126	Magunihy	Killarney	Killarney												
Scartleigh	93	Iraghticonnor	Dysert	Listowel												
Scartnamackagh	69	Iveragh	Killorglin	Killarney												
Scraggane	284	Corkaguiny	Stradbally	Dingle												
Scrahan	373	Clanmaurice	Duagh	Listowel												
Scrahanagnave	392	Dunkerron South	Kilcrohane	Kenmare												
Scrahanagullaun	228	Magunihy	Kilcummin	Killarney												
Scrahanaveal	413	Magunihy	Kilcummin	Killarney												
Scrahane	96	Magunihy	Killarney	Killarney												
Scrahanfadda	1,044	Magunihy	Kilcummin	Killarney												
Scrahannagaur	533	Dunkerron South	Kilcrohane	Kenmare												
Scrallaghbeg	153	Corkaguiny	Kilgobban	Tralee												
Seersha	108	Magunihy	Aglish	Killarney												
Shanacashel	641	Dunkerron North	Knockane	Cahersiveen												
Shanacloon	315	Dunkerron North	Knockane	Killarney												
Shanacool	34	Iraghticonnor	Knockanure	Listowel												
Shanafona	186	Clanmaurice	Duagh	Listowel												
Shanahill	929	Trughanacmy	Kilgarrylander	Tralee												
Shanahill East	110	Trughanacmy	Kilgarrylander	Tralee												
Shanakeal	1,234	Trughanacmy	Kilgarrylander	Tralee												
Shanakill	49	Trughanacmy	Tralee	Tralee												
Shanaknock	927	Dunkerron South	Kilcrohane	Cahersiveen												
Shanaknock	149	Trughanacmy	O'Brennan	Tralee												
Shanakyle	76	Corkaguiny	Kilquane	Dingle												
Shanavally	269	Trughanacmy	Ballymacelligott	Tralee												
Shanaway East	176	Iraghticonnor	Kilnaughtin	Glin												
Shanaway West	244	Iraghticonnor	Kilnaughtin	Glin												
Shanawillen	79	Trughanacmy	Killeentierna	Killarney												
Shanbally	183	Clanmaurice	Duagh	Listowel												
Shandrum	393	Glanarought	Kilgarvan	Kenmare												
Shannera Lower	829	Dunkerron North	Killorglin	Cahersiveen												
Shannera Upper	709	Dunkerron North	Killorglin	Cahersiveen												
Shantalliv	115	Corkaguiny	Killiney	Dingle												
Sheans East	252	Magunihy	Aglish	Killarney												
Sheans West	116	Magunihy	Aglish	Killarney												
Sheepwalk	91	Clanmaurice	Rattoo	Listowel												
Sheheree	221	Magunihy	Killarney	Killarney												
Sherky Island	82	Dunkerron South	Kilcrohane	Kenmare												
Shinnagh	772	Magunihy	Nohavaldaly	Killarney												
Shinnagh	477	Glanarought	Tuosist	Kenmare												
Shronaboy	1,165	Magunihy	Killaha	Killarney												
Shronahiree Beg	586	Dunkerron North	Knockane	Cahersiveen												
Shronahiree More	871	Dunkerron North	Knockane	Cahersiveen												
Shronaloughane	785	Iveragh	Dromod	Cahersiveen												
Shrone	148	Magunihy	Kilbonane	Killarney												
Shrone	115	Iraghticonnor	Aghavallen	Listowel												
Shrone Beg	1,110	Magunihy	Kilcummin	Killarney												
Shrone East	203	Iraghticonnor	Galey	Listowel												
Shrone Middle	132	Iraghticonnor	Galey	Listowel												
Shrone More	1,145	Magunihy	Kilcummin	Killarney												
Shrone West	298	Iraghticonnor	Galey	Listowel												
Shronebeirne	412	Iraghticonnor	Duagh	Listowel												
Shronebirrane	1,204	Glanarought	Tuosist	Kenmare												
Shronedarragh	482	Magunihy	Aghadoe	Killarney												
Sillahertane	1,718	Glanarought	Kilgarvan	Kenmare												
Skahanagh	239	Trughanacmy	Ratass	Tralee												
Skahies	305	Magunihy	Molahiffe	Killarney												
Skehanagh	170	Dunkerron South	Kilcrohane	Kenmare												
Skehanierin (Egan)	221	Iraghticonnor	Listowel	Listowel												
Skehanierin (Stokes)	143	Iraghticonnor	Listowel	Listowel												
Skehanierin Lower	73	Iraghticonnor	Listowel	Listowel												
Skellig Rock Great	44	Iveragh	Killemlagh	Cahersiveen												
Skellig Rock Little	16	Iveragh	Killemlagh	Cahersiveen												
Skrillagh	75	Clanmaurice	Ardfert	Tralee												
Slaght	812	Glanarought	Kilgarvan	Kenmare												
Slaheny	760	Glanarought	Kilgarvan	Kenmare												
Sleveen	386	Clanmaurice	Rattoo	Listowel												
Slievadrehid	203	Corkaguiny	Cloghane	Dingle												
Slievaduff	764	Dunkerron South	Templenoe	Kenmare												
Slievawaddra	154	Clanmaurice	Rattoo	Listowel												
Slieve East	1,128	Corkaguiny	Kilgobban	Tralee												
Slieve West	607	Corkaguiny	Kilgobban	Tralee												
Slievebwee	181	Clanmaurice	Killahan	Tralee												
Slievegaura	234	Magunihy	Kilbonane	Killarney												
Slieveglass	485	Corkaguiny	Cloghane	Dingle												
Slievenashaska	1,493	Dunkerron South	Kilcrohane	Kenmare												
Slievenavadoge	185	Trughanacmy	Clogherbrien	Tralee												
Sliss	129	Iraghticonnor	Aghavallen	Listowel												
Sluicequarter	261	Iraghticonnor	Duagh	Listowel												
Smerwick	457	Corkaguiny	Dunurlin	Dingle												
**Sneem**	Town	Dunkerron South	Kilcrohane	Kenmare												
Springmount	279	Trughanacmy	Killeentierna	Killarney												
Spunkane	795	Iveragh	Dromod	Cahersiveen												
Srugreana	366	Iveragh	Killinane	Cahersiveen												
Stack's-mountain	846	Clanmaurice	Kilflyn	Tralee												
Stagmount	708	Magunihy	Kilcummin	Killarney												
Staigue	1,107	Dunkerron South	Kilcrohane	Kenmare												
Stealroe	140	Trughanacmy	Killorglin	Killarney												
**Stradbally**	Town	Corkaguiny	Stradbally	Dingle												
Stradbally Mountain	593	Corkaguiny	Stradbally	Dingle												
Strandsend	113	Iveragh	Killinane	Cahersiveen												
Sussa	717	Iveragh	Prior	Cahersiveen												
**Tahilla**	Town	Dunkerron South	Kilcrohane	Kenmare												
Tahilla	352	Dunkerron South	Kilcrohane	Kenmare												
**Tarbert**	Town	Iraghticonnor	Kilnaughtin	Glin												
Tarbert	367	Iraghticonnor	Kilnaughtin	Glin												
Tarbert Island	63	Iraghticonnor	Kilnaughtin	Glin												
Tarmon East	937	Iraghticonnor	Kilnaughtin	Glin												
Tarmon Hill	174	Iraghticonnor	Kilnaughtin	Glin												
Tarmon West	314	Iraghticonnor	Kilnaughtin	Glin												
Tawlaght	373	Trughanacmy	Ballynahaglish	Tralee												
Tawlaght	94	Trughanacmy	Ardfert	Tralee												
Tearaght Island	47	Corkaguiny	Dunquin	Dingle												
Teer	1,106	Corkaguiny	Cloghane	Dingle												
Teeraha	314	Iveragh	Killinane	Cahersiveen												
Teeravane	378	Corkaguiny	Dunurlin	Dingle												
Teerbrin	154	Corkaguiny	Stradbally	Dingle												
Teernaboul	635	Magunihy	Killarney	Killarney												
Teernahila	513	Iveragh	Killinane	Cahersiveen												
Teeromoyle	2,246	Iveragh	Killinane	Cahersiveen												
Termons	713	Iveragh	Dromod	Cahersiveen												
The-wood	72	Corkaguiny	Dingle	Dingle												
Tiduff	1,060	Clanmaurice	Ballyheige	Tralee												
Tieraclea Lower	298	Iraghticonnor	Kilnaughtin	Glin												
Tieraclea Upper	163	Iraghticonnor	Kilnaughtin	Glin												
Tiershanaghan	702	Clanmaurice	Ballyheige	Tralee												
Tinahally	386	Trughanacmy	Killorglin	Killarney												
Tinnies Lower East	211	Iveragh	Valencia	Cahersiveen												
Tinnies Lower West	173	Iveragh	Valencia	Cahersiveen												
Tinnies Upper	221	Iveragh	Valencia	Cahersiveen												
Toanreagh	320	Clanmaurice	Ballyheige	Tralee												
Tober	54	Trughanacmy	Kilgarrylander	Tralee												
Toberatooreen	851	Iraghticonnor	Murher	Listowel												
Tobermaing	259	Trughanacmy	Castleisland	Tralee												
Tobernamoodane	343	Corkaguiny	Kinard	Dingle												
Togherbane	329	Clanmaurice	Kilmoyly	Tralee												
Tomies East	136	Dunkerron North	Aghadoe	Killarney												
Tomies West	252	Dunkerron North	Aghadoe	Killarney												
Tomies Wood	267	Dunkerron North	Aghadoe	Killarney												
Tonakilly	47	Corkaguiny	Kilgobban	Tralee												
Tonaknock	222	Clanmaurice	Killahan	Tralee												
Tonavane	1,270	Trughanacmy	Annagh	Tralee												
Tonbwee	127	Trughanacmy	Castleisland	Tralee												
Tonreagh	163	Trughanacmy	Kiltallagh	Tralee												
Tonreagh Lower	157	Trughanacmy	Ballymacelligott	Tralee												
Tonreagh Upper	137	Trughanacmy	Ballymacelligott	Tralee												
Toohana	276	Iraghticonnor	Ballyconry	Listowel												
Toon	253	Iveragh	Killinane	Cahersiveen												
Toor	599	Clanmaurice	Duagh	Listowel												
Toor	213	Dunkerron South	Kilcrohane	Cahersiveen												
Tooracladane	1,481	Iveragh	Dromod	Cahersiveen												
Tooreen	525	Clanmaurice	Kilflyn	Tralee												
Tooreen	435	Clanmaurice	Duagh	Listowel												
Tooreen	170	Trughanacmy	Ballymacelligott	Tralee												
Tooreen	137	Iveragh	Killemlagh	Cahersiveen												
Tooreenagowan	796	Trughanacmy	Ballincuslane	Tralee												
Tooreenard	540	Trughanacmy	Castleisland	Tralee												
Tooreenbreanla	272	Glanarought	Kenmare	Kenmare												
Tooreencahill	622	Magunihy	Nohavaldaly	Killarney												
Tooreenealagh	1,676	Iveragh	Glanbehy	Cahersiveen												
Tooreengarriv	713	Trughanacmy	Ballincuslane	Tralee												
Tooreenmore	1,186	Trughanacmy	Castleisland	Tralee												
Tooreenmore	371	Iveragh	Caher	Cahersiveen												
Tooreennablauha	450	Trughanacmy	Brosna	Tralee												
Tooreennafersha	445	Dunkerron South	Templenoe	Kenmare												
Tooreennahone	365	Dunkerron South	Templenoe	Kenmare												
Tooreennamult	743	Magunihy	Kilcummin	Killarney												
Tooreennascarty	755	Trughanacmy	Ballincuslane	Tralee												
Tooreennasliggaun	468	Iveragh	Killorglin	Killarney												
Tooreennastooka	136	Trughanacmy	Ballymacelligott	Tralee												
Tooreens	1,801	Dunkerron South	Kilcrohane	Cahersiveen												
Tooreenyduneen	559	Dunkerron South	Kilcrohane	Cahersiveen												
Toormoore	522	Magunihy	Kilcummin	Killarney												
Toornageehy	572	Clanmaurice	Kilshenane	Listowel												
Toornanaunagh	807	Magunihy	Kilcummin	Killarney												
Toornaneaskagh	418	Iveragh	Glanbehy	Cahersiveen												
Toornanoulagh	202	Trughanacmy	Killeentierna	Killarney												
Toosaleen	943	Iveragh	Dromod	Cahersiveen												
Tore	362	Magunihy	Killarney	Killarney												
Tragalee	104	Glanarought	Tuosist	Kenmare												
**Tralee**	Town	Trughanacmy	Ratass	Tralee												
**Tralee**	Town	Trughanacmy	Tralee	Tralee												
Tralee	374	Trughanacmy	Tralee	Tralee												
Tralia	260	Magunihy	Kilnanare	Killarney												
Treangarriv	570	Iveragh	Glanbehy	Killarney												
Treanmanagh	600	Iveragh	Glanbehy	Killarney												
Treanoughtragh	74	Iveragh	Killorglin	Killarney												
Trien	276	Iraghticonnor	Knockanure	Listowel												
Trienearagh	1,708	Clanmaurice	Duagh	Listowel												
Trippeenagh	148	Magunihy	Aglish	Killarney												
Trippul East	266	Iraghticonnor	Kilconly	Listowel												
Trippul West	213	Iraghticonnor	Kilconly	Listowel												
Tubbrid	151	Dunkerron South	Templenoe	Kenmare												
Tubbrid	105	Dunkerron North	Knockane	Killarney												
Tubrid Beg	613	Clanmaurice	Ardfert	Tralee												
Tubrid More	993	Clanmaurice	Ardfert	Tralee												
Tulla Beg	205	Iraghticonnor	Kilconly	Listowel												
Tulla More	663	Iraghticonnor	Kilconly	Listowel												
Tullacrimeen	184	Clanmaurice	Kiltomy	Listowel												
Tullaghna	434	Clanmaurice	Rattoo	Listowel												
Tullagubbeen	796	Trughanacmy	Castleisland	Tralee												
Tullaha	835	Magunihy	Killaha	Killarney												
Tullaha	188	Glanarought	Kilcaskan	Kenmare												
Tullahennel North	1,220	Iraghticonnor	Aghavallen	Listowel												
Tullahennel South	971	Iraghticonnor	Aghavallen	Listowel												
Tullakeel	264	Dunkerron South	Kilcrohane	Kenmare												
Tullamore	1,902	Iraghticonnor	Galey	Listowel												
Tullaree	151	Corkaguiny	Killiney	Dingle												
Tullig	974	Iveragh	Dromod	Cahersiveen												
Tullig	787	Glanarought	Kilcaskan	Kenmare												
Tullig	710	Clanmaurice	Kilfeighny	Listowel												
Tullig	659	Trughanacmy	Castleisland	Tralee												
Tullig	391	Glanarought	Kenmare	Kenmare												
Tullig	347	Dunkerron North	Knockane	Killarney												
Tullig	321	Corkaguiny	Killiney	Dingle												
Tullig	319	Magunihy	Killarney	Killarney												
Tullig	295	Iveragh	Killinane	Cahersiveen												
Tullig	211	Corkaguiny	Ballinvoher	Dingle												
Tullig Beg	1,314	Trughanacmy	Killorglin	Killarney												
Tullig More	535	Trughanacmy	Killorglin	Killarney												
Tulligealane	1,246	Iveragh	Dromod	Cahersiveen												
Tullorum	97	Magunihy	Killarney	Killarney												
Tullygarran	163	Trughanacmy	Ballymacelligott	Tralee												
Turnamucka	278	Iveragh	Caher	Cahersiveen												
Tursallagh	580	Trughanacmy	Ballymacelligott	Tralee												
Two Headed Island	222	Dunkerron South	Kilcrohane	Cahersiveen												
Tylagh	412	Trughanacmy	O'Brennan	Tralee												
Ullagha	123	Corkaguiny	Kilmalkedar	Dingle												
Ullauns	1,587	Magunihy	Killarney	Killarney												
Uragh	1,086	Glanarought	Tuosist	Kenmare												
Urlee	520	Iraghticonnor	Lisselton	Listowel												
Urrohogal	502	Trughanacmy	Currans	Killarney												
**Ventry**	Town	Corkaguiny	Kildrum	Dingle												
**Ventry**	Town	Corkaguiny	Ventry	Dingle												
Ventry	192	Corkaguiny	Ventry	Dingle												
Vicarstown	58	Corkaguiny	Dunquin	Dingle												
Waterville	161	Iveragh	Dromod	Cahersiveen												
Whitefield	295	Dunkerron North	Knockane	Killarney												
Woodlawn	67	Magunihy	Killarney	Killarney												
