= Dooneen =

Dooneen An Dúinín
- Townland
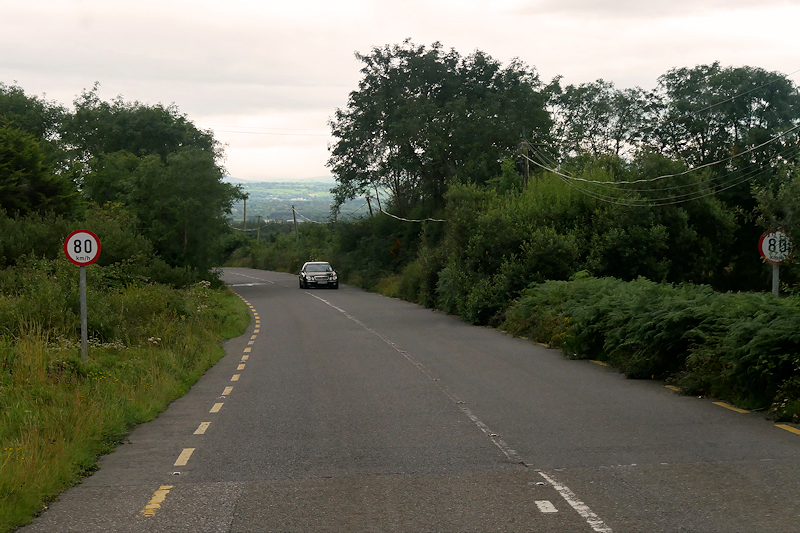
- Local road (L2041) at Dooneen

- Dooneen shown within Ireland
- Coordinates: 52.25°N 9.46°W
- Country: Ireland
- County: County Kerry
- Barony: Trughanacmy
- Civil parish: Castleisland

Dooneen (Irish: An Dúinín) is a townland to the north of Castleisland, County Kerry on the N21 road to Limerick. Dooneen townland, which is approximately 3.3 square kilometres (1.3 sq mi) in area, is in the civil parish of Castleisland and the historical barony of Trughanacmy. Dooneen Wood is in the area.

Dooneen is also the name of Dooneen Point, also in County Kerry, and several townlands in other counties.
