= List of towns and villages in County Limerick =

List of towns and villages in a county of Ireland

This is a list of towns and villages in County Limerick, Ireland.

== A ==
- Abbeyfeale - (Mainistir na Féile)
- Abington - (Mainistir Uaithne)
- Adare - (Áth Dara)
- Ahane - (Atháin)
- Anglesboro - (Gleann na gCreabhar)
- Annacotty - (Áth na Coite/Áth an Choite)
- Ardagh - (Árdach/Árdachadh)
- Ardpatrick - (Árd Pádraig)
- Ashford - (Áth na bhFuinseog)
- Askeaton - (Eas Géitine/Eas Géibhtine/Eas Géiphtine)
- Athea - (Áth an tSléibhe)
- Athlacca - (An tÁth Leacach)

== B ==
- Ballingarry - (Baile an Gharraí/Baile an Gharrdha)
- Ballyagran - (Béal Átha Grean)
- Ballyhahill - (Baile Dhá Thuile/Baile Uí Sháithil)
- Ballylanders - (Baile an Londraigh)
- Ballyneety - (Baile an Fhaoitigh)
- Ballyorgan - (Baile Uí Argáin)
- Ballysteen - (Baile Stiabhna)
- Banogue - (An Bhánóg)
- Barna - (An Bhearna)
- Barringtonsbridge - (Droichead Barrington)
- Bohermore - (An Bóthar Mhór)
- Broadford - (Béal an Átha)
- Bruff - (An Brú/Brúgh na nDéise)
- Bruree - (Brú Rí/Brú Rígh/Brúgh Ríogh)
- Bulgaden - (Bulgaidín/Bulgidín)

== C ==
- Caherconlish - (Cathair Chinn Lis)
- Cantogher/Kantoher - (Ceann Tóchair)
- Cappamore - (An Cheapach Mhór)
- Carrigkerry/Carrickerry - (Carraig Chiarraí)
- Castleconnell - (Caisleán Uí gConaing/Caisleán Uí Chonaill)
- Castlemahon/Mahoonagh - (Caisleán Maí Tamhnach/Maigh Tamhnach/Mathghamhnach)
- Castletown - (also known as 'Castletown Conyers'; Baile an Chaisleáin)
- Clarina - (Clár Aidhne/Clár Einigh)
- Cloncagh - (Cluain Cath/Cluain Catha)
- Crecora - (Craobh Chumhra/Craobh Chomhartha)
- Croagh - (Cróch/An Cruach)
- Croom - (Cromadh)

== D ==
- Doon - (An Dún/Dún Bleisce)
- Dromcollogher - (Drom Collachair)
- Dromkeen - (Drom Chaoin)
- Drombanna - (Drom Bainne)

== E ==
- Effin - (Eifinn/Eimhin)
- Elton - (Eiltiún)

== F ==
- Fedamore - (Feadamair)
- Feenagh - (Fíonach/Fíodhnach)
- Feohanagh - (Feothanach)
- Foynes - (Faing)

== G ==
- Galbally - (Gallbhaile)
- Garryspillane - (Garraí Uí Spealáin/Garrdha Uí Spiolláin)
- Glenbrohane - (Gleann Bhruacháin)
- Glenroe - (An Gleann Rua/An Gleann Ruadh)
- Glin - (An Gleann/Gleann Chorbraí)
- Granagh - (Greanach)
- Grange - (An Ghráinseach/An Ghráinsigh)

== H ==
- Herbertstown - (Baile Hiobaird/Baile Iorbairt/Cathair Fuiseog)
- Hospital - (An tOspidéal/Ospidéal Gleann Áine)

== K ==
- Kilbehenny - (Coill Bheithne/Coill Mheithne)
- Kilcolman - (Cill Chólmáin)
- Kildimo - (Cill Díoma)
- Kilfinnane - (Cill Fhíonáin)
- Kilfinny - (Cill na Fíonaí)
- Kilmallock - (Cill Mocheallóg/Cill Moicheallóg)
- Kilmeedy - (Cill m'Íde/Cill Míde)
- Kilteely - (Cill Tíle/Cill tSíle)
- Knockaderry - (Cnoc an Doire)
- Knockainey - (Cnoc Áine)
- Knocklong - (Cnoc Loinge)

== L ==
- Limerick - (Luimneach)
- Lisnagry - (Lios na Graí)

== M ==
- Martinstown - (Baile Mháirtín)
- Meanus - (Méanas)
- Montpelier - (Montpelier)
- Mountcollins - (Cnoc Uí Choileáin)
- Mungret - (Mungairit/Mungraid)
- Murroe - (Máigh Rua/Mágh Ruadh/Má Rua)

== N ==
- Newbridge - (An Droichead Nua)
- Newcastle West - (An Caisleán Nua Thiar)

== O ==
- Oola - (Úlla/Úbhla)

== P ==
- Pallasgreen - (Pailís Gréine/Pailís na Gréine/Pailís Ghréine)
- Pallaskenry - (Pailís Chaonraí)
- Patrickswell - (Tobar Phádraig)

== R ==
- Raheenagh - (Ráithíneach)
- Rathkeale - (Ráth Caola/Ráth Gaola)

== S ==
- Shanagolden - (Seanaghualainn)
- Strand - (An Trá)

== T ==
- Templeglantine - (Teampall an Ghleanntáin)
- Tournafulla - (Tuar na Fola)
