= N21 road (Ireland) =

Road in Ireland

N21 road
- Bóthar N21

Route information
- Length: 84.37 km (52.43 mi)

Location
- Country: Ireland
- Primary destinations: (bypassed routes in italics): County Limerick; Patrickswell; Adare; Rathkeale; Newcastlewest; Abbeyfeale; County Kerry; Castleisland; Tralee - terminates at Camp on N22/N69 Tralee Bypass

Highway system
- Roads in Ireland; Motorways; Primary; Secondary; Regional

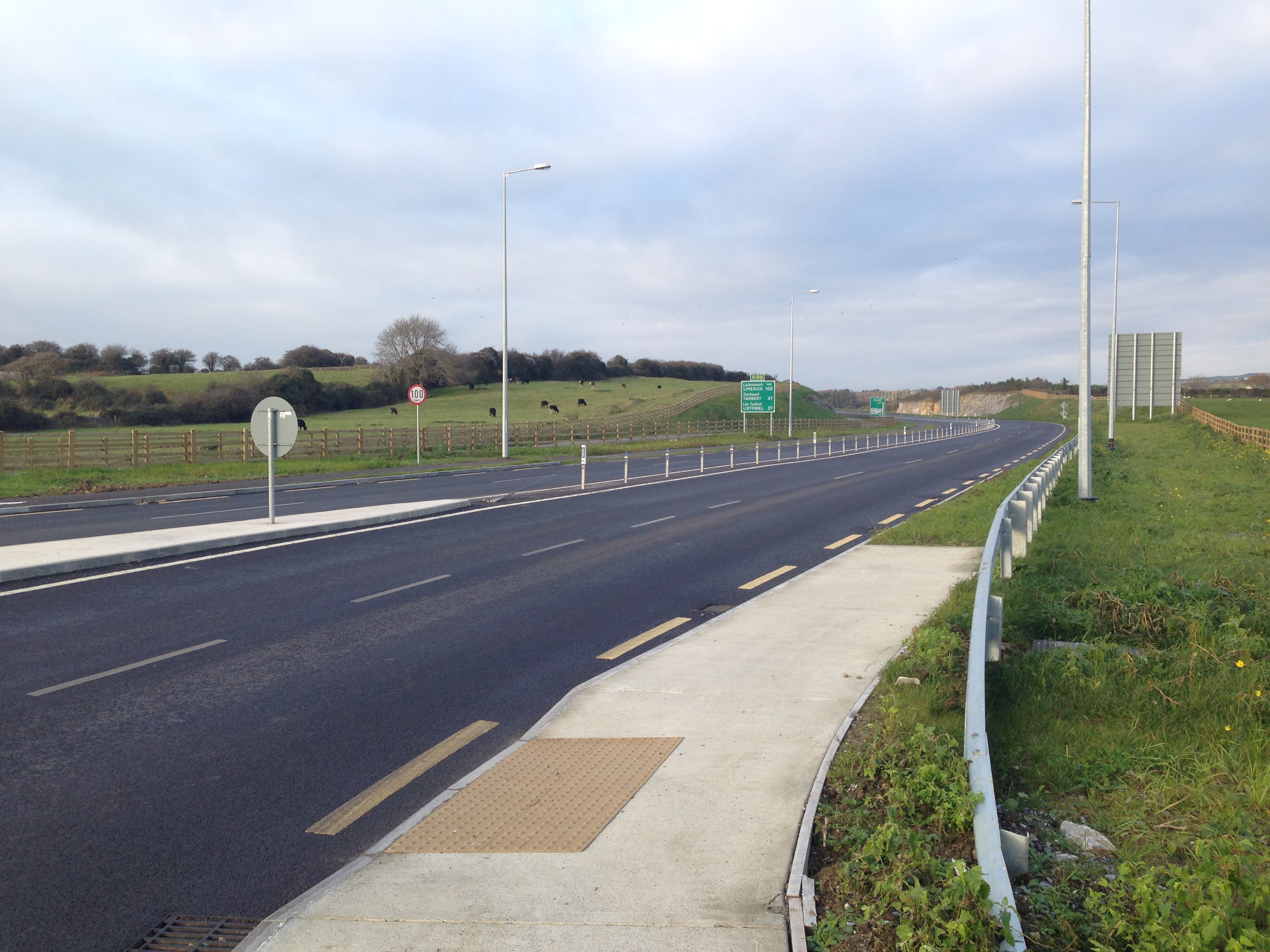
N21/N69 Tralee Bypass

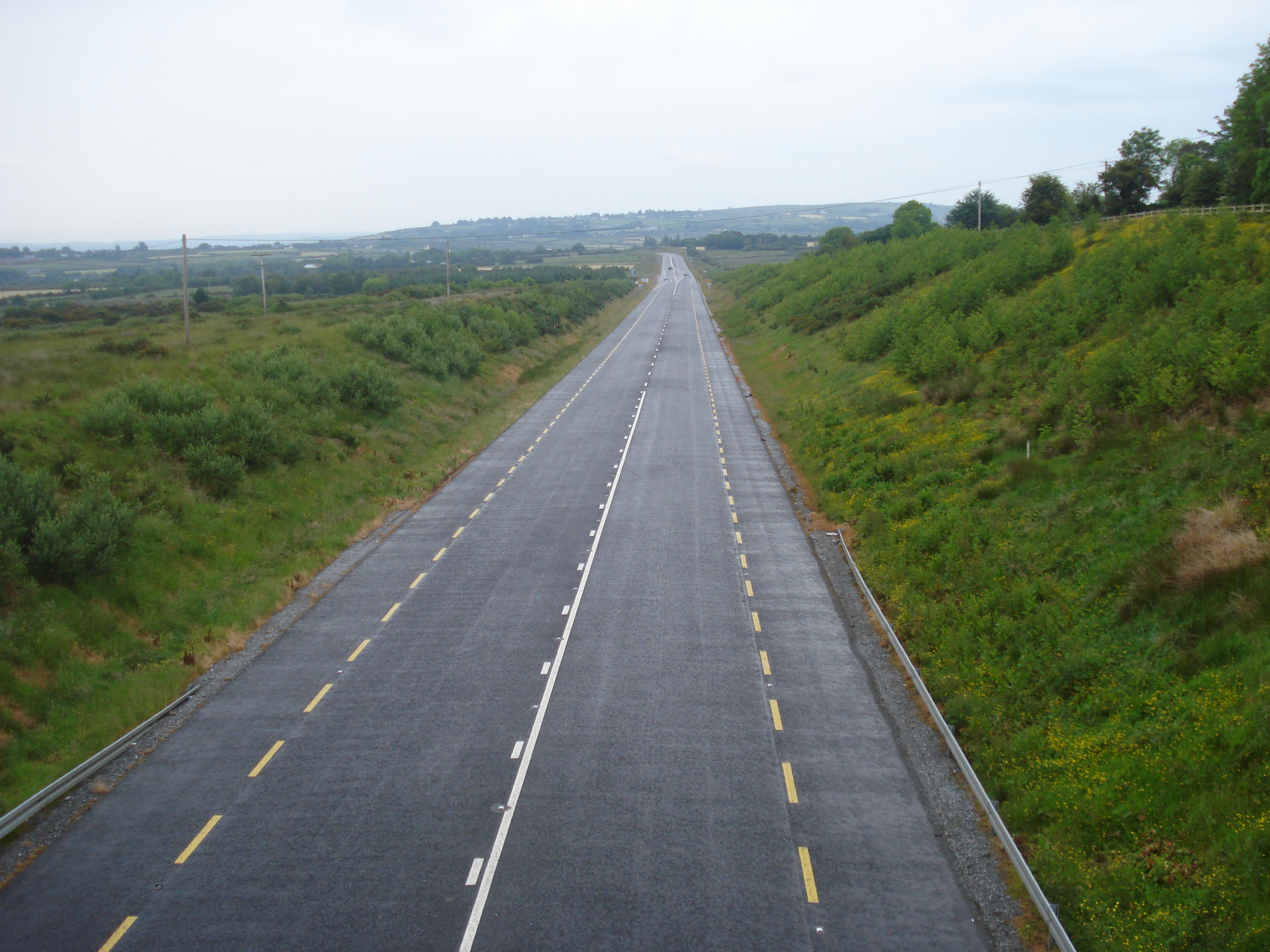
The Castleisland-Abbeyfeale N21 scheme opened 2006 looking north from the Kilmaniheen Overbridge

The N21 road is a national primary road in Ireland. The route runs from the M20 outside Limerick to Tralee with connecting roads to other parts of County Kerry. It is 84.37 km (52.43 mi) in length. It runs through the towns of Abbeyfeale, Newcastle West, Adare and the village of Templeglantine. Prior to October 2010 the N21 also ran through the town of Castleisland. The town has since been bypassed. Rathkeale was also bypassed in 1992.

== Route ==
The N21 route commences about 8 km (5.0 mi) southwest of Limerick city, just beyond Patrickswell. At the junction, which is reached by the main M20 motorway, the N20 diverges south to Cork and the main dual-carriageway becomes the N21 west.

Prior to the 2001 opening the new dual-carriageway, traffic to Kerry left the city on the old N20 in a southwest direction on the Ballinacurra Road through Raheen and then went through Patrickswell to the beginning of the N21.

The new 11 km (6.8 mi) M20/N21 dual-carriageway route begins at junction 1 on the Rosbrien Interchange as the M20 where it leaves the M7/N18 Limerick Southern Ring Road, and bypasses the Limerick suburbs of Dooradoyle, Raheen and Patrickswell, and continues, as the N21, almost to Adare. At this point the N21 becomes a standard two-lane road and flows through the main street of the scenic village.

The N21 then runs by Croagh and Rathkeale, which were bypassed in 1986 and 1992 respectively, before entering the main county town of Newcastle West and filtering through the town. Further along the route the N21 passes through Templeglantine, before going through the town of Abbeyfeale.

The road continues southwest, at the townland of Kilkinlea it crosses over the River Feale into County Kerry passing by Knocknagoshel and heading towards Castleisland. A new 7 km (4.3 mi) roadway from Abbeyfeale to Knocknagoshel, bypassing the accident-prone Headleys bridge near Knocknagoshel opened in July 2006. The remainder of the road to Castleisland was realigned in the 1980s. A 6 km (3.7 mi) section north of Casleisland was overlaid and brought up to standard in 1999.

At Castleisland, the N21 heads west to Tralee. The short N23 continues southwest to Farranfore, allowing traffic to continue south along the N22 to Killarney. A new 11 km (6.8 mi) road from Castleisland to Ballycarty near Tralee was opened in early 2001. This was followed by a new 3 km (1.9 mi) section into Tralee, opened in April 2005. The N21 terminates at Camp Roundabout on the N22/N69 Tralee Bypass which opened in August 2013.

== Upgrades ==
The Castleisland Bypass was a national road project which commenced in 2009 and for which construction work completed in October 2010. The new road was officially opened on Friday, 22 October 2010, by then Minister for Defence Tony Killeen. The route consists of 5.3 km of type 2 dual carriageway and connects the N21 to the N23 bypassing Castleisland to the west of the town.

A section of the N21 west of Newcastle West was one of the more dangerous stretches of road in the country, known locally as Barnagh, between Newcastlewest and Templeglantine. At one point there were 4 deaths on the stretch within 4 weeks, with 5 total deaths there in 2010. A local group, known as the "N21 Barnagh Road Realignment Petition", campaigned to realign this section. The stretch of road was upgraded between 2011 and 2013.

=== Adare bypass ===
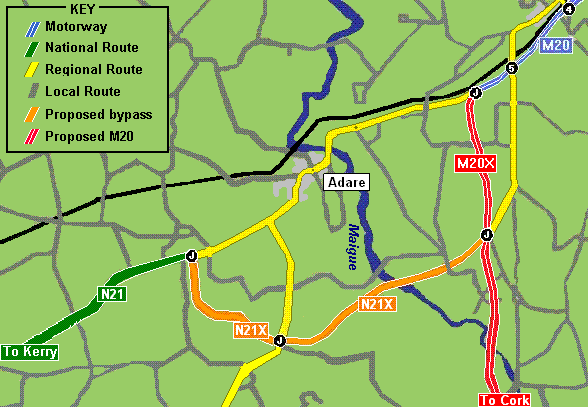
A previously planned route of the Adare bypass

The Adare bypass, which will carry the N21 around the village of Adare, County Limerick, is under construction, ahead of Adare Manor's hosting of the 2027 Ryder Cup. Originally proposed as part of the Foynes to Limerick Road Improvement Scheme, a 33 km (21 mi) bypass of Newcastle West and Abbeyfeale was at the planning stage in 2006. Proposals were rejected by An Bord Pleanala in 2012, and by the National Roads Authority in 2013. Updated bypass plans were subject to additional inquiries by An Bord Pleanala in early 2021.

== Traffic congestion ==
The N21 is also known as a notorious traffic bottleneck particularly in the County Limerick towns of Abbeyfeale, Newcastlewest and Adare. The towns (most notably Adare) feature regularly on morning and evening traffic reports where delays of up to 30 minutes can occur. Local traffic, commuters and tourist traffic all contribute to the congestion.

== See also ==
- Roads in Ireland
- Motorways in Ireland
- National secondary road
- Regional road
