= N23 road (Ireland) =

Road in Ireland

N23 road
- Bóthar N23

Route information
- Length: 9.509 km (5.909 mi)

Location
- Country: Ireland
- Primary destinations: County Kerry; Farranfore, leaves N22; Kerry Airport; Crosses The Brown Flesk River; Castleisland Terminates at junction with the N21

Highway system
- Roads in Ireland; Motorways; Primary; Secondary; Regional

The N23 road is a national primary road in Ireland, and is located entirely in County Kerry. The route is one of the shorter national primary routes, merely forming a link road between the N21 Limerick – Tralee route at Castleisland to the N22 Tralee – Killarney – Cork route at Farranfore. This facilitates traffic passing in the Limerick – Killarney direction or vice versa, allowing it to avoid detouring into Tralee.

== See also ==
- Roads in Ireland
- Motorways in Ireland
- National secondary road
- Regional road
