= Dom Punch =

Irish hurler

Dominic Punch
Personal information
- Nickname: Dom
- Born: 15 June 1958 (age 68) Patrickswell, County Limerick
- Occupation: Accountant
- Height: 5 ft 10 in (178 cm)

Sport
- Sport: Hurling
- Position: Left corner-back
Club
- Years: Club
- 1970s-1990s: Patrickswell
Inter-county
- Years: County
- 1970s-1980s: Limerick
Inter-county titles
- Munster titles: 2
- All-Irelands: 0
- NHL: 0
- All Stars: 0

Dom Punch (born 15 June 1958 in Patrickswell, County Limerick) is a retired Irish sportsperson. He played hurling with his local club Patrickswell and was a member of the Limerick senior inter-county team in the 1970s and 1980s.
