= R526 road (Ireland) =

Road in Ireland

R526 road
- Bóthar R526
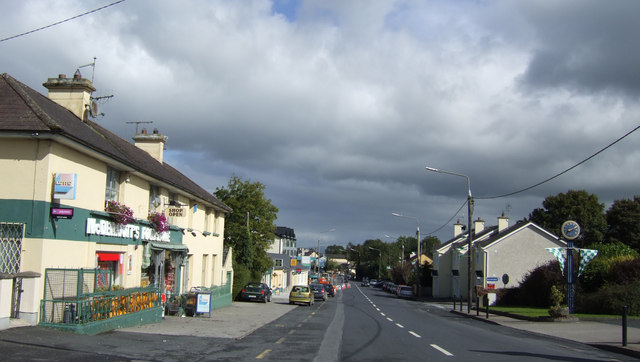
- Main Street, Patrickswell, on the R526

Route information
- Length: 12 km (7.5 mi)

Major junctions
- From: M20 at Patrickswell
- Dooradoyle
- To: R445 at Abbey River Bridge in Limerick city centre

Location
- Country: Ireland
- Counties: County Limerick

Highway system
- Roads in Ireland; Motorways; Primary; Secondary; Regional

The R526 is a regional road in County Limerick, Ireland which follows the former route of the N20 that is now classified as the M20 Motorway, from Junction 5 of the M20 to a junction with the R445 in Limerick city centre.
