= N20 road (Ireland) =

Road linking Cork and Limerick in Ireland

N20 road
- Bóthar N20

Route information
- Length: 96.45 km (59.93 mi)

Location
- Country: Ireland
- Primary destinations: (bypassed destinations in italics): Limerick City; City Centre (via R526); Dooradoyle; Raheen; County Limerick; Patrickswell; Croom; Rockhill; County Cork; Charleville; Buttevant; Newtwopothouse; Mallow; Ballynamona; Cork City; Blarney; Killeens Cross; Blackpool; City Centre

Highway system
- Roads in Ireland; Motorways; Primary; Secondary; Regional

The N20 road is a national primary road in Ireland, connecting the cities of Cork and Limerick. Buttevant, Croom, Charleville, Mallow and Blarney are major towns along the route. A short section of the route (from Limerick to Patrickswell) is motorway standard and is designated as the M20 motorway.

== Route ==
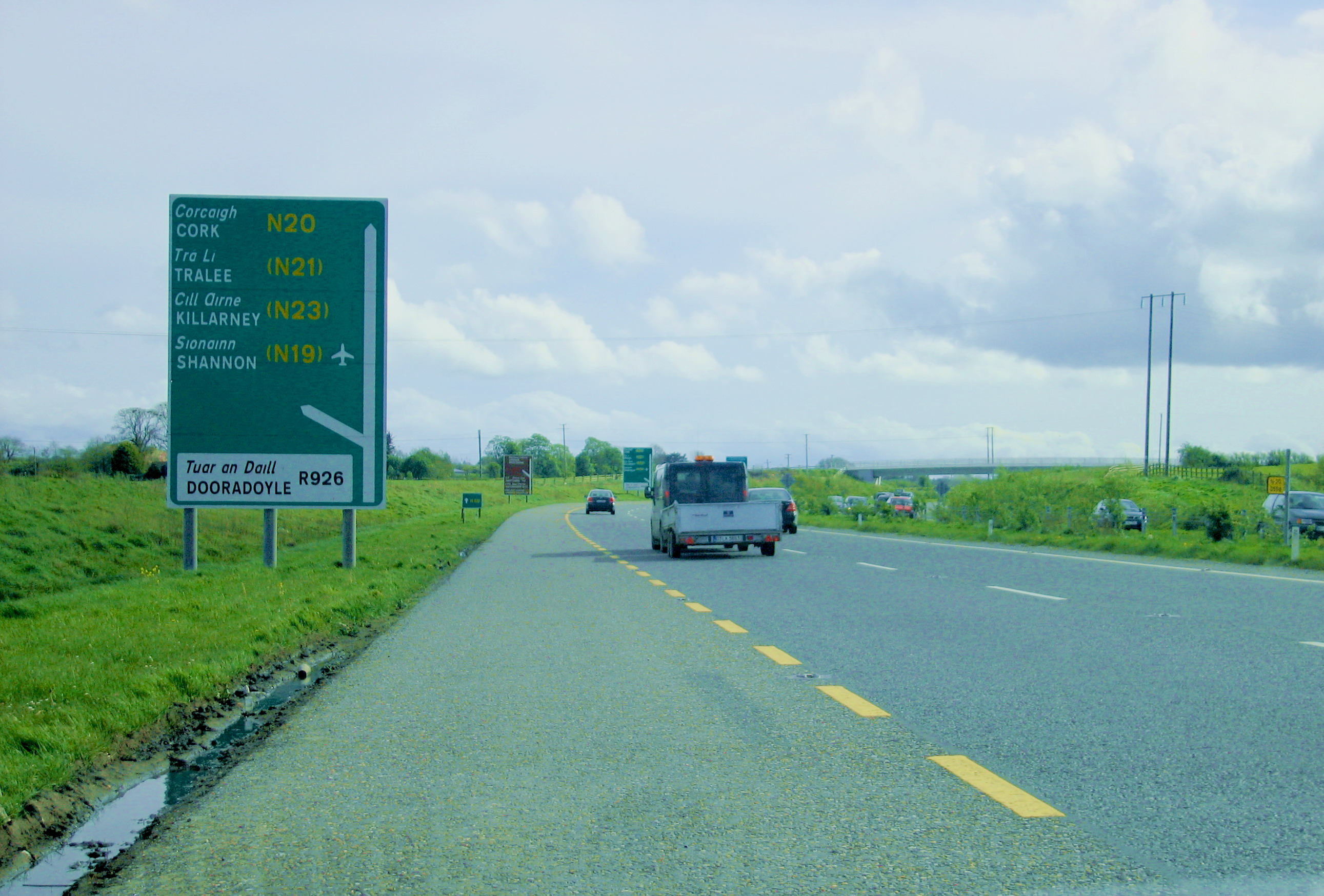
N20 on the dual carriageway bypass into Limerick, approaching the exit for Dooradoyle. As of 2009, this section has been designated motorway.

=== M20 Rosbrien Interchange (Limerick) to Patrickswell ===
The route starts at junction 1 at the Rosbrien interchange (south of Limerick city) where it connects to the M7 and the N18 which together form the Limerick Southern Ring Road. The route continues from this interchange as motorway. This route was redesignated as motorway in August 2009. The route bypasses Dooradoyle and Raheen, through which the old N20 route used to run until the early 2000s. Interchanges and link roads connect to these locations. Two further interchanges are located on the motorway, at either end of Patrickswell. At the latter, the N20 route leaves the main road (which continues as the N21 to Tralee), so one must diverge from the motorway to stay on the N20. The former route of the N20 before the M20 opened is now classified as the R526.

=== N20 Patrickswell to Cork City ===
A wide two lane road brings traffic along the Croom bypass (prior to the opening of this bypass at a cost of €20 million on 12 July 2001, the route went through the town). Past this new section of road, narrow two-lane road commences, ending at Charleville. The route passes through the town, running along Main Street. The road between Charleville and Buttevant is of similar design. At Mallow a relatively high specification road is encountered, with an older bypass of the town (early 1990s) passing up the hill from it as dual carriageway. A viaduct brings the road across the Blackwater River and Valley. The rest of the route to Cork is two lanes wide, with a section of 2+1 road (a pilot installation) south of Mallow. The route becomes dual carriageway on the approach to Cork. Junctions on this dual carriageway section are not numbered. New relief roads in Cork bring the route into the city centre while avoiding the winding streets through which the route ran until around 2000. The route terminates at the city center with two lanes going in each direction.

== M20 motorway ==
M20 motorway
- Mótarbhealach M20

Route information
- Length: 8 km (5.0 mi) Planned length: 90 km (56 mi)
- Existed: 2001–present
- History: Expected Opening Date 2035

Major junctions
- From: Rossbrien
- J1 → M7 motorway, N18 road J5 → N21 road
- To: Attyflin

Location
- Country: Ireland
- Primary destinations: Cork City, County Cork, Limerick

Highway system
- Roads in Ireland; Motorways; Primary; Secondary; Regional

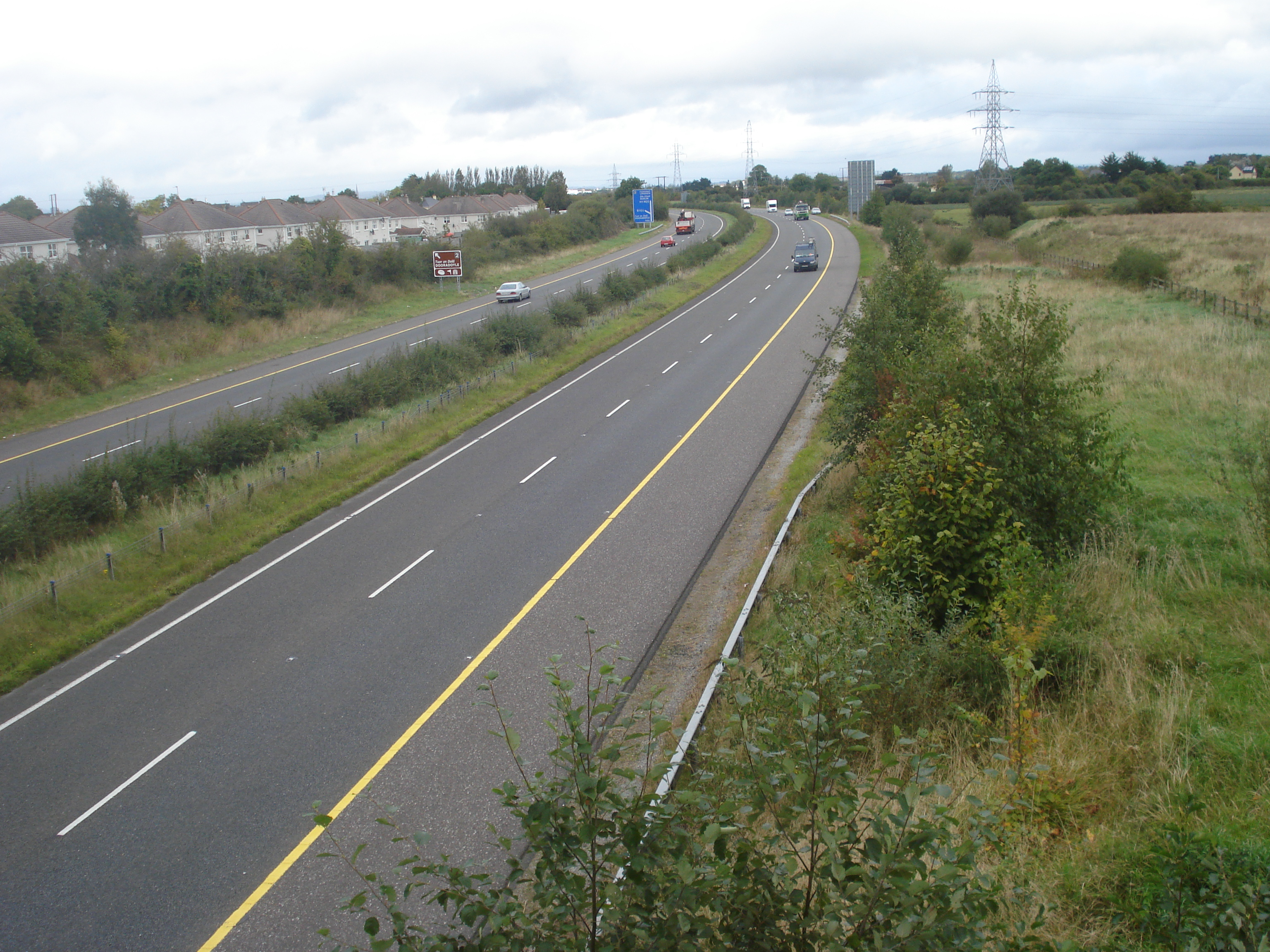
The M20 outside Limerick city approaching junction 2 northbound

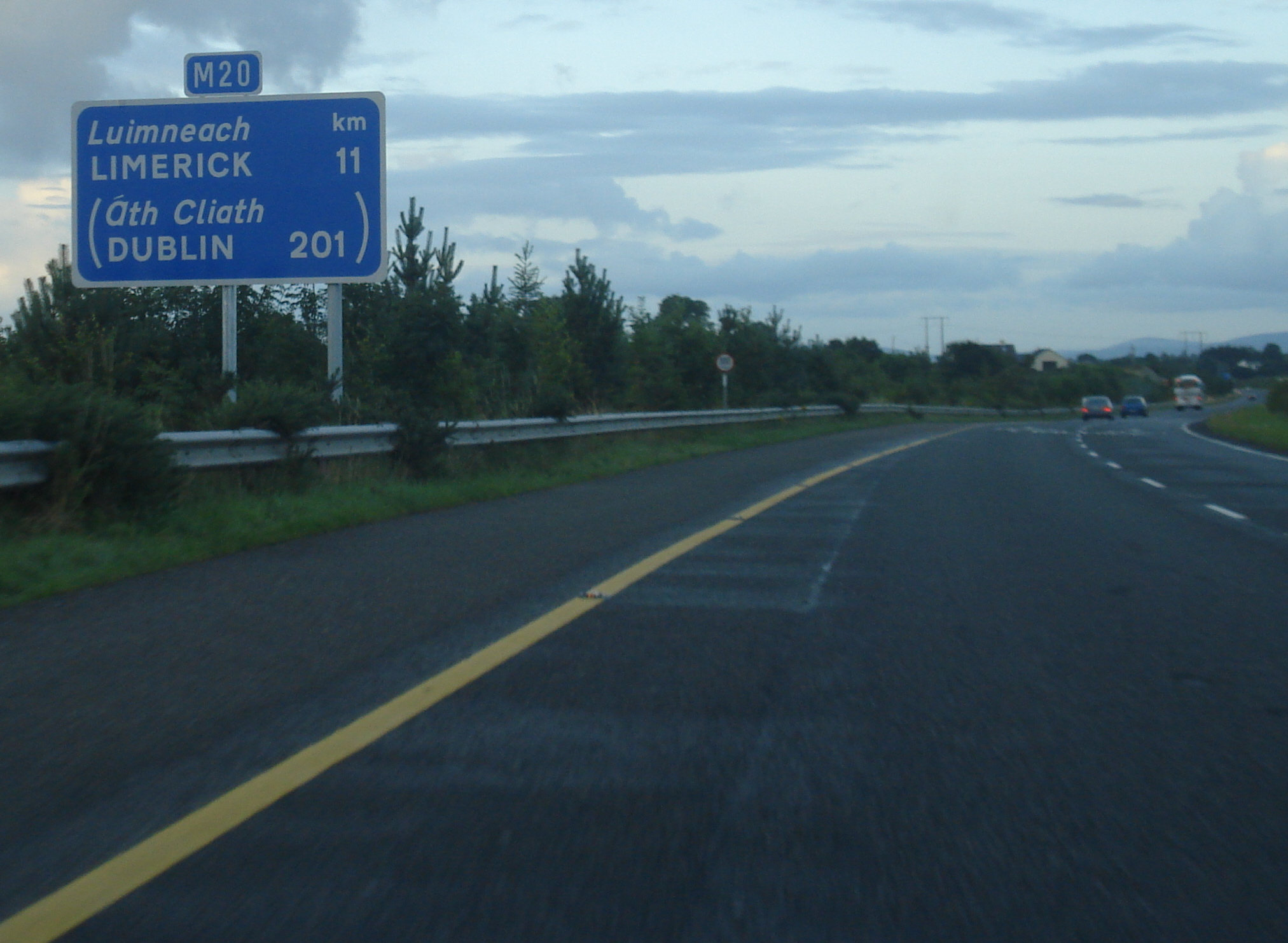
A route confirmatory sign on the M20 showing distances to destinations

Under the government's cancelled Transport 21 initiative, the Atlantic Corridor road project aimed to link Letterkenny to Waterford via Limerick and Cork with high quality roadway. A major part of this proposal involved the potential upgrading of the N20 route between Cork and Limerick. It was proposed to upgrade or replace the entire N20 with a new M20 motorway, approximately 90 km (56 mi) in length. It was to be constructed in two stages: a southern section and a northern section. It was suggested that the project could be progressed as a public-private partnership scheme.

The first segment of M20 motorway came into existence on 28 August 2009 following the redesignation of a 10 km (6 mi) stretch of existing N20 dual-carriageway, between Rossbrien and Attyflin, as a motorway.

In October 2017, then Taoiseach Leo Varadkar stated that the motorway project would be a "priority". By late 2021, it was reported that there would not be a decision on a preferred route until at least early 2022. The preferred M20 route was published in March 2022, with the projected €1.5 billion project dated to "2030 or beyond". In June 2024, the National Road Design team recommended that the revised 80km of the N20 be developed as a tolled motorway. At that time, the project was estimated at €2 billion, and it was suggested that construction "could start in 2027 and be finished by 2031".

== Junctions ==
County	km	mi	Junction	Destinations	Notes
County Limerick
County Limerick	95.5	59.3	1	M7 ‒ Dublin, Limerick (East) (N69); N18 – Galway, Limerick (Centre) (N24)	
County Limerick	94	58.4	2	R926 ‒ Dooradoyle	
County Limerick	91.5	56.8	3	R510 – Raheen, Foynes (N69)	Raheen Business Park
County Limerick	88	54.6	4	R526 – Patrickswell	
County Limerick	85.5	53.1	5	N21 – Tralee, Killarney, Adare	Continues as N20 single carriageway towards Cork.
1.000 mi = 1.609 km; 1.000 km = 0.621 mi: Route transition

== See also ==
- Roads in Ireland
- National secondary road
- Regional road
