= Crescent Shopping Centre =

Shopping centre in Limerick, Ireland

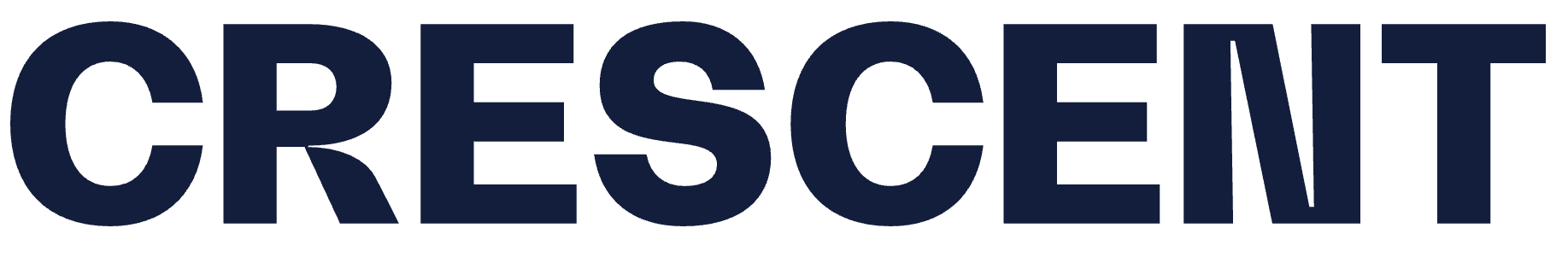
- Location: Dooradoyle, Limerick, Ireland
- Coordinates: 52.64°N 8.65°W
- Opened: 1973
- Manager: John Davitt
- Num. of stores: 94
- Num. of anchor tenants: 6
- Floor area: 37,000 m^{2} (400,000 sq ft)
- Floors: 2
- Parking: 2,500
- Website: Crescent Shopping Centre

The Crescent Shopping Centre is a major shopping centre serving Limerick, Ireland. It is located in Dooradoyle, on the southern outskirts of the city. The complex in its original form was opened in 1973, making it one of the earlier shopping centres to open in Ireland. It has an estimated 100,000 m^{2} (1,100,000 sq ft) of space, 2,500 free car parking places and 94 shops (including stalls). The shopping centre takes its name from the adjacent Crescent College, whose original building was in The Crescent in the city centre.

== History ==
The main original part of the centre was built with a cross-type layout, with four malls (City Mall, Dooradoyle Mall, Garryowen Mall and Shannon Mall) running from a central atrium. It opened in 1973, one of the early contemporary shopping centres in the country (the earliest 'modern' shopping centre in Ireland was opened in 1966 at Stillorgan in Dublin, followed by Northside Shopping Centre in Coolock).

The main anchor stores have been Quinnsworth (now Tesco) and Shaws (a department store) located near the central area, and Penneys, located on one of the malls. The other units in the centre have varied over the years, although some shops and eateries have maintained a long presence.

The centre remained largely unchanged but for some redecoration in the late 1980s, early 1990s, and the addition at one stage of shop units in the central atrium. A major plan was drawn up in the late 1990s to expand the centre. A first step was the moving of the Limerick County Council library to a purpose built building separate from the main centre. A new section of mall was added to the Garryowen mall, creating a modern shopping space similar to those in the new large Dublin shopping centres. An underground car park was built below this to compensate for the above-ground parking taken up by the new development. Other developments in association with this included the opening of a new 12-screen cinema, the Omniplex. Limerick County Council also acquired land next to the development for their new headquarters (previously their headquarters was in the city on O'Connell Street). The final stage of the work was the redevelopment of the old part of the shopping centre. New modern lighting, flooring and decor was added to the centre, and shop fronts were redesigned to conform to a standard fashion. The result was the reverse-engineering of a 1970s shopping complex into a centre similar to modern developments elsewhere in Ireland.

The shopping centre for now remains the largest shopping centre in Limerick after further expansion of the Dooradoyle mall in 2005.

A playground was planned on the grounds of the centre in 2013. Building of the playground began in May 2014, and it officially opened in July 2014.

In 2024, a major reorganisation of the anchor tenants were planned, Tesco and Penneys committed to upsizing their stores, Tesco previously had 2 stores in the centre (one for grocery and one for homewares and clothing) but the latter was added to an expanded former store in 2025. Penneys plans to upsize into the former Tesco homewares and clothing store.

== Criticism ==
The Crescent Shopping Centre is at times the subject of criticism due to the out-of-town nature of the development. The development mirrors the American model of large retail centres on the outskirts of towns with ample parking and easy access for customers. While the centre has been one of the most successful in Ireland, its success has come at a cost to the older established retailing areas within Limerick city centre, which have seen decline due to dropping footfall and subsequent lack of spend and investment, resulting in high levels of vacancy, with centres like the Crescent partly supplanting the city centre as key shopping districts. The well-documented potential negative knock-on effects to high levels of out-of-town development include increased sprawl of the city and car dependency, a reduction in tourism and appeal of the city as a potential destination area (tourism & living) and a decline in the socioeconomic profile of the city centre impacting negatively on the overall city economy. Although the Crescent centre is not the only cause for the city centre's decline it is often cited as one of the main reasons for Limerick's 'doughnut effect'.
