= Mungret =

Village in County Limerick, Ireland

Mungret Mungairit
- Village
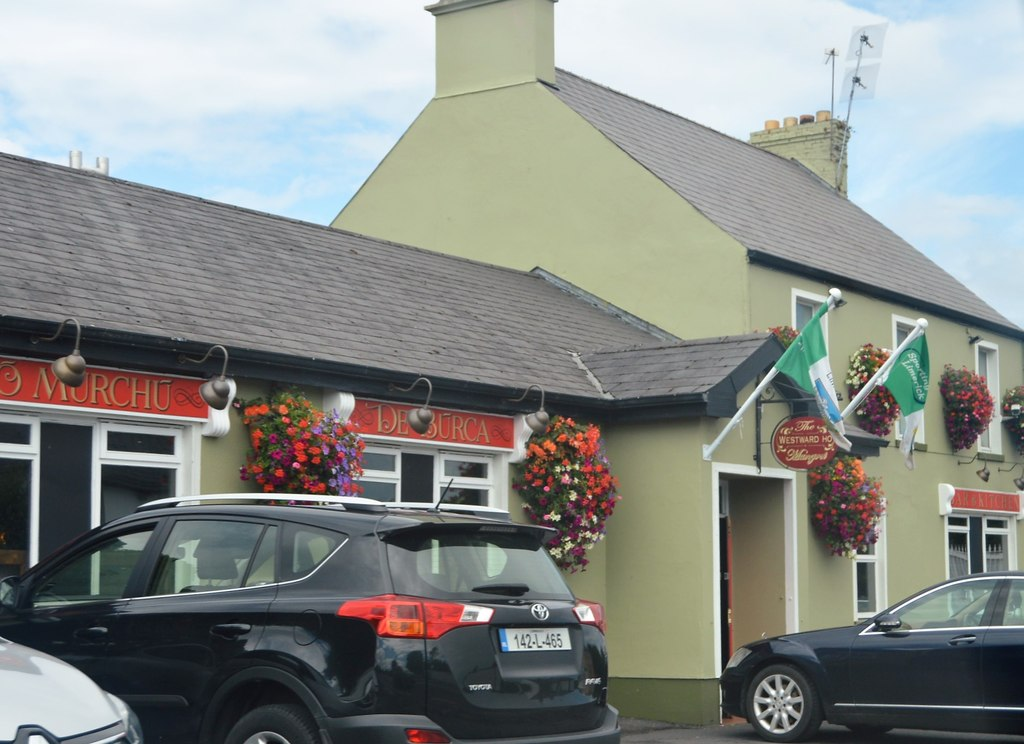
- Pub and restaurant in Mungret

- Location in Ireland
- Coordinates: 52.6356°N 8.6928°W
- Country: Ireland
- Province: Munster
- County: County Limerick

Population (2016)
  - Total: 277
- Irish grid reference: R530540

Mungret (Irish: Mungairit) is a village and civil parish in County Limerick, Ireland. It is 6 km south-west of Limerick city centre, on the N69 road. As of the 2016 census, the village had a population of 277 people.

The local church, which is dedicated to Saint Oliver Plunkett, was built in 1981; and is in the parish of Mungret, Crecora and Raheen within the Roman Catholic Diocese of Limerick. The local Gaelic Athletic Association club is Mungret St. Paul's.

== Places of interest ==
Mungret Abbey, approximately 1 kilometre (0.62 mi) east of the village, is a medieval friary and designated National Monument within the parish.

Close to the abbey is Mungret College, a (former) Jesuit secondary school.

== See also ==
- List of towns and villages in County Limerick
