= N22 road (Ireland) =

National primary road in Ireland

N22 road
- Bóthar N22

Route information
- Length: 116.33 km (72.28 mi)

Major junctions
- From: N21 Limerick, N69 Listowel, R875 Tralee
- N70 Killorglin, Dingle (N86); N23 Farranfore, Castleisland, Kerry Airport; N70 Killorglin; R876 Killarney; N72 Mallow, Rathmore; R618 Ballyvourney; R582 Macroom; R608 Ballincollig; N40 Cork South Ring Road; Kanturk, Blarney
- To: Cork City Centre

Location
- Country: Ireland
- Primary destinations: (bypassed routes in italics): Cork City; City Centre; Carrigrohane; Ballincollig; County Cork; Macroom; Ballyvourney; County Kerry; Farranfore; Killarney - (N72, N71); Tralee - terminates at Camp on N22/N69 Tralee Bypass

Highway system
- Roads in Ireland; Motorways; Primary; Secondary; Regional

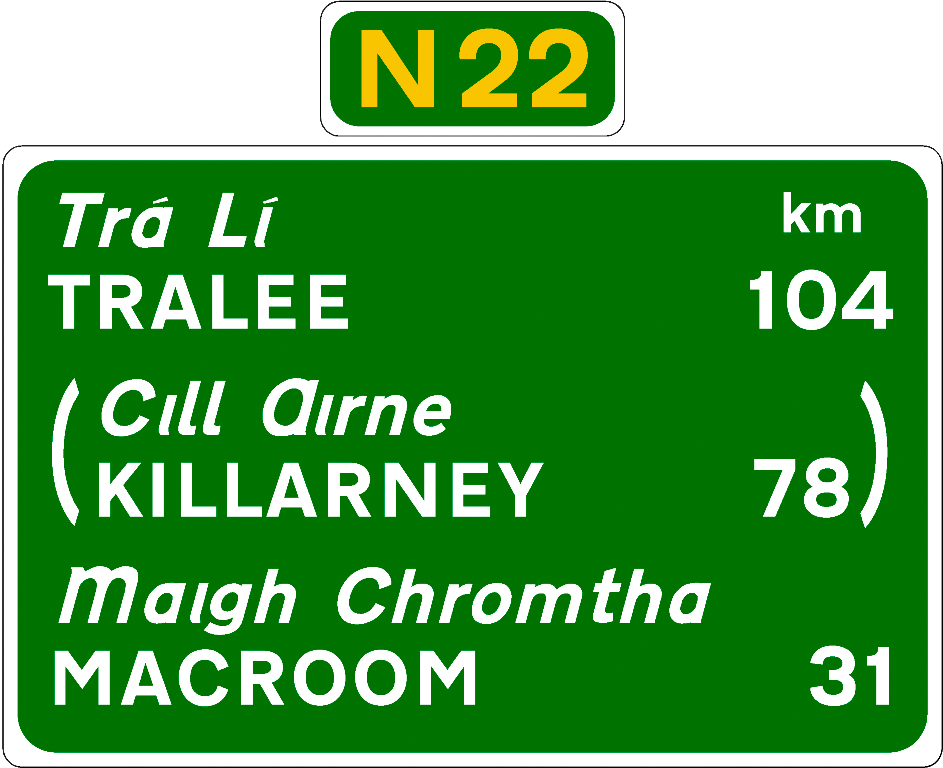
N22 Route Confirmation Sign

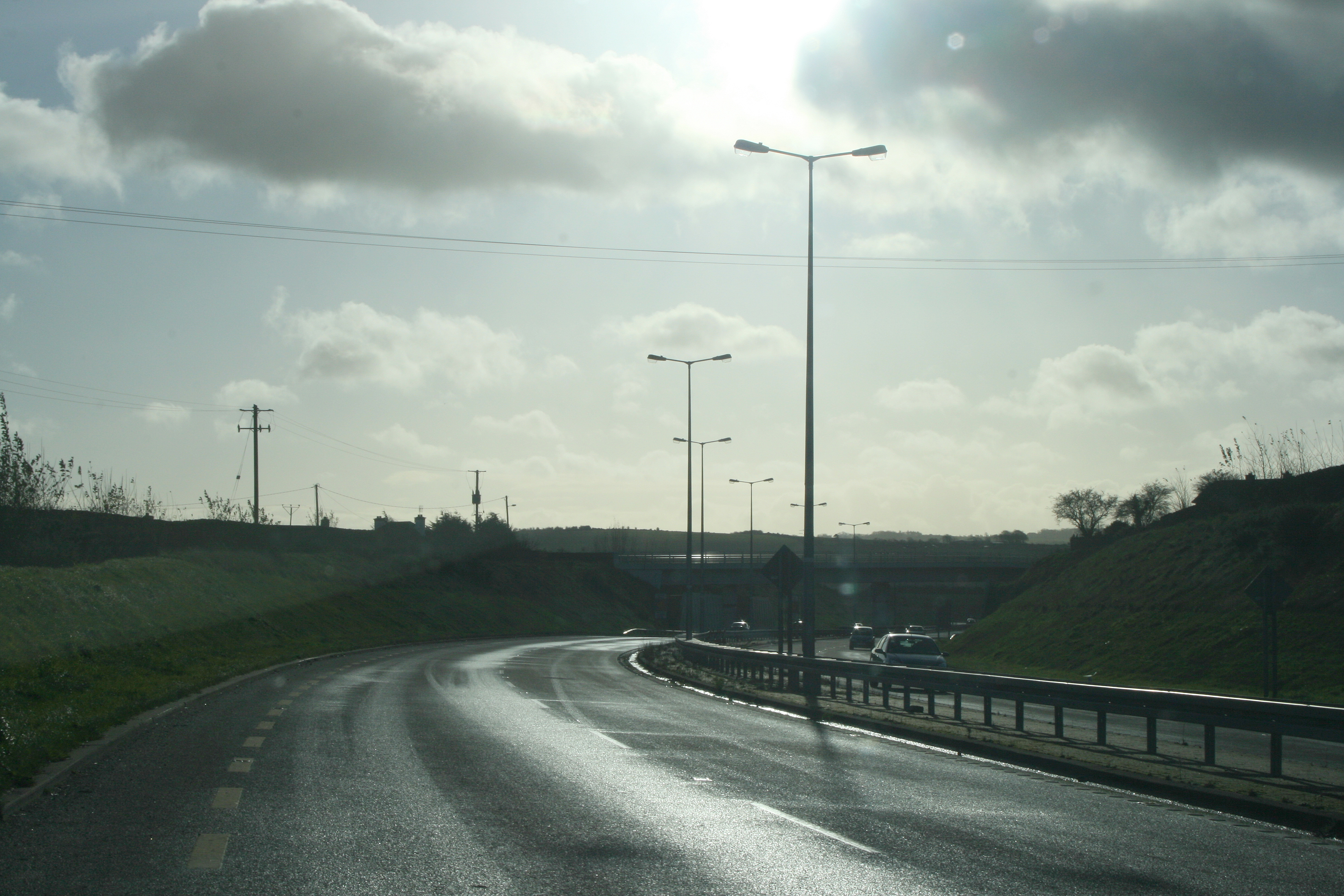
N22 approaching the Cork South Ring Road from the north

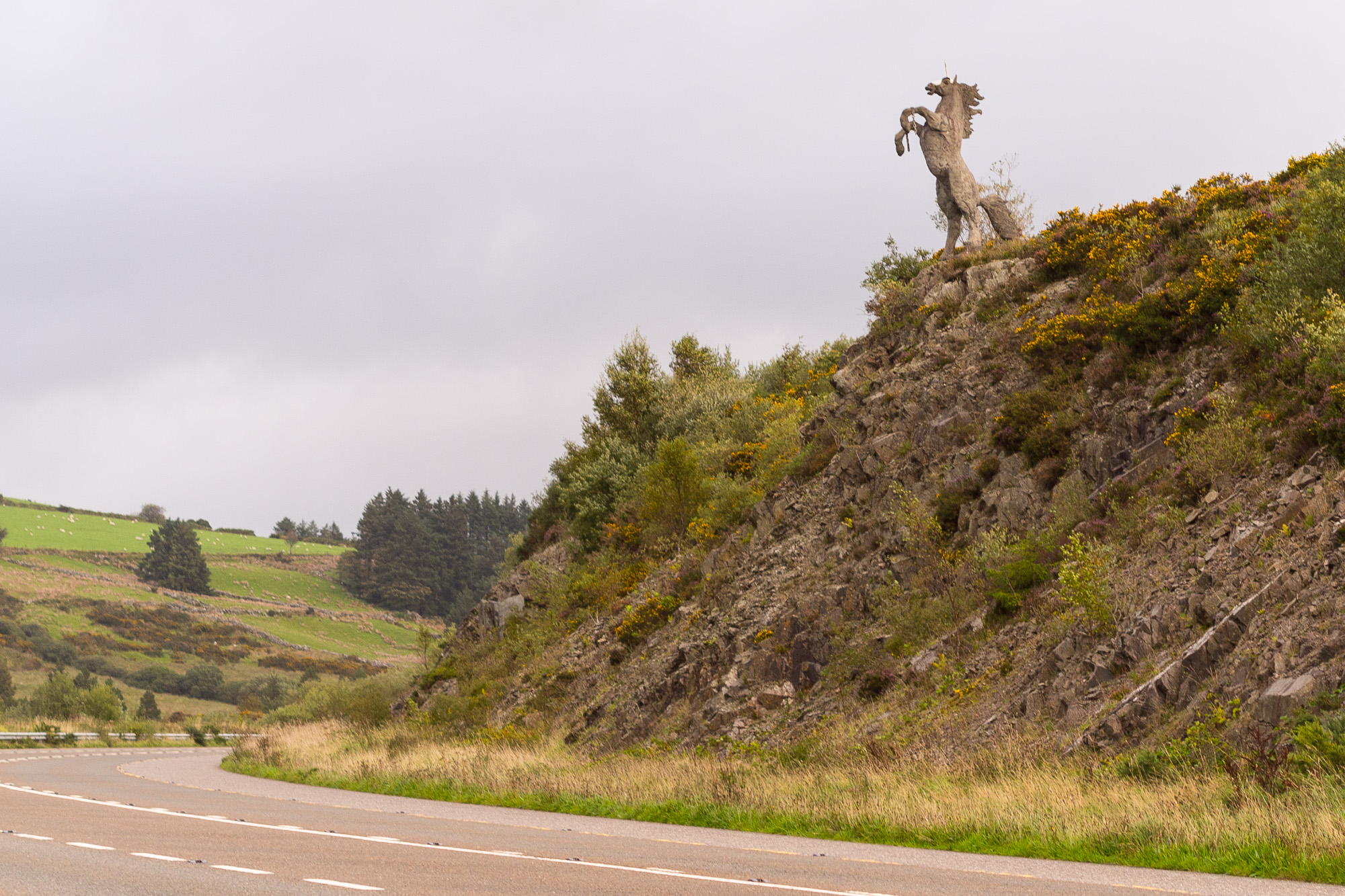
The Unicorn sculpture at road N22

The N22 road is a national primary road in Ireland which goes through counties Kerry and Cork, from Tralee in the west through Killarney, Macroom and Ballincollig to Cork City Centre in the east.

== Improvements ==
Sections of the N22 were upgraded in the late 20th and early 21st century. During the 1980s and 1990s, a 25 km (16 mi) section between Killarney and the border with County Cork was rebuilt and widened. An auxiliary climbing lane has been provided on the steep grade sections. The late 1980s saw a 3 km (1.9 mi) bypass of Killarney. In 2004, the Ballincollig bypass in the west of Cork city was completed. This is an 11 km (6.8 mi) dual carriageway road built to motorway standards that connects with the N40 Cork South Ring Road. In 2005, 4 km (2.5 mi) of the road between Tralee and Farranfore was upgraded. This added to a 4 km (2.5 mi) section opened in 2002. In August 2013, a new 5.5 km (3.4 mi) section of road was added as part of the Tralee N22/N69 bypass project at Ballingrelagh replacing the section of road where the N22 originally ended at the N21 John Cronin Roundabout in Ballycarty. The N22 now terminates at Camp Roundabout outside Tralee on the N22/N69 Tralee Bypass.

In 2020 works began on a new Baile Bhuirne – Macroom bypass to ease congestion through Macroom. The first phase of the project opened in December 2022, with phases 2 and 3 opened in August and in November 2023 respectively.

== Route ==
The N22 between Killarney and Cork via Macroom is the N71 which goes through Kenmare, Glengarriff, Bantry, Skibbereen, Clonakilty and finally Bandon.

== Planned upgrades ==
Four major projects are in planning for the N22:

- Killarney – Farranfore
- Macroom to Ballincollig rebuild
- Cork Northern Ring Road, connecting with M8 junction 18. (Likely to be designated as N40).

Additionally there are proposals for 2+1 road upgrades to the Killarney – Ballyvourney section. The Farranfore – Killarney and Ballyvourney – Macroom schemes are to be developed as 2 plus 1 roads also. The Cork Northern Ring Road is currently in planning, and consists of 17 km (11 mi) of dual carriageway. Part of the Cork Northern Ring Road scheme would be designated motorway.

It is famous for The Sculpture Road to Killarney where the internationally respected sculptor, Tighe O'Donoghue/Ross of Glenflesk and his son, Eoghan, were commissioned to place sculpted stones along the new part of the road between Killarney and the county bounds to Cork. Most of the stones were excavated during the building of the road, varying between one and three tons in weight. The most popular sculpture is that of a rearing horse, set atop a rise along the road near Clonkeen. Made from ferro-cement over a steel infrastructure, An Capall Mór, the race horse, is accoutered with a helmet featuring a unicorn horn, typical of the war horses used by the Celtic chiefs during their battles. There are broken chains around its front legs, signifying freedom.

== Exit list ==
N22 Road
Westbound exit	Junction	Eastbound exit
Ballincollig (East), Kanturk, Blarney (N22)		Ballincollig (East), Kanturk, Blarney (N22)
Ballincollig, Grange Hill		Ballincollig, Grange Hill
Ballincollig (R608)		Ballincollig (R608)

== See also ==
- Roads in Ireland
- Motorways in Ireland
- National secondary road
- Regional road
