= Croagh =

Village in mid County Limerick, Ireland

Croagh Cróch
- Village
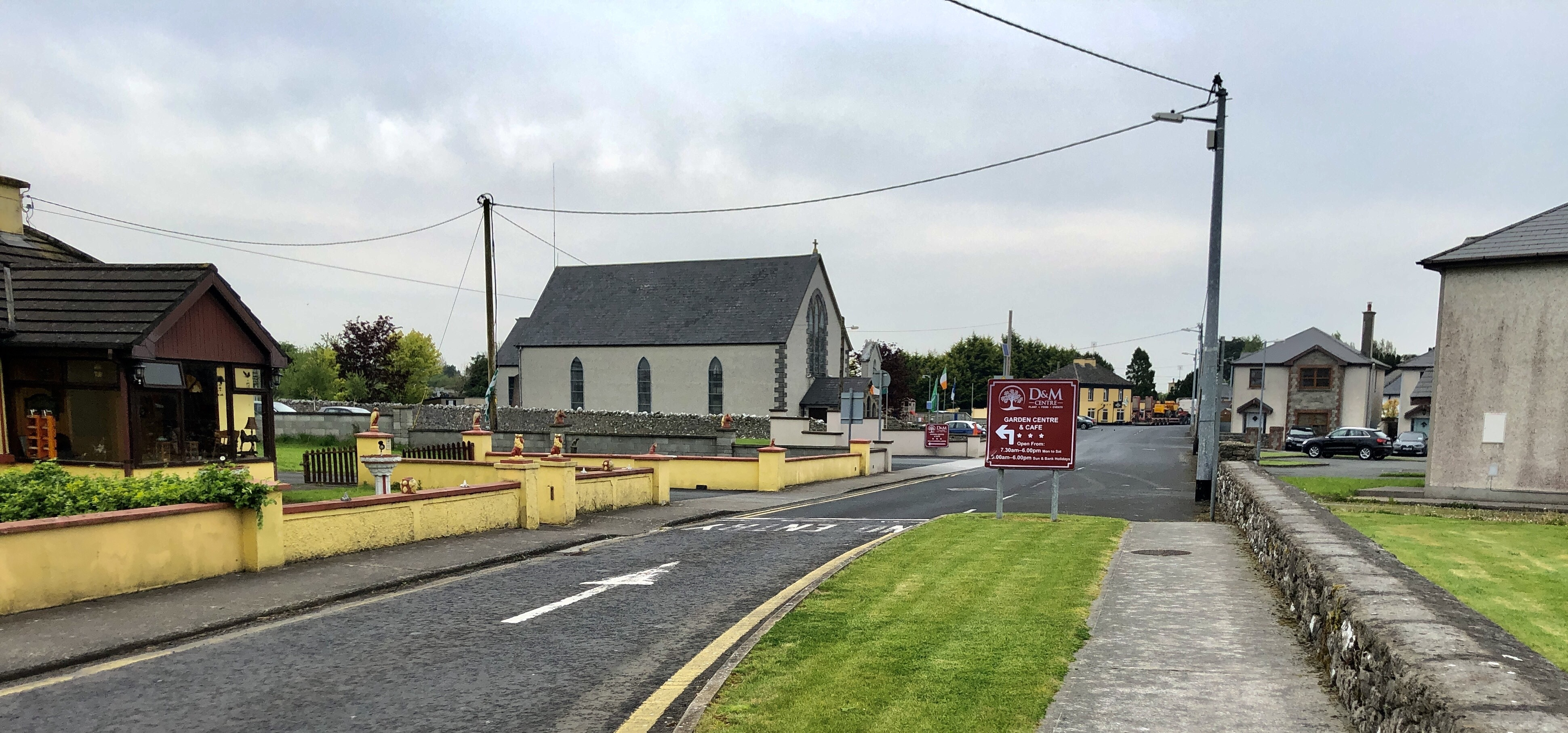
- Main Street in Croagh village

- Location in Ireland
- Coordinates: 52°32′03″N 08°52′14″W
- Country: Ireland
- Province: Munster
- County: County Limerick

Population (2016)
  - Total: 216
- Irish grid reference: R408428

Croagh (Irish: Cróch) is a small village and civil parish in County Limerick, Ireland. It is located in mid-Limerick between Rathkeale and Adare just off the N21 national primary road, approximately 22 kilometres (14 miles) southwest of Limerick City. The village was originally part of this route before construction of the Croagh by-pass in 1986. The village is in the agricultural area known as the Golden Vale.

== Name ==
According to the Placenames Database of Ireland, the meaning and derivation of Croagh (Cróch) is unclear. Over the centuries, Croagh has been known by a number of names, including Moycro (1239), Croch (1416), Croth (1452), Croghe (1586), Croaghstowne (1669) and Cruach (1840).

== History ==
Evidence of ancient settlement in the area includes a number of ringfort and fulacht fiadh sites in the townlands of Croagh, Adamswood and Ballycannon. The ruins of a medieval church and enclosure lie in the village. The current Catholic church, which is dedicated to Saint John the Baptist and was built c. 1830, is one of several protected structures within the village.

In Samuel Lewis's Topographical Dictionary of Ireland (published in 1837), it is suggested that King James II, while retreating from his loss at the Battle of the Boyne in 1690, spent one night at Amigan Castle, a local tower house within Croagh parish. This claim has not been verified and is described in some sources as "legend".

== Amenities and sport ==
Croagh, which had a population of 216 as of the 2016 census, has a national (primary) school with an enrollment of approximately 70 children. Other amenities include a Catholic church, garden centre, childcare facility, medical centre, music school, pubs, nursing home, community centre, a village park and sports ground.

The local Gaelic Athletic Association club, Croagh-Kilfinny, won the 2020 Limerick Junior Hurling Championship (played in 2021 due to Covid restrictions), as well as the Limerick Intermediate Hurling Championship in 2024.

The local association football club, Shountrade AFC, was founded in Croagh in 1987. It competes in the West Limerick based Limerick Desmond League.

== See also ==
- List of towns and villages in County Limerick
