= Raheen, County Limerick =

Suburb of Limerick, Ireland

Raheen An Ráithín
- Suburb
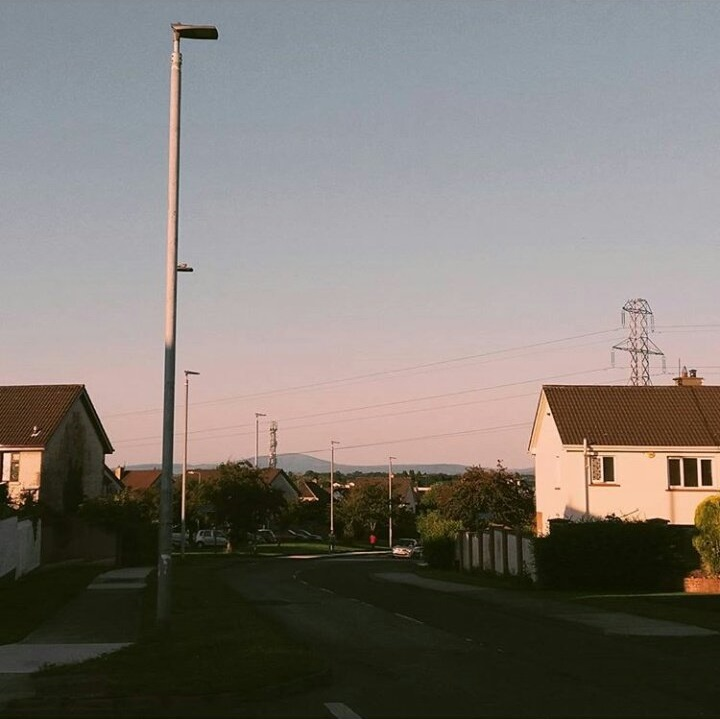
- Mulcair Road in the summer

- Location in Ireland
- Coordinates: 52°37′55″N 8°39′29″W
- Country: Ireland
- Province: Munster
- City: Limerick
- Time zone: UTC+0 (WET)
  - Summer (DST): UTC-1 (IST (WEST))
- Irish Grid Reference: R550534

Raheen (Irish: An Ráithín, meaning 'small ringfort') is a large suburb of Limerick, Ireland. Initially developed to ease population overspill from the city of Limerick, Raheen is socioeconomically diverse, ranging from older, poor-class housing estates to relatively affluent areas.

== History ==
The oldest parts of the area were built in the 1960s and 1970s. In the following years, Raheen and neighbouring Dooradoyle both experienced growth, particularly during the Celtic Tiger. Raheen became one of Limerick's more multicultural areas, as it was a common destination for immigrants. It has for a long time contained notable populations of Jewish, South Asian and Chinese descent, with a large influx of immigrants from Eastern Europe arriving during Ireland's economic boom.

Until 2014, Raheen, as with many other large Limerick city suburbs, was outside the boundary of Limerick City Council. Local government was under the jurisdiction of Limerick County Council, itself a separate authority to the city council with responsibility towards County Limerick. June 2014 saw the merger of the Limerick authorities into one unified authority. The merger saw the expansion of the city boundaries to include Raheen. Limerick City Council made many attempts in the past to extend its control over these parts of the city but were unsuccessful as part of a boundary extension to the city council area.

== Economy ==
The local economy is highly dependent on light and heavy industry based at Raheen Business Park. It is the home of many international companies, and multi-national concerns with premises there including Regeneron Pharmaceuticals, Analog Devices, Dell, Banta, ON Semiconductor, Stryker Corp. (formerly Howmedica), RRD GTS, and Emutex. The Dell manufacturing plant was one of the largest employers in Limerick before its closure in January 2009, which dealt a major blow to the economy of the greater Limerick area. The former Dell plant has since been taken over by Regeneron.

The radio station Spin South West and a Limerick and Clare Education and Training Board (LCETB) campus (formerly FÁS) operate from the Raheen Industrial Estate. The Industrial Estate is divided into two sections, the old section entrance is on the Raheen Roundabout (R526 St Nessan Road and R510) the Second Entrance is on the New Section with its entrance on the M20.

== Amenities ==
Raheen shares many amenities with neighbouring Dooradoyle, including the Crescent Shopping Centre and the main campus of University Hospital Limerick. Shops and restaurants/cafés are located around the Raheen and adjoining Father Russell Road area. St. Nessan's Church (a Roman Catholic church) is located in Raheen.

Schools in the area include St. Paul's National School and St. Nessan's National School. Secondary schools in the area include Crescent Comprehensive College (in Dooradoyle) and Gaelscoil an Raithin.

== Transport ==
Raheen has 3 different city bus routes running through it, operated by Bus Éireann:

- 301 (Westbury/Shannon Banks-Father Russell Road via City Centre)
- 304 (UL-Raheen/Ballycummin via City Centre)
- 304A (Monaleen-Raheen via Bus/Rail Station)

The 301 and 304 run via the city centre between Father Russell Road and Raheen to Westbury/Shannon Banks and UL respectively. The 304A runs between Raheen and Monaleen via Colbert Station on Parnell Street, avoiding the city centre.

The R526 runs through Raheen into Limerick City Centre. National road N69 starts in the area, linking it to Tralee, County Kerry, as well as the N18 linking Limerick to nearby Shannon Airport and further on to Ennis, County Clare and Galway City.

Raheen also hosts exits to the M20 and M7 motorways, linking Limerick city to Cork and Dublin.

== See also ==
- List of towns and villages in Ireland
- The 2023 song by artist whenyoung Gan Ainm references Raheen, comparing it to California. The bands members Aoife & Andrew hail from Limerick.
