= Kerry Airport =

International airport in Southwestern Ireland

Kerry Airport Aerfort Chiarraí
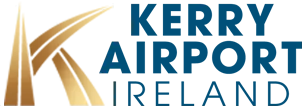

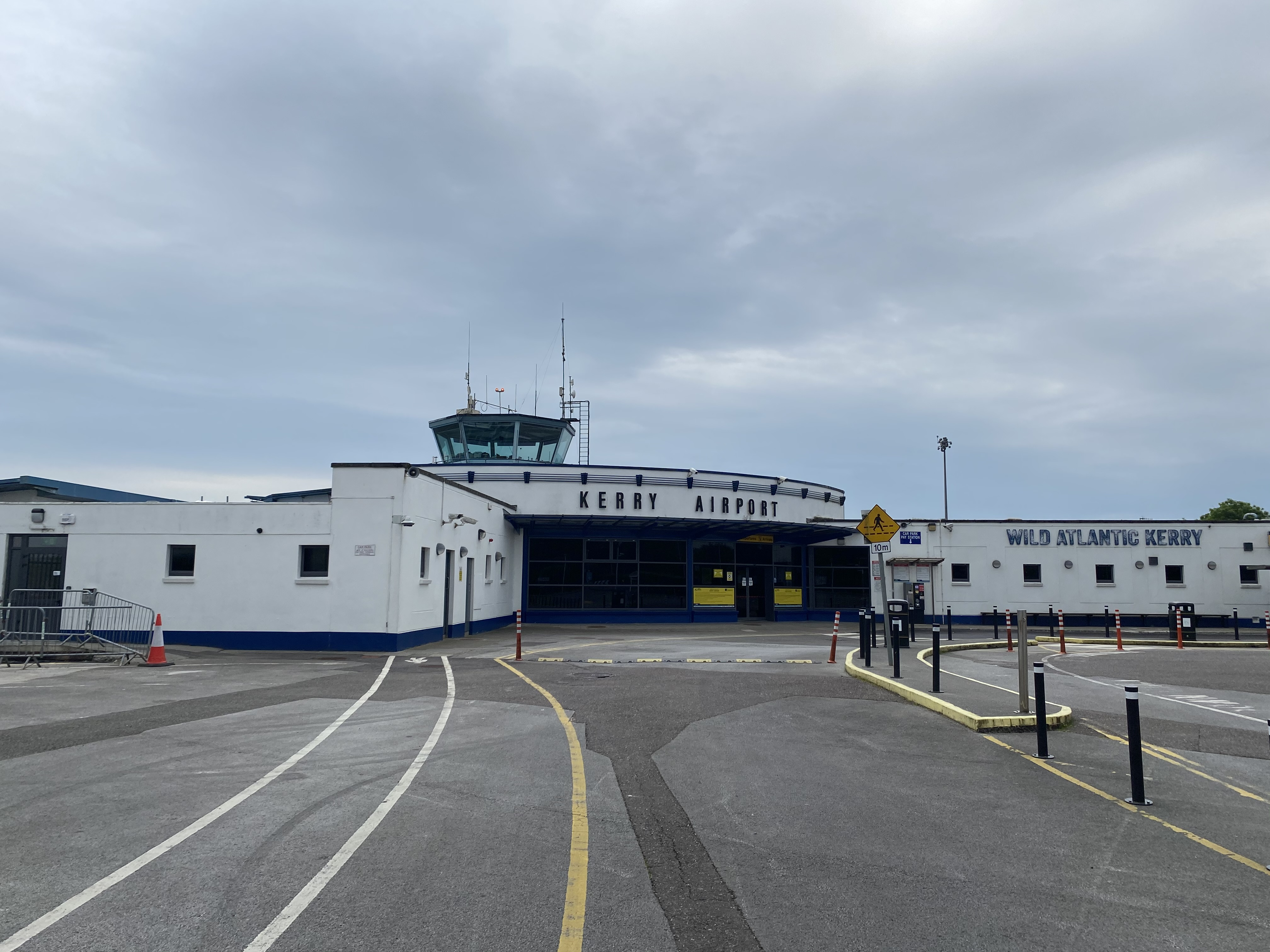
- IATA: KIR; ICAO: EIKY

Summary
- Airport type: Public
- Operator: Kerry Airport plc
- Serves: County Kerry, Ireland
- Location: Farranfore, County Kerry
- Opened: 25 August 1969; 57 years ago
- Elevation AMSL: 112 ft (34 m)
- Coordinates: 52°10′51″N 009°31′26″W
- Website: www.kerryairport.ie

Map
- Location of Kerry Airport in Ireland

Runways
Direction	Length		Surface
Direction	m	ft	Surface
07/25	2,000	6,562	Asphalt

Statistics (2025)
- Passengers: 440,180
- Passenger change 24-25: ▲7%
- Sources: AirNav Ireland, CSO

Kerry Airport (Irish: Aerfort Chiarraí; IATA: KIR, ICAO: EIKY), often called Farranfore Airport, is an international airport in Farranfore, County Kerry, Ireland. It is 7 nautical miles (13 km; 8.1 mi) north off the Ring of Kerry and 8 nautical miles (15 km; 9.2 mi) southeast of the county town, Tralee. Passenger services are operated by Ryanair and more recently French airline Chalair. In 2024, Kerry Airport handled 417,409 passengers.

== History ==
=== Foundation and early years ===
Kerry Airport was incorporated as a public limited company in July 1968, with its main objective of building and managing an airport at Farranfore. Various share capital fundraising programmes were undertaken and, together with great assistance from the various statutory bodies over the years, the airport has developed from a runway of 1,090 metres x 23 metres commissioned in 1969, to a runway of 1,239m x 30m commissioned in 1989, and a new runway of 2,000m x 45m opened in May 1994.

The first aircraft to land at Kerry Airport, on 25 August 1969, was piloted by Captain Milo Carr of the Department of Transport and Power. For a number of years the only aircraft using the aerodrome were light private aircraft and the occasional charter or cargo flight; extensive parachuting also took place. The first scheduled service was inaugurated in July 1979, using an Islander aircraft operated by Aer Arann.

Encouraged by the apparent success of other regional airports in Ireland, the board of directors drew up a development plan to lengthen and widen the runway to 1,200m x 30m and to extend and upgrade the terminal buildings and to install an Instrument Landing System and appropriate lighting.

The runway was completed on schedule; the first scheduled flight into Kerry was on 22 May 1989 from Dublin by Aer Lingus, followed the next day by Ryanair from London-Luton. The contract for the new runway of 2,000m x 45m and the new terminal was signed in May 1993, and the official sod-turning ceremony was performed by Dick Spring TD, the Tánaiste.

The Runway 08/26 was licensed by the Irish Aviation Authority on 20 May 1994, and the first flight landed at 13:23 local time on 20 May. It was a PA28 aircraft registration G-BLSD from Manchester, piloted by C. Gurley. This was followed by the first commercial flight by Aer Lingus, a Saab 340. Its registration was EI-CFD and it was commanded by Captain Peter Heinz.

=== Development since the 2000s ===
The Government of Ireland has previously subsidised regional services under a PSO programme. A tender is offered for airlines to provide a minimum level of service in return for subsidy and a monopoly of the route. The tender is published in the Official Journal of the European Union. Aer Arann were re-awarded the PSO for the 2005 offer programme but in 2008 it was awarded to Ryanair.

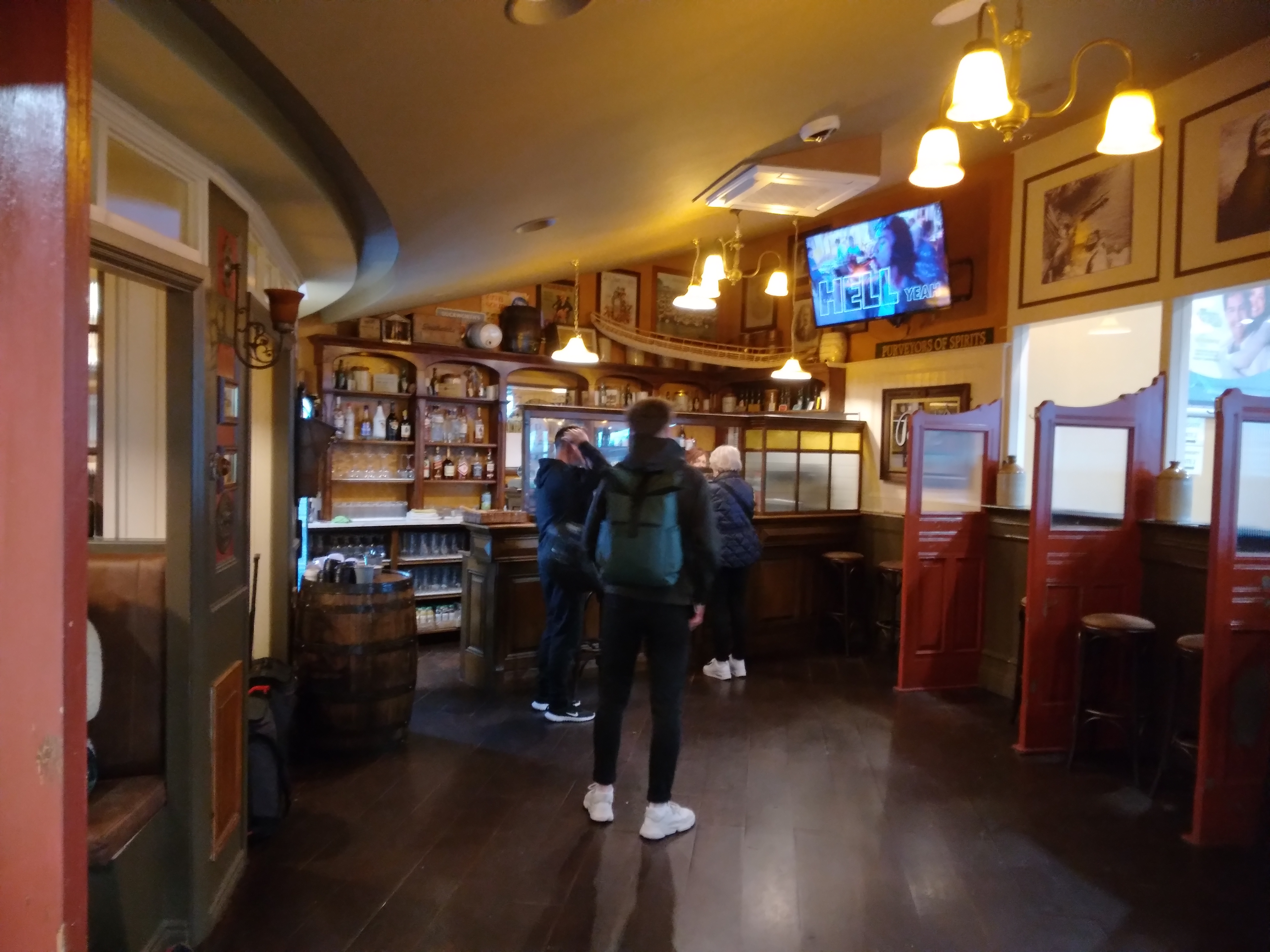
The interior of Kerry Airport bar and restaurant

The airport is a public limited company, but is not quoted on any stock exchange. It had an operating profit of €179,329 in 2009 on a turnover of €6,252,221. This represented a fall of 32% from the previous financial year. The operating profit for the year 2015 was €30,980.

In January 2011, it was announced that 20 of the airport's 65 staff would be made redundant, owing to a fall in passenger numbers following Ryanair's withdrawal from its public service obligation (PSO) contract.

It was announced in February 2012 that, owing to the codeshare agreement with Aer Lingus, the currently operated Dublin service with Aer Arann would be operated from 30 October 2012 under the brand Aer Lingus Regional. Aer Arann was later rebranded as Stobart Air. Passenger numbers on the Dublin route operated by Aer Lingus Regional, increased by 13.5% in 2014.

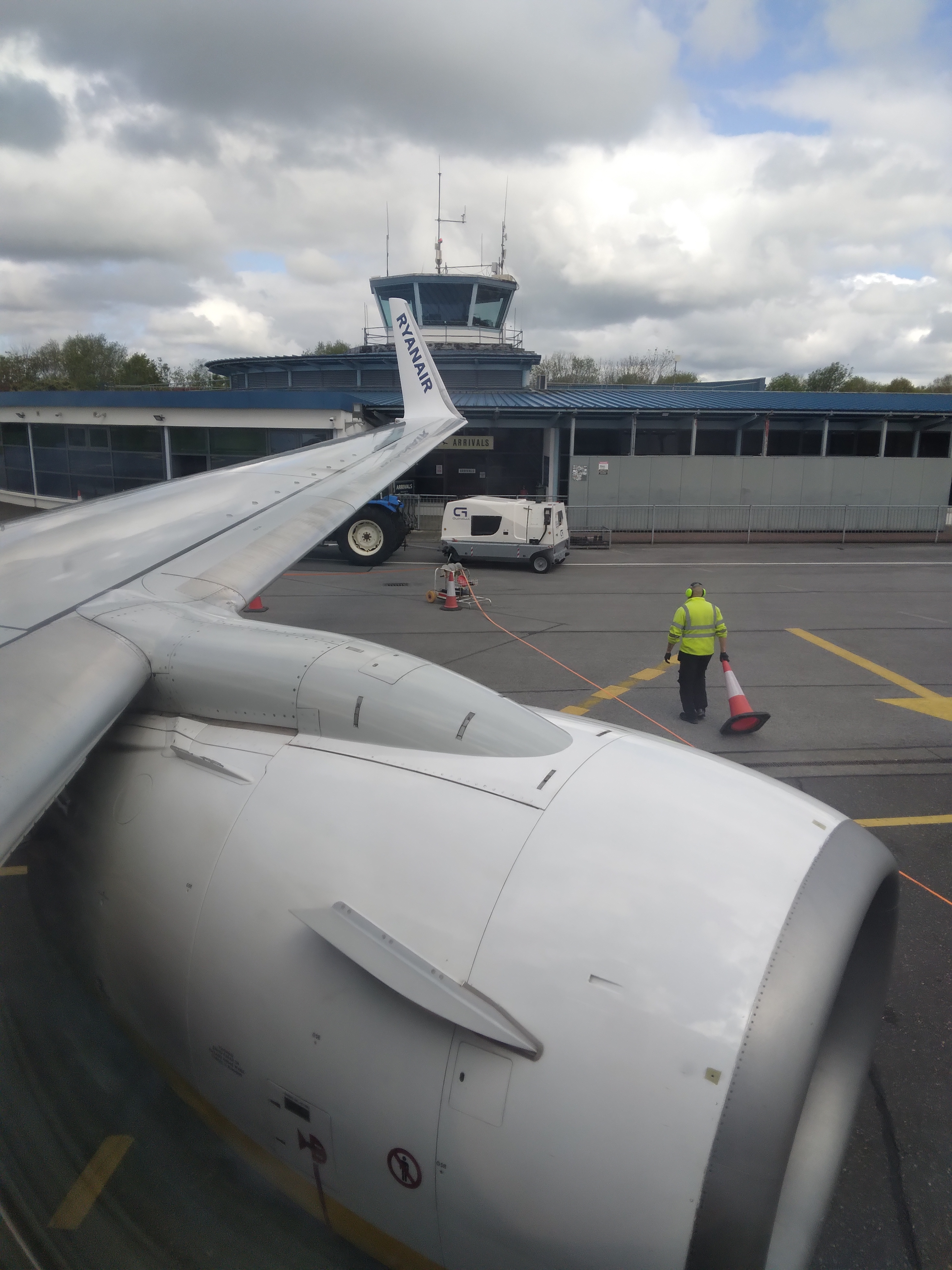
View of the terminal from within a plane readying to depart

In January 2018 Aer Lingus Regional, operated by Stobart Air, following a public tendering process was awarded a Public Service Obligation contract, linking the airport with Dublin, for the next four years. However, Stobart Air collapsed part way through. Ryanair subsequently picked up the route, this time on a commercial basis with no subsidy.

In January 2020, Ryanair announced they would commence a twice weekly flight to Manchester from 29 March 2020, every Thursday and Sunday.

Planning permission was granted in 2023 for a new two-storey extension to the terminal, additional departure gate, new arrivals & baggage reclaim area.

== Airlines and destinations ==
The following airlines operate scheduled flights to and from Kerry Airport:

Airlines	Destinations
Chalair Aviation	Seasonal: Brest, Brive, Caen, Pau
Ryanair	Dublin, Hahn, London–Luton, London–Stansted, Manchester; Seasonal: Alicante, Faro
SkyAlps	Seasonal charter: Groningen (begins 29 April 2027)

== Statistics ==
Passenger numbers
Year	Passenger numbers	% Change YoY
2005	385,825	
2006	392,576	▲1.7%
2007	391,138	▼0.4%
2008	426,115	▲8.9%
2009	356,738	▼16.3%
2010	383,866	▲7.6%
2011	310,937	▼19.0%
2012	286,442	▼7.9%
2013	306,042	▲6.8%
2014	294,955	▼3.6%
2015	303,039	▲2.7%
2016	325,670	▲7.5%
2017	335,480	▲3.0%
2018	365,339	▲8.9%
2019	369,863	▲1.2%
2020	82,959	▼77.6%
2021	115,398	▲39.1%
2022	355,043	▲207.7%
2023	414,571	▲16.8%
2024	412,034	▼0.6%
2025	440,180	▲6.8%
^{Source: Central Statistics Office}

5 busiest routes at Kerry Airport (2025)
Rank	Airport	Passengers Handled	% Change 2024/25
1	London-Luton	124,403	▲12.7%
2	Dublin	122,506	▲7.2%
3	London–Stansted	64,002	▲9.6%
4	Alicante	40,885	▲0.7%
5	Manchester Airport	33,409	▲3.1%
^{Source: Central Statistics Office}

== Ground transport ==
=== Train ===
Farranfore Airport has no direct access by rail, although Iarnród Éireann's Farranfore railway station is located 1.6 kilometres (0.99 mi) to the south-west, offering direct services to Tralee and Killarney. As of May 2023, no shuttle bus operates between the airport and the train station. However, there is a footpath along the main road to the station.

=== Road ===
Kerry Airport is located on the N23 approximately 94 kilometres (58 mi) from Limerick and approximately 106 kilometres (66 mi) from Cork. Dublin is around 286 kilometres (178 mi) away from the airport. The N22 connects Tralee and Killarney where the N23 joins up with. Car Rental services at Kerry Airport are located in the Long Term Car Park, with a range of providers offering services. Kerry Airport also offers taxis from directly outside the terminal entrance.

=== Bus ===
An airport bus terminal opened in January 2006.

Bus Éireann services from/to the airport:

- Route 14: Limerick - Killarney
- Route 40: Cork - Tralee (limited service)
- Route 271: Tralee - Castleisland - Kerry Airport - Killarney

As at 2026 the Local Link bus route 283, which goes to and from Tralee, stops at the airport.

== Incidents and accidents ==
- On 21 December 2010, Ryanair flight FR701 from London-Stansted was evacuated using emergency chutes due to smoke detected in the cockpit and cabin by passengers and crew during the landing. Investigators inspected the plane, but nothing major was found and the plane reentered service in the following days after the incident.
