= Kilgarrylander =

Civil parish in County Kerry, Ireland

Coordinates: 52.169°N 9.786°W

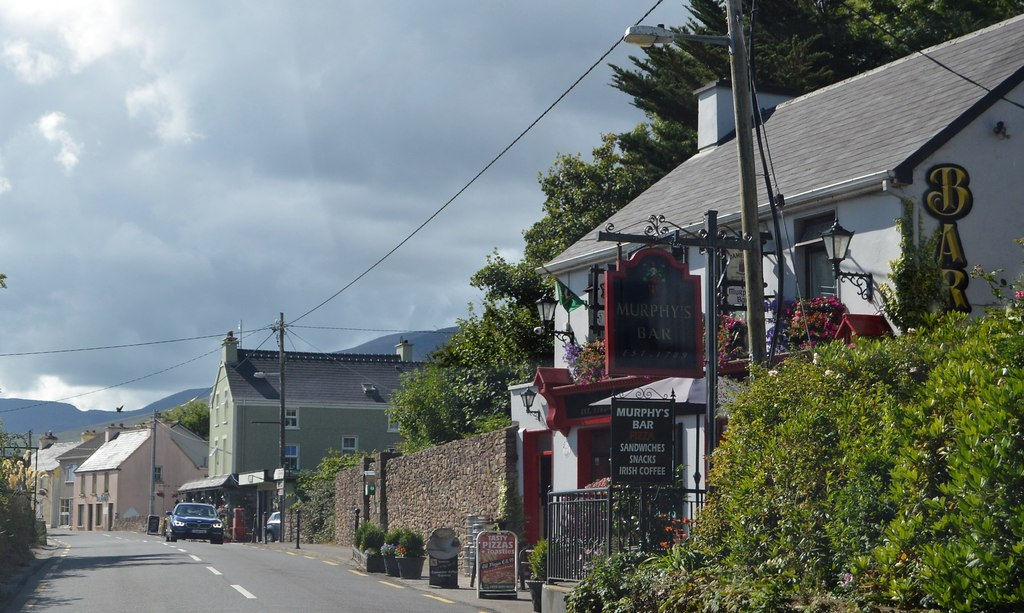
Murphy's Bar in Boolteens, Kilgarrylander

Kilgarrylander (Irish: Cill Gharraí an Lóndraigh) is a civil parish and electoral division in County Kerry, Ireland. Located on the north side of Castlemaine Harbour, it has an area of approximately 60 square kilometres (23 sq mi) and is in the historical barony of Trughanacmy. Population centres in Kilgarrylander civil parish include Fybagh and Boolteens.
