= Patrickswell =

Town in County Limerick, Ireland

Patrickswell Irish: Tobar Phádraig
- Town
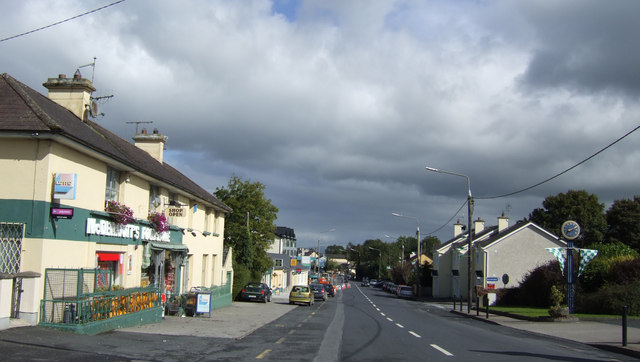
- Main Street

- Location in Ireland
- Coordinates: 52°35′43″N 8°42′44″W
- Country: Ireland
- Province: Munster
- County: County Limerick
- Elevation: 30 m (98 ft)

Population (2022)
  - Total: 848
- Irish Grid Reference: R518500

Patrickswell, historically known as Toberpatrick (Irish: Tobar Phádraig), is a small town in County Limerick, Ireland. It is primarily a commuter village for people working in Limerick, including the nearby industrial suburb of Raheen. The population was 848 at the 2022 census.

== Etymology ==
The name of the town refers to a holy well which is traditionally associated with Saint Patrick. Located on the main street, this well was previously capped by a pump - since removed. In the early 19th century, a rough statue of Saint Patrick was erected at the well.

== History ==
Evidence of ancient settlement in the area includes a number of ringfort, fulacht fiadh and lime kiln sites in the surrounding townlands of Attyflin, Ballyanrahan East and Barnakyle. Protected structures, within the town, include St. Patrick's holy well, an 18th-century milestone, a lime kiln and the 19th-century Royal Irish Constabulary barracks.

The former Patrickswell Railway Station, also a protected structure, was built in 1856 on the main Limerick–Tralee railway line. No longer used as a railway station, it is now in private ownership and home to an engineering consulting firm. A contemporary extension to the original station building was designed by Rob Shanahan architects and won an OPUS Building of the year award in 2004.

According to local historian Mainchín Seoighe (1924–2006), the present-day ecclesiastical parish of Patrickswell-Ballybrown is made up of parts of the pre-Reformation parishes of Kilkeedy, Killonahan, Mungret, Croom, and Adare. Until the middle of the 18th century, the parishes of Kilkeedy and Clounanna were joined with Adare. When the parish of Patrickswell was formed, Kilkeedy and Clounanna became part of the new parish.

During the Irish Civil War, the town played a role in the Battle of Kilmallock of 1922, when Anti-Treaty IRA troops dug in at Patrickswell to prevent Pro-Treaty National Army forces from reaching Limerick city.

== Location and transport ==
The town is located near to the N20/N21 road which, until Patrickswell was bypassed in 2001, ran through the town centre. This road is now the R526 from west of the town to Limerick city. The town can be accessed at either end from the N20 junction for Limerick Racecourse or the N20/N21 junction further west (where the R526 commences).

A railway line to Adare and Foynes passes alongside the town to the south, although Patrickswell station is long closed. Patrickswell railway station originally opened on 12 July 1856, closed for passenger traffic on 4 February 1963 and finally closed altogether on 2 December 1974. The Ballingrane–Tralee (North Kerry) line closed in November 1975. The station was, at one time, known as Patrickswell Junction and direct Limerick–Cork trains diverged here from the route of trains bound for Foynes, Newcastle West and Tralee. While passenger services ceased in 1963, freight trains between Limerick and Foynes ran until 2000.

== Amenities ==
Patrickswell's main street has several shops, a garage, ATM and a post office. The town is located approximately 10 km from Limerick city, and as a result, relies on the city and its suburbs for secondary schools, shops, banks and other facilities.

There are several housing estates in the area, including several off the main street and road to Clarina. The latter road has strip development north from Patrickswell all the way to Clarina and the N69 road.

== Politics ==
Patrickswell is located within the Limerick City West local authority area of Limerick City and County Council and within the Limerick City constituency for national politics.

== See also ==
- List of towns and villages in Ireland
