= Crag Cave =

Cave in County Kerry, Ireland

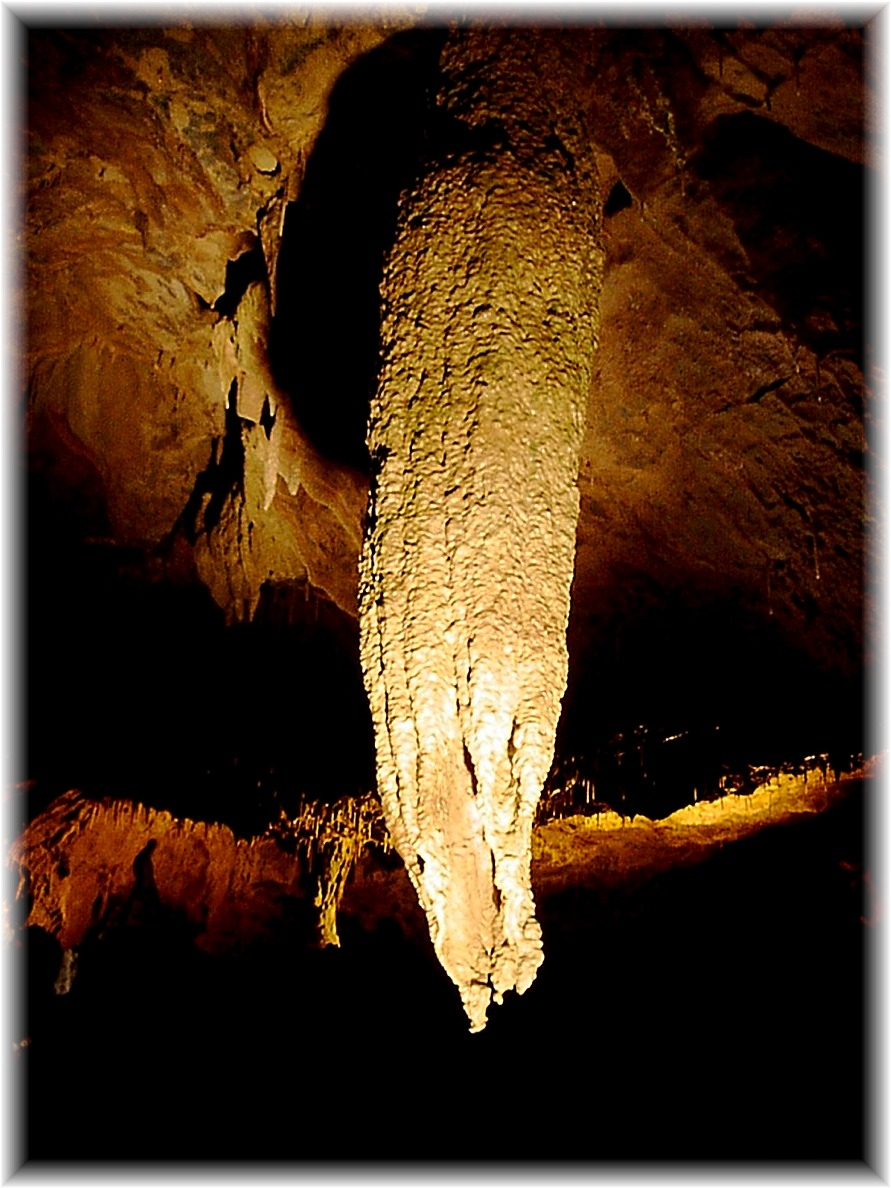
- The Big Stalactite in Crag Cave
- Interactive map of Crag Cave
- Location: Castleisland, County Kerry, Ireland
- Coordinates: 52.247°N 9.445°W
- Length: 3.8 kilometres (2.4 mi)
- Discovery: Entrance pre-1859 Passages 1981–1985
- Geology: Limestone
- Entrances: 1
- Entrances list: Show cave entrance
- Access: Show cave

Crag Cave is a cave in Ireland, located just outside Castleisland, County Kerry.

Formed in elevated limestone rock, the system extends to 3.8 kilometres (2.4 mi) of surveyed passage, on two levels. It is the 7th-longest cave system in the Republic of Ireland, and the 10th-longest in the whole of Ireland.

== History of exploration ==
While the Geological Survey of Ireland in 1859 acknowledged the presence of "caves worn by water, some of which can be traversed for some distance," positive efforts at exploration were not made until 1981, when the upper part of the cave was explored to a sump, named the "Green Lake". When hydrological testing of water both in the cave's active streamway and in the sump showed that the two were chemically distinct from each other, it was postulated that the sump was only "perched" above the water table and that further dry passage might be found on the far side. The sump was dived by Martyn Farr in 1983, providing the first access to the large caverns beyond. A boulder obstruction nearby was passed, allowing a dry connection into the new chambers. Following the breakthrough, 1.6 km (1 mi) of passage was explored and surveyed.

Between 1981 and 1985, further exploration and surveying brought the total length of the cave to 3.81 km (2.37 mi), with a vertical range of approximately 15 m (49 ft). The entire cave system runs under Castleisland itself, starting at Glounsharoon and ending on the far side of town at the Killarney Road.

== Show cave ==
Around 350 metres (1,150 ft) of the Crag Cave system was developed as a show cave by local residents Dr. Donal and Mrs Margaret Geaney, under whose land the cave was first discovered. The cave was developed between 1987 and 1989 by building a shaft (which is the only man-made entrance) and putting in pathways, railings, lights and a music system.

== See also ==
- List of caves
- Dingle Peninsula
