= Mungret Abbey =

Medieval friary, County Limerick, Ireland

- Mainistir Mhungairit
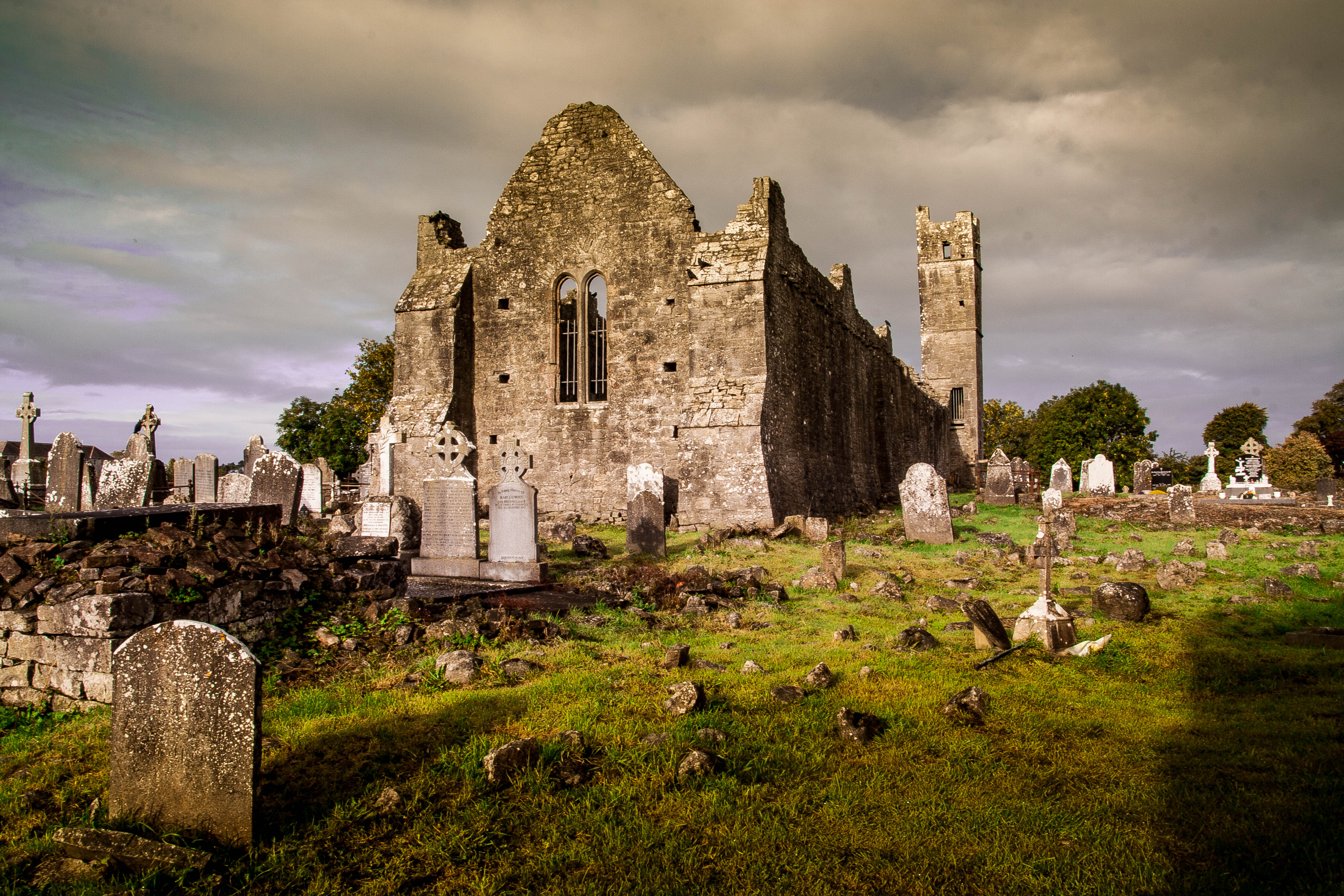
- Mungret Abbey

- Location within Ireland
- Interactive map of Mungret Abbey

Monastery information
- Other names: Moungairid, Cathair Dheocain Neasán
- Order: Canons Regular of Saint Augustine (some time in the 12th century)
- Established: before 551
- Diocese: Limerick

People
- Founder: Saint Neasan

Architecture
- Status: ruined
- Style: Norman

Site
- Location: Baunacloka/Dromdarrig, Dooradoyle, County Limerick
- Coordinates: 52.634306°N 8.675514°W
- Public access: no

Mungret Abbey is a medieval friary and National Monument located near Mungret in County Limerick, Ireland.

== Location ==
Mungret Abbey is located immediately west of Dooradoyle and northeast of Mungret College, 4 kilometres (2.5 mi) southwest of Limerick city centre, to the south of the Shannon Estuary.

== History ==
Mungret was an early monastic site, founded before AD 551 by Saint Nessan (Neasán) the Deacon. At one point there may have been as many as 1,500 monks and six churches operating in competition to attract followers. John O'Donovan claimed a fourth-century date, predating Saint Patrick.

In 908, Cormac mac Cuilennáin, King of Munster, gifted the abbey three ounces of gold and a satin chasuble. It was plundered on four occasions in the 9th century by Vikings. High King Domnall Ua Lochlainn destroyed the monastery in 1107.

Mungret claimed episcopal status 1152, but was deemed to be too close to Limerick. 1179 the then king of Munster, Domnall Mór Ua Briain, granted the monastery to Brictius, Bishop of Limerick. Mungret then became a parish church (built 1251−72), operated by the Augustinian Canons Regular.

The antiquary Austin Cooper wrote about Mungret in 1781. Mungret Abbey church was used by the Church of Ireland until 1822. The building was extended and the tower, the priest's living quarters, was added during the 15th century.

A bell was found at Loghmore nearby, called the Bell of Mungret.

== Buildings ==
=== Mungret Abbey ===
Located in the west of the group. A nave and chancel church with a square tower at the west.

=== Old Mungret Church ===
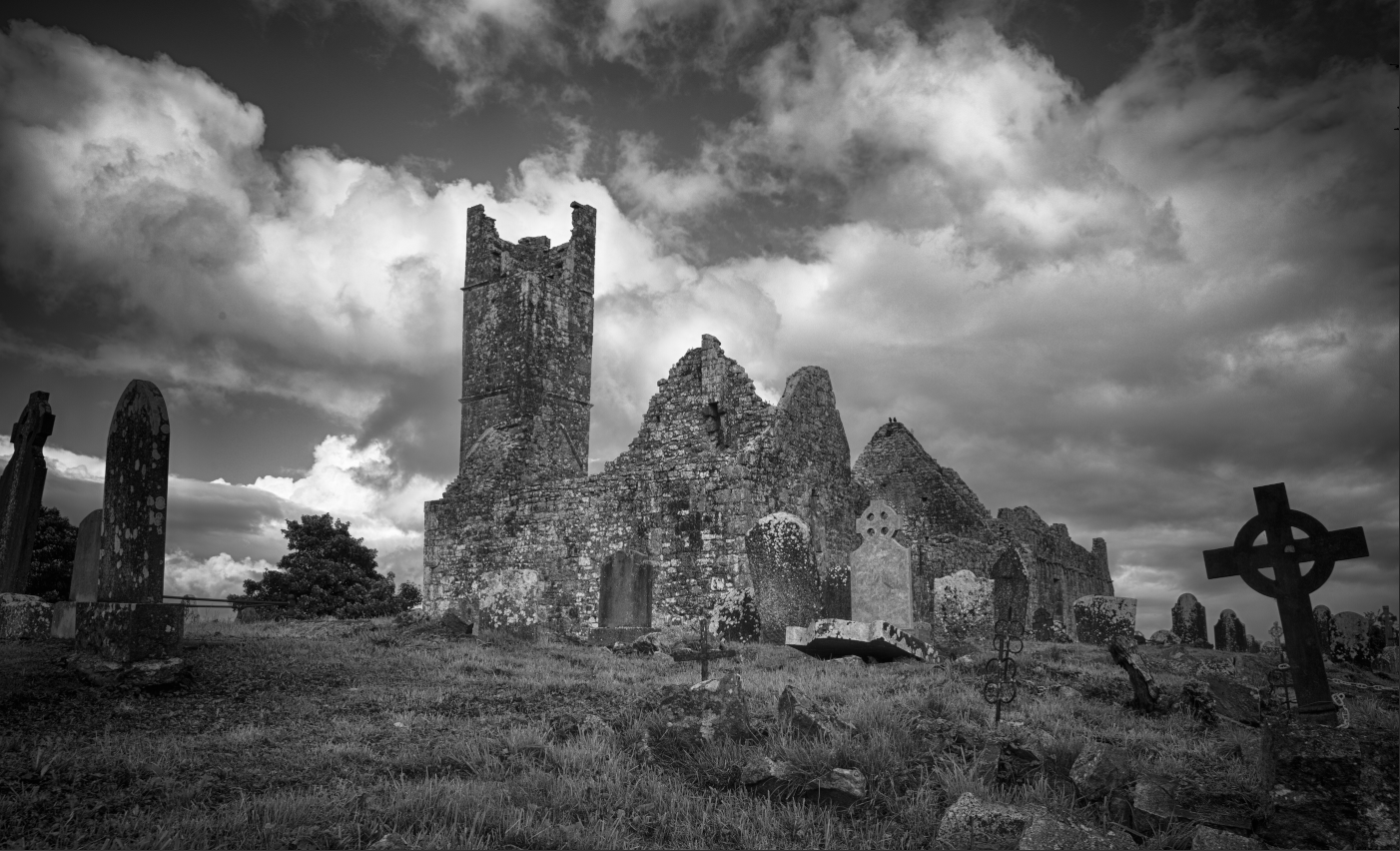
Black and white image of Mungret church ruin

A small rectangular pre-Norman church with three small windows. It is not later than the 1100. There is a lintelled doorway with inclined jambs leading into the nave, which is the oldest part of the church.

=== St. Nessan's Church ===
Also called the Monastery Church, it is located in the north of the group. Built around the 12th century, it is rectangular with high gables, a lintelled west doorway and a small round-headed east window.
