= Shaws Department Stores =

Irish department store chain

Shaw & Sons Ltd
- Industry: Retail
- Genre: Department stores
- Founded: 1864; 162 years ago in Mountmellick
- Founder: Henry Shaw
- Headquarters: Portlaoise, Ireland
- Number of locations: 17 (2026)
- Area served: Ireland
- Key people: Jonathan Shaw (managing director), Conrad Digan (CEO)
- Revenue: €70.5 million (2024)
- Operating income: €847,687 (2024)
- Number of employees: 702 (2024)
- Website: shaws.ie

Shaws Department Stores is an Irish department store chain founded by Henry Shaw in 1864. It began as a small drapery shop in Mountmellick, County Laois.

== History ==
The drapery shop in Mountmellick was operated by Henry Shaw and his wife, Annie. After opening shops in Portlaoise and Athy, the business was registered as a limited company in 1934. During the early to mid 20th century, the business was controlled by William Henry Shaw and then Samuel Shaw. In the late 20th and early 21st centuries, brothers Mervyn, Trevor and Billy Shaw controlled the business.

Shaws opened a shop in Carlow in 1949. In the mid 20th century, the business also expanded into Waterford, Roscrea, Fermoy and Limerick. In the 1970s, Shaws opened a shop in Dungarvan. It later opened a second shop in the town, which primarily stocked electrical products. In 2024, the electrical shop was closed.

In 1976, Shaws acquired the Haddens department store chain, with the Carlow shop remaining under the Haddens name but the shops in Wexford and Dungarvan being rebranded as Shaws. In 1984, Haddens in Carlow was destroyed by fire and was rebuilt in the following years.

Between 2003 and 2008, the business opened new or refurbished shops in Wexford, Carlow, Castlebar, Drogheda and Ballina. In 2013, the business moved to a new 20,000 square foot shop in Portlaoise, closing one of its earliest locations, which had operated for 109 years.

During the 2010s, a dispute arose among the Shaw family in relation to the control of the business. In 2014, the managing director was Jonathan Shaw, grandson of Samuel Shaw. The dispute was ultimately settled in March 2016, with the chairman and a number of directors and family members leaving the business.

In late 2024, the business opened a shop in Athlone. As of 2025, the business had 16 shops throughout Ireland, employed over 700 people, and continued to be owned by the Shaw family.

In April 2026, Shaws opened a new shop in Clonmel, bringing its total to 17. The current CEO is Conrad Digan, the first non-family member to hold that role in Shaws.

For many years the tagline for the department store was "Almost Nationwide". With the opening of more stores in the 21st century, this has been updated to "All for you".
