= Templeglantine =

Village in County Limerick, Ireland

Templeglantine Teampall an Ghleanntáin
- Village
- Location in Ireland
- Coordinates: 52°23′35″N 9°11′00″W
- Country: Ireland
- Province: Munster
- County: County Limerick
- Local electoral area: Newcastle West
- Dáil constituency: Limerick County
- EU Parliament: South
- Elevation: 127 m (417 ft)
- Time zone: UTC+0 (WET)
  - Summer (DST): UTC-1 (IST (WEST))
- Irish Grid Reference: R180268

Templeglantine (pronounced "Temple-glan-tin"), officially Templeglentan (Irish: Teampall an Ghleanntáin, meaning 'church of the little glen'), is a village in County Limerick, Ireland. It is often simply referred to as 'Glantine' by natives and other west Limerick locals.

== Location ==
The village is in the west of the county, between Newcastle West and Abbeyfeale on the N21 road. The village is 48 km south-west of the centre of Limerick city, and 38 km east of Tralee.

== History ==
The Irish for Templeglantine is "Teampall an Ghleanntáin", which means "the church of the little glen". Templeglantine is historically known locally as 'Inse Bán' or "Inchabaun", which, when translated, means 'the White River meadow'.

Templeglantine is a chapel village, having grown up around the church, which was built in 1829. A community centre was officially opened in 1977 by Bishop Jeremiah Newman. In the same year, the village received the Glór na nGael trophy from the then President of Ireland, Patrick Hillery. This is an award for the place in Ireland that does the most to promote the use of the Irish language throughout the previous year.

The O'Macasa family ruled the area until the twelfth century when the Norman invasion brought the Fitzgerald family to rule over the area. The Fitzgeralds held the more auspicious title of 'The Earls of Desmond'.

After the defeat of the Desmonds in 1583, the area came under the control of Sir William Courtenay who planted most of west Limerick. The de Lacy family were also landlords in the area.

In 1985 a cist grave was discovered on the lands of James Leahy in the townland of Rathcahill West. These graves are box-like slab structures, which are just below ground level. They are believed to date from between 2000 BC to 500 BC.

== Amenities ==
The village currently has a church, a school, a shop and post office, a pub, a community hall named Halla Inse Bán, the Devon Inn Hotel and a small housing estate called Ascaill Inse Bán. There are two playing pitches in the parish; Glantine F.C.'s pitch is located in the village, opposite the Devon Hotel. Templeglantine GAA's playing pitch is located just outside the village, at an area known locally as 'Dores Cross'.

The village lies on the Great Southern Trail greenway.

== Transport ==
Templeglantine is well connected by road, being on the N21 national primary road which is the main road between Limerick and Tralee. By road, the village is 53 km from the centre of Limerick city, and 47 km from Tralee. It is also on Bus Éireann routes 13 (which runs between Limerick and Tralee), and 14 (which runs between Limerick and Killarney).

== Sport ==
=== Templeglantine GAA Club ===
Templeglantine GAA Club (formed in 1898) is solely a Hurling club which currently competes at Junior A level in Limerick GAA. It currently plays in the West Limerick Junior A Hurling Championship. The club originally played as 'Templeglantine Owen Roes' or 'Eoin Ruas' at various times in the past. The club colours are Green & Gold hoops. The crest features the parish church, from which the village grew, the scenic Tullig Wood in the western end of the parish and the famous Barnagh Tunnel in the eastern side of the parish.

The club's facilities include a playing pitch, clubhouse/dressing rooms, viewing stand and viewing bank and a team gymnasium. The playing pitch is due to be upgraded in 2016. The club does not field any Gaelic Football teams.

The club has previously been amalgamated at Minor and U21 level with neighbours Tournafulla GAA as Allaughan Gaels (currently only joined at U21 level as of 2015). Allaughan Gaels won 3 West Limerick Minor titles in a row from 2009 to 2011, adding a County Minor B Hurling title in 2009. They also won West U21 A Hurling titles in 2009, 2011 and 2013.

Templeglantine GAA have won County Limerick Junior Hurling titles in 1937, 1993, 2007 and 2013. The club reached the Munster Junior B Hurling Championship Final in February 2014, drawing with Holycross/Ballycahill of Tipperary in the final played at 'The Bog Garden' in Rathkeale. Holycross/Ballycahill subsequently defeated Templeglantine in the All-Ireland Junior B Hurling Final Replay at Raheenagh in March 2014.

=== Glantine F.C. ===
The local soccer club is called Glantine F.C. (formerly Glantine Rovers) whose club colours are Red & Yellow. Former professional Footballer John McGrath played his underage football with the club. The club was formed in 1982. It currently competes in the Limerick Desmond League Division 2 (as of 2021).

== Traditional music ==
There is a rich tradition of Irish culture, especially Irish Traditional Music in Templeglantine. The parish is part of the Sliabh Luachra area of traditional music around the border areas of counties Kerry, Cork, and Limerick. The local Comhaltas Ceoltóirí Éireann branch is called CCÉ Teampall an Ghleanntáin. They teach traditional music to students from 'Glantine' and the surrounding area. They have competed successfully at Limerick, Munster and All-Ireland Fleadhanna and have won several All-Ireland titles in céilidhs and Grúpaí Ceoil. The branch also compete in wrenboy competitions. The Templeglantine Céilí Band is very well known and frequently perform at céilidh and concerts in the Sliabh Luachra area. Céilithe are also frequently held at the Devon hotel in the village.

== Notable people ==
- John Buckley (born 1951), contemporary classical composer
- Michael Hartnett the Irish poet, who grew up in nearby Newcastle West resided in Templeglantine from 1974 to 1984
- David Neligan 'The Spy in the Castle', a key man in Michael Collins' Intelligence War against the British Administration in Ireland during the War of Independence. Subsequently, one of the founding members of the Gardaí (Police Force) in Ireland.

== See also ==
- List of towns and villages in Ireland
