= Trughanacmy =

Barony in County Kerry, Ireland

Trughanacmy Triúcha an Aicme (Irish)
- Barony
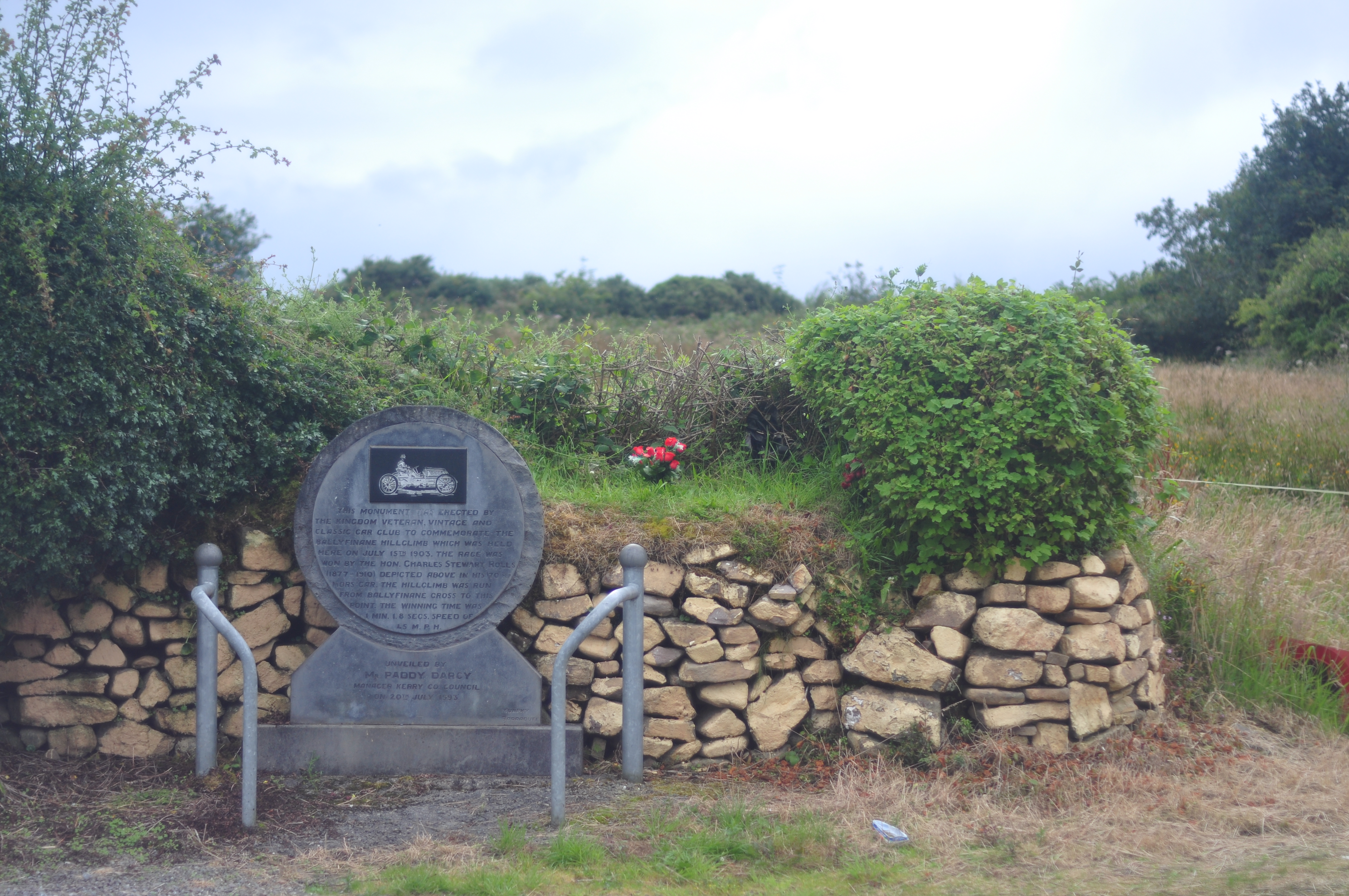
- Ballfinnane

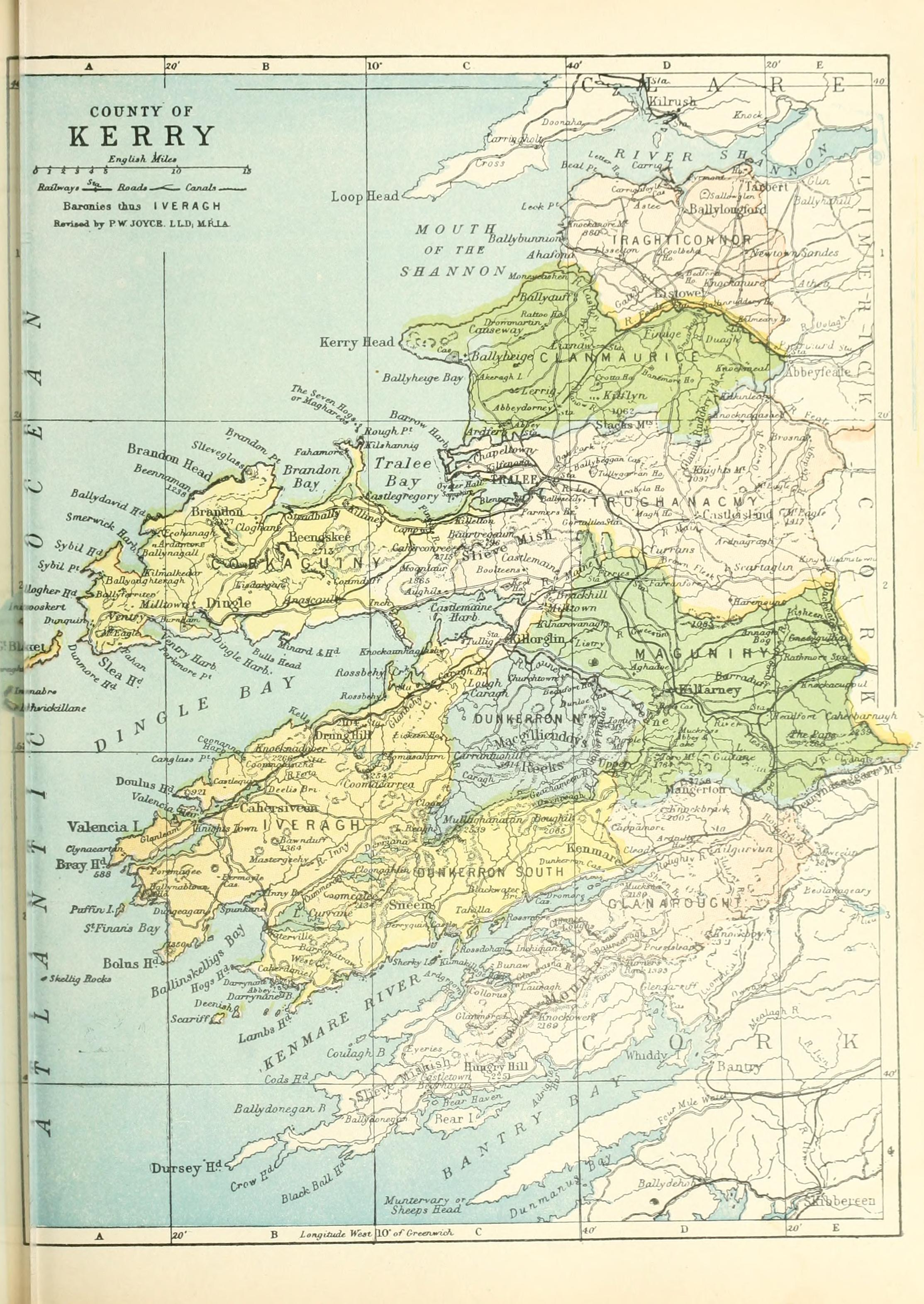
- Barony map of County Kerry, 1900; Trughanacmy barony is in the east, coloured peach.

- Location within Ireland
- Coordinates: 52°13′N 9°40′W
- Sovereign state: Ireland
- Province: Munster
- County: Kerry

Area
  - Total: 787.5 km^{2} (304.1 sq mi)

Trughanacmy (Irish: Triúcha an Aicme) is a barony in County Kerry, Ireland. The barony is an obsolete administrative area, having ceased to have any government function since the enactment of the Local Government (Ireland) Act 1898.

In 1881 the barony had an area of 195,147 acres (789.73 km^{2}).

== Name ==
The name of the barony was derived from the Irish Triocha Chead an Aicme Chiarraighe, or "Barony of the Ciarraige". The Ciarraighe, or "people of Ciar" were the pre-Gaelic tribe who lived in area, and who gave their name to the county.

== Parishes ==
The barony contained the whole or part of twenty-one civil parishes:

- Annagh (part)
- Ardfert (part: Ardfert Village is in the Barony of Clanmaurice)
- Ballincuslane
- Ballymacelligott
- Ballynahaglish
- Ballyseedy
- Brosna
- Castleisland
- Clogherbrien
- Currans (part)
- Dysert
- Fenit
- Kilcolman (part)
- Kilgarrylander
- Kileentierna (part)
- Killorglin (part)
- Kiltallagh
- Nohaval
- O'Brennan
- Ratass
- Tralee
