= Castleisland =

Town in County Kerry, Ireland

Castleisland Oileán Ciarraí (Irish)
- Town
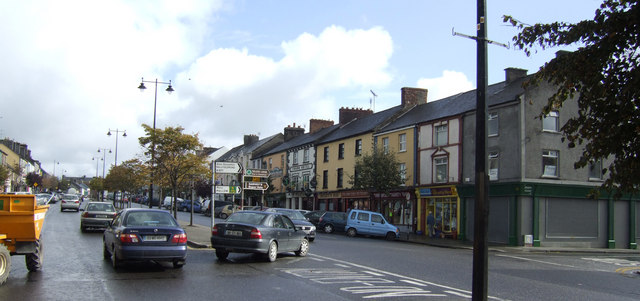
- Main Street, Castleisland, County Kerry

- Location in Ireland
- Coordinates: 52.2307°N 9.4647°W
- Country: Ireland
- Province: Munster
- County: County Kerry
- Elevation: 32 m (105 ft)

Population (2022)
  - Total: 2,536
- Irish Grid Reference: Q998099

Castleisland (Irish: Oileán Ciarraí) is a town and commercial centre in County Kerry in south west Ireland. The town is known for the width of its main street. As of the 2022 census, Castleisland had a population of 2,536.

Castleisland was described by one of its citizens, journalist Con Houlihan, as "not so much a town as a street between two fields".

== History ==
Historical population
Year	Pop.	±%
1821	1,539	—
1831	1,569	+1.9%
1841	1,687	+7.5%
1851	2,582	+53.1%
1861	1,702	−34.1%
1871	1,767	+3.8%
1881	1,466	−17.0%
1891	1,559	+6.3%
1901	1,497	−4.0%
1911	1,333	−11.0%
1926	1,269	−4.8%
1936	1,325	+4.4%
1946	1,427	+7.7%
1951	1,491	+4.5%
1956	1,654	+10.9%
1961	1,718	+3.9%
1966	1,673	−2.6%
1971	1,929	+15.3%
1981	2,226	+15.4%
1986	2,281	+2.5%
1991	2,207	−3.2%
1996	2,233	+1.2%
2002	2,162	−3.2%
2006	2,300	+6.4%
2011	2,513	+9.3%
2016	2,486	−1.1%
2022	2,536	+2.0%

Castleisland was the centre of Desmond power in Kerry. The village got its name, 'Castle of the Island of Kerry', from a castle built in 1226 by Geoffrey Maurice (or de Marisco). Maurice had been the Lord Justice of Ireland during the reign of King Henry III. The island was created by turning the waters of the River Maine into a moat around the castle.

Sometime in the 120 years after its construction, the castle was taken by the forces of the Fitzgerald dynasty. It is known that in 1345 the castle was being held for Maurice FitzGerald, 2nd Earl of Desmond by Sir Eustace de la Poer and other knights when it was captured by Sir Raoul d'Ufford, Chief governor of Ireland. Sir Eustace and the other knights were captured and executed. Little is known of the further history of the castle and few ruins are left of it today. The main ruin is the de Marisco tower, located behind some private houses at the western end of the town, on the Killarney Road.

The Black and Tans and the Irish Republican Army (IRA) were active in Castleisland during the Irish War of Independence in the 1920s. On 8 May 1921, two Royal Irish Constabulary (RIC) men were shot by the IRA while leaving Castleisland Parish Church; one of the men died. Two months later, on 10 July 1921, three IRA men and four British soldiers were killed during a gunfight in the town.

A vagrant juvenile bald eagle was captured near Castleisland in November 1987, exhausted after reputedly flying across the Atlantic Ocean from North America.

== Geography ==
Castleisland is in the east of County Kerry, 16 km east of Tralee and 19 km north of Killarney. The town is close to the County Limerick border and to the County Cork border, and the main road in western and southern Kerry passes through here. The N21 road from the city of Limerick continues on to Tralee while the N22 road goes to Killarney and other towns in southern Kerry.

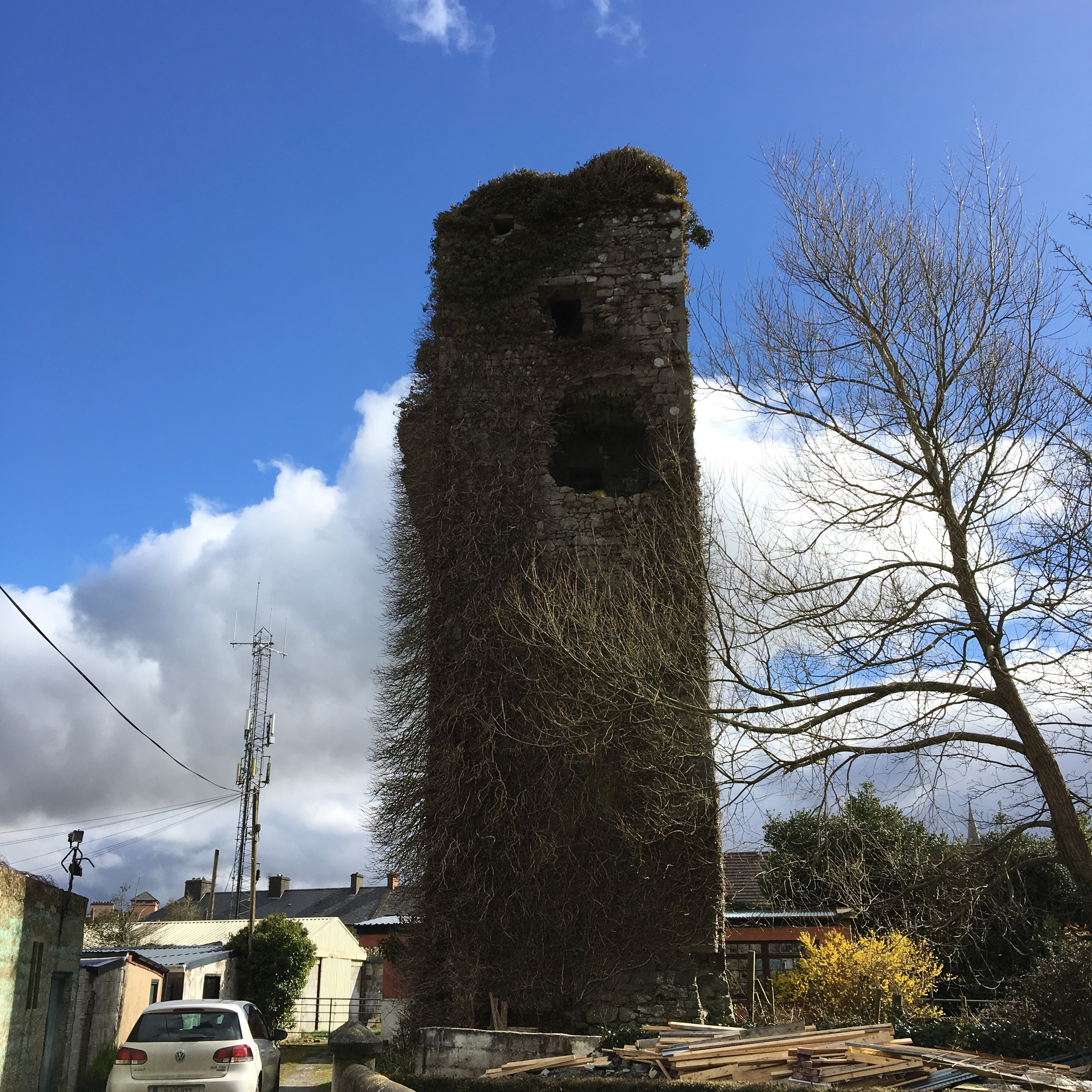
Ruins in Castleisland, County Kerry

The Glanaruddery Mountains to the north and the Stack's Mountains to the west define the beginning of the Vale of Tralee, at the mouth of which Castleisland is situated. Most of the land around Castleisland is pasture for dairy stock, with bogland located at various locations around the town, particularly to the east and south. It is in the barony of Trughanacmy.

== Buildings and places of note ==
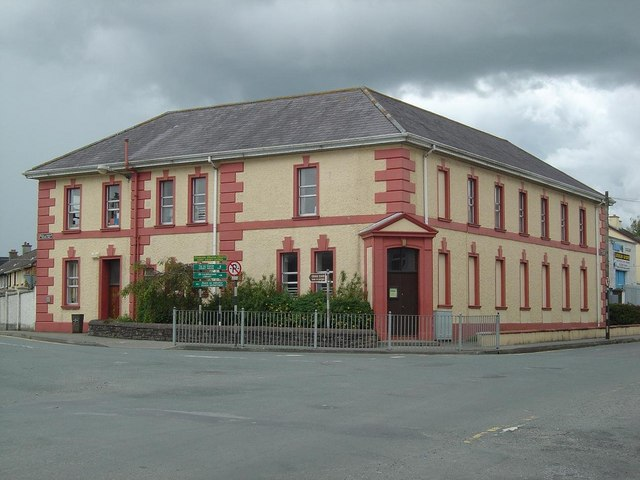
Castleisland courthouse and Carnegie library

There are several buildings of note in Castleisland, including the Gothic-styled Church of St. Stephen and St. John which was designed by Doolin and built in 1880. The town's Carnegie Trust Library building was designed by R.M. Butler for Tralee District Council. A tender by James O'Connor, Castleisland, for £1,451.4s.7d. was accepted, subject to the approval of the architect. It was completed by 1915. The library was burnt down in 1920, and replaced by the present structure in 1929 and is located at the eastern end of Castleisland's main street. The function of the town library was moved to new premises in 2008, but the original building is still used as the district court for the area.

Crag Cave, one of the most extensive cave systems in Ireland open to the public, is located just outside Castleisland.

== Transport ==
=== Rail ===
Castleisland railway station opened on 30 August 1875. It closed for passenger traffic on 24 February 1947 and for goods traffic on 3 November 1975, finally closing altogether on 10 January 1977.

=== Road ===
Since the 1990s, traffic congestion had been an issue for Castleisland, as the main road linking most of County Kerry to Limerick and Dublin passed through the town. As a result, the main street through Castleisland dealt not only with local traffic, but also traffic destined for Tralee and Killarney. This resulted in traffic congestion in Castleisland, with delays of over half an hour possible at peak times. Ultimately, the local community decided that action was needed and, ahead of the 2007 Irish general election, a formal lobbying campaign was started.

With funding allocated by the National Roads Authority, construction of the new road started in May 2009. The project involved creating two major new sections of road and one smaller section. It consists of a 3.4 km dual carriageway linking the Limerick road roundabout north of Castleisland to the Tralee road west of the town, and a 1.6 km single carriageway continuing south from the roundabout on the Tralee road to meet the Killarney road roundabout southwest of the town. At the Limerick road end, there is also a 0.4 km section of single carriageway that links the newly constructed Limerick road roundabout to the pre-existing N21 Limerick road. On 22 October 2010, the bypass was officially opened by the then Minister for Defence, Tony Killeen.

== Sport ==
Castleisland Desmonds is the local GAA club. They won the All-Ireland Senior Club Football Championship in 1985, beating St. Vincents of Dublin in the final. The club were also the winner of the 2010 series of RTÉ reality television show Celebrity Bainisteoir, while managed by singer Derek Burke of Crystal Swing.

Castleisland A.F.C. are the town's representatives in the Kerry District League in soccer.

Castleisland Rugby Football Club U16s was the second rugby club in Kerry, under all age groups, to win a Munster League title in 2008.

An Ríocht Athletics Club, established in 1973, is located at Crageens in Castleisland. Its facilities include a 400-metre tartan athletics track and a soccer pitch. A gym, Barracks Gym, was established in 2018 on Barrack Street in Castleisland.

St Marys is the local basketball club.

== Town twinning ==
Castleisland became twinned with the town of Bannalec in France on 14 August 2007.

== People ==
- Denis Mary Bradley (1846–1903), Catholic priest who became the first Bishop of Manchester, New Hampshire and co-founded Saint Anselm College.
- Mick Doyle (1941–2004), Irish rugby union international player and coach. While Doyle was coach, Ireland won the Five Nations and subsequent Triple Crown. He was born in Currow, a parish just outside Castleisland.
- Con Houlihan (1925–2012), sports journalist and columnist for the Evening Herald and Irish Press group newspapers.
- Katherine Kelly (b. 1979), British actress known for her role Coronation Street, is the daughter of John Kelly, who originally hails from Castleisland.
- Charlie Nelligan (b. 1957), Kerry GAA goalkeeper during the 1970s and 1980s who won 7 All-Ireland football medals. Nelligan played his club football with the Castleisland Desmonds, who won the All-Ireland Senior Club Football Championship in 1985.
- Redmond Prendiville (1900–1968), Archbishop of Perth; reputedly the youngest archbishop ever and aged 32 at the time of his consecration.
- Larry Sharpe (1951–2017), professional wrestler and wrestling trainer was born in Castleisland.

== See also ==
- List of towns and villages in Ireland
- Market Houses in Ireland
