= Dooradoyle =

Suburb of Limerick city, Ireland

Dooradoyle Tuar an Daill
- Suburb
- Location in Ireland
- Coordinates: 52°38′26″N 8°38′46″W
- Country: Ireland
- Province: Munster
- City: Limerick
- Time zone: UTC+0 (WET)
  - Summer (DST): UTC-1 (IST (WEST))
- Irish Grid Reference: R550540

Dooradoyle (Irish: Tuar an Daill) is a large suburb of Limerick, Ireland. It is one of Limerick's newer suburbs, and is home to the campus of University Hospital Limerick and the Crescent Shopping Centre.

== Etymology ==
The name Dooradoyle (Irish: Tuar an Daill) means "paddock of the blind man", where "tuar" means paddock or field, and "dall" refers to a blind person. Other sources translate "tuar" as a bleach-green — a stretch of grass set aside for the drying and bleaching of linen.

== Description ==
It is part of the Ecclesiastical parish of St Paul in the Roman Catholic Diocese of Limerick. St Paul's was created in 1971, partitioned from the parish of Mungret - Raheen - Crecora, though some parts of Dooradoyle remain in that parish.

Until June 2014, Dooradoyle was the site of the administrative offices of Limerick County Council. Since the merger of Limerick City Council and Limerick County Council these offices have become civic offices for the merged Limerick City and County Council. Several attempts were made by Limerick City Council to expand its area of control to include Castletroy, Raheen, and Dooradoyle: all until recently administered by Limerick County Council. Since the merger of the authorities the district has become part of the Limerick Metropolitan district which enlarged the city area to include the large suburban districts such as Dooradoyle.

Dooradoyle is located in the south west area of Limerick City on the R526 road (formerly the main N20 route), also called St Nessan's Road. The suburb is now bypassed by the M20 motorway to the south. The earliest developments in the area began in the 1960s, and Dooradoyle has experienced rapid growth since.

== Services ==
The Civic Offices of Limerick City and County Council are in Dooradoyle, along with the county's motor tax office and the county library headquarters. The Crescent Shopping Centre, Ireland's largest shopping centre outside of Dublin, is located in Dooradoyle. The Omniplex, Limerick's largest cinema with twelve screens, is on the site of the Crescent Shopping Centre. There are also smaller, local shops, bars and restaurants, along with a leisure centre and gym.

Dooradoyle is the location of the campus of University Hospital Limerick, the biggest hospital in the mid west of Ireland.

== Religion ==
St Paul's is the area's Roman Catholic church. Dooradoyle is also home to the Limerick Mosque and a meeting hall of the Church of Jesus Christ of Latter-day Saints.

Mungret Abbey, an ancient monastery, is located just outside Dooradoyle.

== Education ==
The main primary school serving the area is St Paul's NS, though students in some estates in Dooradoyle are zoned to St Nessan's NS in nearby Mungret. The area is also home to St Gabriel's School, a special education school, and Gaelscoil an Ráithín, an Irish-medium school.

Dooradoyle is home to Crescent College, a comprehensive secondary school.

== Sports ==
Regional United is an amateur football club based in Glencairin, Dooradoyle. The home ground of Garryowen is located in Dooradoyle, while Old Crescent and Young Munster are both based in the neighbouring townland of Rosbrien. The local GAA club is Mungret St. Pauls which covers the Dooradoyle, Raheen, Mungret and Ballycummin areas.
