= N69 road (Ireland) =

Road in Ireland

N69 road
- Bóthar N69
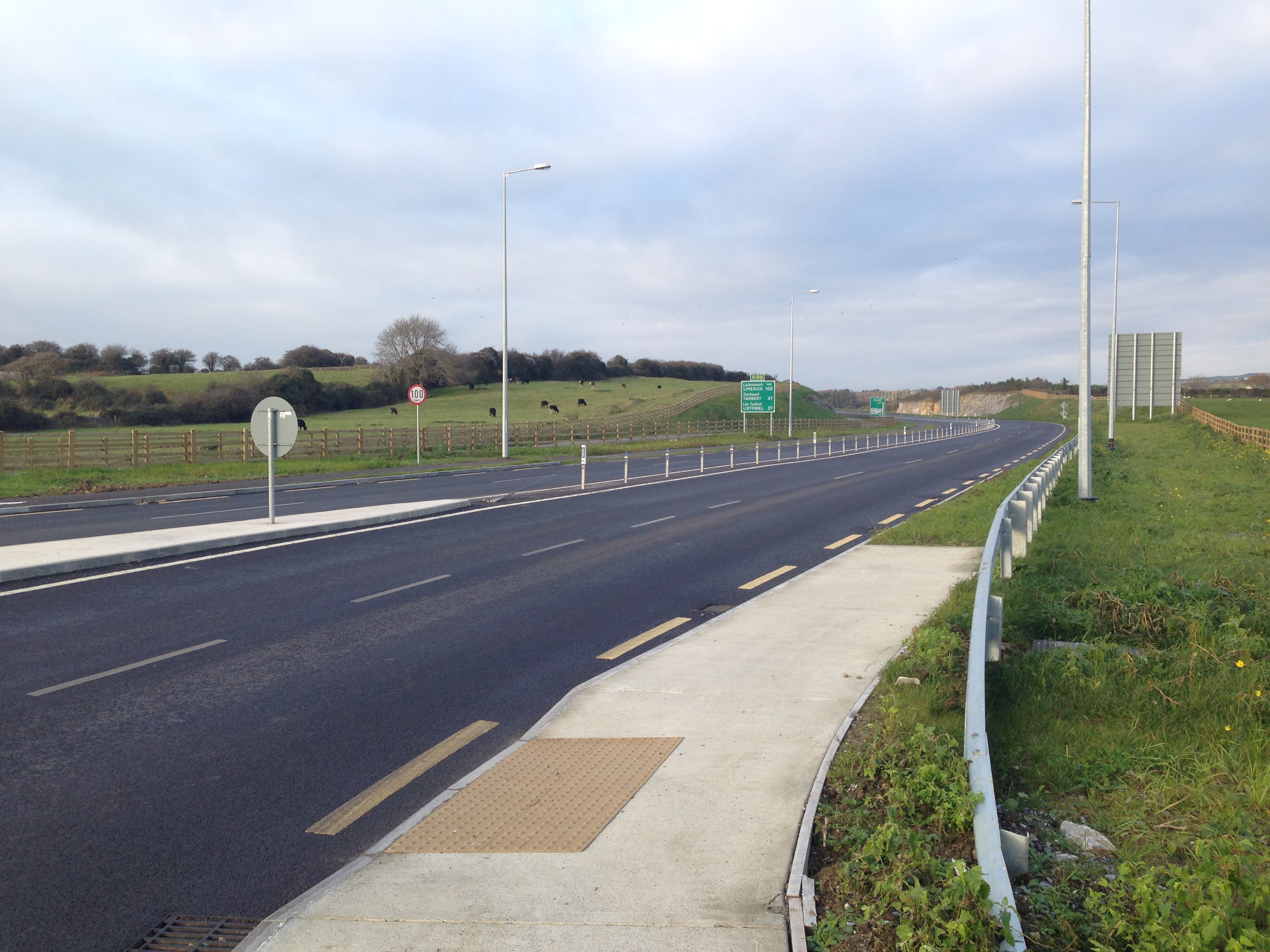
- N69 Tralee Bypass

Route information
- Length: 97.476 km (60.569 mi)

Location
- Country: Ireland
- Primary destinations: (bypassed routes in italics): County Limerick; Limerick City; Mungret; Clarina; Kildimo; Kilcornan; Askeaton; Foynes; Loghill; Glin; County Kerry; Tarbert (N67); Listowel; Tralee – terminates at Ballingowan on the N22/N69 Tralee Bypass

Highway system
- Roads in Ireland; Motorways; Primary; Secondary; Regional

The N69 road is a national secondary road in Ireland. It runs from Limerick to Tralee and passes through Mungret, Clarina, Kildimo, Askeaton (bypassed), Foynes, Loghill, Glin, Tarbert, and Listowel.

== Upgrades ==
The N22/N69 Tralee Bypass opened on 16 August 2013. Four kilometres of dual carriageway were added to the N69, the first such section to be included in this route. The N69 now terminates at the Ballingowan Roundabout on the N22/N69 Tralee Bypass.

In August 2024, the N69 Listowel Bypass opened. It is a six kilometre single carriageway around the north and west of the town.

== Route ==
The N69 starts in Limerick on the N18 West Limerick Bypass, which was opened in 2010. It then passes through the villages of Mungret, Clarina, Ferrybridge and Kildimo. This section of N69 is the busiest with average traffic volumes of up to 8,000 daily. It proceeds to Askeaton, which has been bypassed since 1990. It then passes through the port of Foynes and the villages of Loghill and Glin before crossing into County Kerry. In Tarbert, it intersects with the N67 before continuing on to Listowel, which is bypassed by a six kilometre single carriageway. The road then goes south, by the village of Kilflynn before reaching the Forge Cross Roundabout in Tralee. The N69 terminates at Ballingown Roundabout on the Tralee Bypass, which opened in 2013.
