= Mahoonagh =

Village in County Limerick, Ireland

Mahoonagh Caisleán Maí Tamhnach Castlemahon
- Village
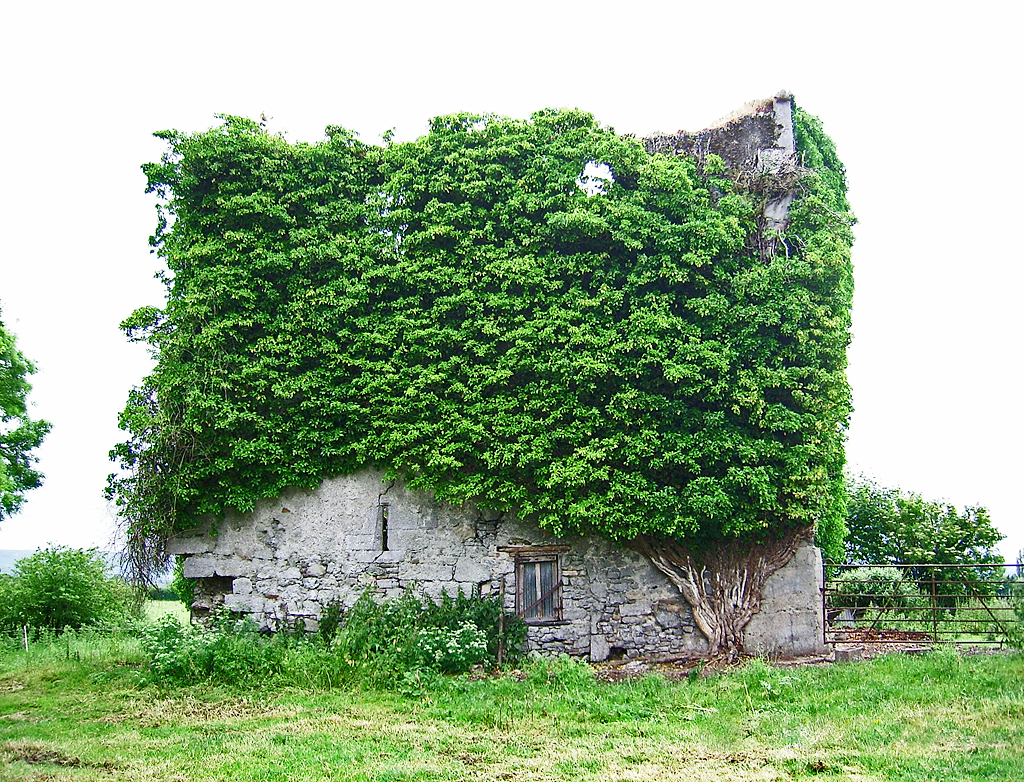
- Ruin of Castle Mahon, just outside Mahoonagh village

- Location in Ireland
- Coordinates: 52°25′51″N 9°00′36″W
- Country: Ireland
- Province: Munster
- County: County Limerick
- Time zone: UTC+0 (WET)
  - Summer (DST): UTC-1 (IST (WEST))
- Irish Grid Reference: R310300

Mahoonagh or Castlemahon (Irish: Caisleán Maí Tamhnach) is a village and civil parish in County Limerick, Ireland. The village lies four kilometres south east of the town of Newcastle West.

There are two villages within the civil parish of Mahoonagh, namely Mahoonagh and Feohanagh (Feothanach) villages. Mahoonagh village is the official name and it is known locally as Castlemahon (Caisleán Uí Mhathúna) village.

There is one main street in Castlemahon and one main housing estate known as Churchview. There is a parish hall, a primary National School, a Roman Catholic church, two shops, one pub, one car garage and a plant hire company within the village.

== Location ==
From Newcastle West proceed out the 'Bruff line' road (towards Kilmallock) and after 1.5 miles (2.4 km) take the first right at the cross roads towards Kilmeedy. Mahoonagh/Castlemahon village is situated on the east bank of the River Deel.

Feohanagh village is situated approximately eight kilometres further away, on the R522 on the road between Newcastle West and Dromcollogher.

== Transportation ==
=== Road ===
The Killarney/Tralee bus route passes through Newcastle West. The county's regional/national bus hub is located in Limerick City's Colbert Station train station. The bus hub has connections to various cities and towns throughout Ireland.

=== Rail ===
The nearest passenger rail is Charleville, County Cork. This lies on the Cork-Dublin line. The Limerick-Dublin line via Limerick Junction County Tipperary is also accessible.

=== Air ===
No commercial airports are situated in County Limerick and the parish's needs are serviced from Shannon Airport, N19 road in County Clare, Kerry Airport Farranfore, N23 road County Kerry and Cork Airport, N27 road County Cork, all are within an hour's drive.

== Education ==
There is one primary school within the village known as Mahoonagh National School and it is situated on the site of the Old Saint Nicholas Church.

== History ==
=== Name and early history ===
The present day name of Mahoonagh comes from the Irish 'Maigh Tamhnach', which means 'the plain of the tree stumps' or 'the plain of the clearings'. The village of Mahoonagh is more commonly known as Castlemahon village, although Mainchín Seoighe tells us that the origin of this place name is unclear, there being neither parish nor townland of that name.

In the Civil Survey of 1654–56 the spelling is Mahownagh, Mahoonagh (or Castlemahon as it is locally known), at that time, the parish was in the Glenquin Division of the barony of Upper Connello. There is no exact known date for the founding of the parish. In the sixteenth century, Mahoonagh was divided up into three parts called Trean Tawnaghe, Treanmeane and Treanfaltaghe.

The ruins of a large square tower about 30 feet (9.1 m) high, exist near Castlemahon and gives the name to the village. Near it is a circular building, with a high conical roof of stone. It was a fortress erected about 1490 by the Fitzgeralds.

Cormac MacCarthaigh became the King of Munster in 1123 when his brother Tadhg died. According to Mainchín Seoighe, Cormac was known as Cormac Muighe Thamhnach because he had his residence in Mahoonagh. Cormac led an expedition against the O'Connor's of Connacht. However, he was displaced as king in 1127 and was killed in 1138 in his house in Maigh Thamhnach by the O'Briens. Previously, it was recorded that Cellachan, the King of Cashel was killed at Mahoonagh in 954.

Emigrants to North America from Mahoonagh include Michael Scanlon, the "Fenian Poet," Thomas Scanlan, Mayor of Houston, Texas in the 1800s, William Fleming, Grandfather of Harry Raymond Fleming, Canadian Member of Parliament and Great Great Grandfather of Michael P. Fleming, Elected Harris County Attorney (Houston, Texas).

=== Castles ===
Mahoonagh Castle was built by the FitzGeralds at the end of the 12th or the beginning of the 13th century. In later years the castle was owned by the Fitzgibbons. The English occupied it but in 1598 another Fitzgibbon descendant of those who once owned the castle – attacked it and gained possession of it. There is an interesting story of how this Thomas Fitzgibbon-Macgibbon succeeded in taking over the Castle. He had a servant named Casey. Nobody Knows how Casey came to be in the Castle with the English, but on Shrove Tuesday morning he rose early, he Climbed to the top of the tower unobserved by the inmates and whistled. This was a signal to Fitzgibbon and the Irish to get ready. He came down, roused up the porter, Thomas Everard and conned him into letting him out. Escott, who held the castle, Vosias Walker, Daniel Jennings the Local minister, and others to the number of forty, were it is alleged, stripped naked by Macgibbon. Four of them were hanged at the Windmill of Meane near Kilbolane Castle while the rest were allowed to retire in safety. The other prisoners were ordered to march to North Cork. As there were more captives than the Irish, Fitzgibbon decided to leave some of them to be hanged along the way. The English got angry at this and Fitzgibbon was forced to set all the prisoners free.

At Ballynoe are the remains of an old Castle was built by the Knights Templer. The ivy clad ruins of Clonelty Church can still be traced beside the old castle.

The principal seats were at Mayne, the residence of Bryan Sheehy, and Ballinakillmore of Godfrey Massey. The living was a rectory and vicarage of the Roman Catholic Diocese of Limerick and in the patronage of the Earl of Devon. Tithes amounted to £500 and there was a Glebe of 13 acres (53,000 m^{2}).

=== Mills ===
There were several water mills on the River Deel, from flax to wheat, none survive today. It was suspected that they were built similar to local houses at that time and floods from the river and normal weather destroyed the buildings after they were not maintained.

=== History of the creamery ===
Castlemahon Co-operative Dairy Society was formed in 1890. The Castlemahon area was campaigned for share capital and the erection of the creamery commenced in 1891. The contractors were the Naughton's. The building was completed and in order for the start of 1892 milk season. The committee and the officers that were elected include, chairman George L Sheehy, and manager Tom Beary, of Mitchelstown. Mr. Beary resigned in 1893 and was replaced by two local men of Castlemahon. Joseph Liston and James Phelan, were temporary managers until Denis Hegarty, of Roscarberry took over the creamery.

=== Castlemahon co-operative ===
In 1920 poultry processing commenced in the creamery and consisted of the gathering of live fowl for both the home market and for export. The business became the leading poultry provider in Ireland in 1960, after the amalgamation of the milk business, of the co – operative with Golden Vale in the early 1970s. Golden Vale in the mid-1980s wound up their business on the site and diverted the Farmers to deliver their Milk to nearby Newcastle West. The Castlemahon site was a great social meeting place for the local gossip in the parish for the local farmers as they were always plenty of parking for the long gossip without affecting the delivery of milk. An old shop (now demolished) across the road served newspapers and other needs for the farmers. The poultry business continued as a separate co – operative and embarked on an ambitious growth programme through business acquisitions. The workforce at Castlemahon has proved to be highly flexible as is required in the fresh food business. They supply quality poultry to Ireland's leading retailers and caterers.

A new company was formed in October 1984 when O'Kane Poultry of Ballymena purchased the processing plant from the liquidator of the Co-operative. Castlemahon Foods brought the Golden Vale site and built a cooking plant on its location. As the range of product produced grew, the skill base of the company expanded to cater for market requirements. Over the years, Castlemahon Foods continued to expand the overall chicken market by providing an alternative chicken meal from chicken portions to the roast chicken and turkey portions. Castlemahon foods continued to upgrade it equipment and improved their process over the years until it went into receivership in October 2006 and wound up in November 2006 losing up to 300 jobs.

== Sports ==
=== GAA ===
The main centre for sports within the parish is the Feohanagh-Castlemahon GAA Club, which has a playing field in Coolyroe. For hurling the parish is represented by Feohanagh and in Gaelic football it is Castlemahon who represent the parish. There are also handball courts available in Coolyroe. Hurling is the main sport in Castlemahon. Hurling players from this club include members of the Quaid family, including Tommy Quaid and Joe Quaid.

=== Other sports ===
There is a golf society with the parish, named the Castlemahon Golf Society. Other sports centres are located in nearby Newcastle West, with soccer and other indoor sports in the Demesne, Newcastle West. A rugby club is on the Killarney road, (N21) Newcastle West.

== Employment ==
=== Farming ===
Mahoonagh is part of the fertile Golden Vale which is used extensively for farming. For most of Mahoonagh history, farming was the main employment. It comprises 12,262 statute acres, being chiefly pasture and meadow, constituting several large and small dairy farms, around the parish. Until late 2006, with the closure of Castlemahon Foods, poultry farming was another income for the local farmers in the area.

The Newcastle West Agricultural Show take place within the parish, at Ballynoe on farm of Terence Leonard's farm. It was previously sited within the Castle Demesne in Newcastle West.

=== Ballinvullin Industrial Estate ===
As of 2007/2008, there was an industrial estate under construction in the townland of Ballinvullen (west of the village towards the Cork road (R522) which already has a mill nearby built by Castlemahon Foods near Lacey's Cross.

=== Former employers ===
Employers for the parish previously included Castlemahon Foods (known locally as the Creamery) which was located across the river on the west bank from the main village on the road to Lacey's Cross in the townland of Ballinvullen. The factory closed down and went into receivership in October 2006. Up to 300 processing jobs were lost when the owners of Castlemahon, the O'Kane Group, applied to the High Court to have company wound up. The closure also left 58 growers and 20 chicken/turkey breeders without an outlet for their produce.

The soil rests on a substratum of limestone, and there were limestone quarries at Shauragh and near the village.

== Religion ==
There are two Catholic Churches within the parish, St. John the Baptist (Castlemahon) and St. Mary's (Feohanagh).

== Siberian tigers ==
Several reports on RTÉ News and in national and local newspapers, stated that two Siberian tigers settled down in Castlemahon in November 1990. Stafford and Kathleen Tailor of Mahoonagh/Castlemahon bought a Christmas present of two Siberian tigers for their daughter Andrea. The names of the tigers were Nova and Batack. The animals were delivered by Chipperfield Circus to their new home, which was built to the specified standards. The large reinforced double cage where they were kept was in specification beforehand for the safe keeping of these animals. This event was mentioned in a debate in the Dáil Éireann on 4 March 1992, but Deputy Michael Noonan misquoted the date of arrival of the tigers.

== Bordering parishes ==
- Newcastle West to the northwest,
- Knockaderry / Cloncagh to the northeast & east,
- Feenagh / Kilmeedy to the southeast,
- Dromcollogher / Broadford to the south,
- Killeedy / Ashford / Raheenagh to the southwest,
- Monagea to the west.

== Townlands ==
| English Name | Irish Name | Meaning |
|---|---|---|
| Ahawik | Áth an Mhoilc | The ford of the throng |
| Appletown | Drom Cromáin | Ridge of the bending feature |
| Balliniska | Baile an Uisce | The town of the water |
| Ballinvullen | Baile an Mhuilaigh | The town of the summit |
| Ballydonnell | Baile Uí Dhónhaill | The town of Ó Dónaill |
| Ballydoorty | Baile Uí Dhúrtaigh | The town of Ó Dúrtaigh |
| Ballinakillbeg | Baile na Coille Beag | The town of the small woods |
| Ballinakillmore | Baile na Coille Mór | The town of the big woods |
| Ballygullen | Baile Uí Ghoillín | The town of Ó Goillín |
| Ballynoe | An Baile Nua | The new town |
| Ballyregan | Baile Uí Riagáin | The town of Ó Riagáin |
| Cloonmore | An Chluain Mhór | The big meadow |
| Clooncooravane North | Cluain Cúrabháin | The meadow of the round white hollow |
| Clooncooravane South | as above | as above |
| Clounsherrick | Cluain Séaraic | The meadow of Séaraic |
| Cooliska | An Chúil Loiscthe | The burnt corner |
| Coolygorman | Cúil Uí Ghormain | O’Gorman's corner |
| Coolyroe | Cúil an Rua | The corner of the red feature |
| Curragh | An Currach | The wet land |
| Danganbeg | An Daingean Beag | The small fort |
| Fawnlehane | Fán Liatháin | The slope of Liathán |
| Farran | Fearann | Land |
| Feohanagh | An Fheothanach | The place of thistles |
| Garbally East | An Gearrbhaile | The short town |
| Garrane | An Garrán | The grove |
| Garryduff | An Garraí Dubh | The black garden |
| Gortmore | An Gort Mór | The big field |
| Gortskagh | Gort Scátha | The field of briars |
| Iniskeen | Inis Caoin | Pleasant island |
| Kilready | Cill an Riadaigh | The church of An Riadach |
| Mahoonagh Beg | Maigh Thamhnach Beag | Small plain of clearings |
| Mahoonagh More | Maigh Thamhnach Mór | Large plain of clearings |
| Mayne | Méin | Meaning uncertain |
| Moanroe Beg | An Mhóin Rua | The red bogland |
| Moanlena | Móin Léana | Bogland of wet meadows |
| Rathpalatine | Ráth na bPalaitíneach | The rath of the Palatines |
| Shanrath | An tSeanráth | The old rath |
| Walshestown | Baile na Bhreatnaigh | The town of the Welshman |

== See also ==
- List of towns and villages in Ireland
