= Jim Quaid =

Irish hurler (1932–2021)

Personal information
- Native name: Séamus Mac Uaid (Irish)
- Nickname: Carpenter
- Born: 1932 Castlemahon, County Limerick, Ireland
- Died: 25 March 2021 (aged 89) Dooradoyle, Limerick, Ireland
- Height: 5 ft 10 in (178 cm)

Sport
- Sport: Hurling
- Position: Midfielder
Club
- Years: Club
- Feohanagh-Castlemahon
Club titles
- Limerick titles: 0
Inter-county
- Years: County
- Limerick
Inter-county titles
- Munster titles: 1
- All-Irelands: 0
- NHL: 0

James Quaid (1932 – 25 March 2021) was an Irish hurler who played at club level with Feohanagh-Castlemahon and at inter-county level with Limerick.

== Career ==
From the Feohanagh-Castlemahon club, Quaid first came to prominence on the inter-county scene alongside his twin brother Jack on the Limerick junior team that overcame London to win the 1955 All-Ireland Junior Championship. Promotion to the senior side followed, with both Quaid brothers heavily involved as Limerick surprised Clare to win the 1955 Munster Championship. The team, labelled "Mackey's Greyhounds" after their trainer Mick Mackey, were subsequently beaten by eventual champions Wexford in the All-Ireland semi-final. Quaid continued playing for Limerick until the 1960s.

== Personal life ==
The Quaid surname has been synonymous with Limerick hurling for nearly 70 years. A cousin, Séamus Quaid, was a contemporary of the Quaid twins and lined out with Limerick before winning the 1960 All-Ireland Championship with Wexford. Jim Quaid's nephew, Tommy, was also a Munster Championship-winner as goalkeeper with the Limerick team between 1976 and 1993. His son, Joe Quaid, immediately took over as goalkeeper and also won Munster Championship medals in a decade-long career. Jim Quaid's grandnephew, Nickie Quaid, continues the family goalkeeping tradition with Limerick and as of July 2026 has won six All-Ireland Championships.

Jim Quaid died at University Hospital Limerick on 25 March 2021, aged 89.

== Honours ==
Limerick

- Munster Senior Hurling Championship: 1955
- All-Ireland Junior Hurling Championship: 1954
- Munster Junior Hurling Championship: 1954
