= Glenquin =

Barony in County Limerick, Ireland

Glenquin Gleann an Choim (Irish)
- Barony
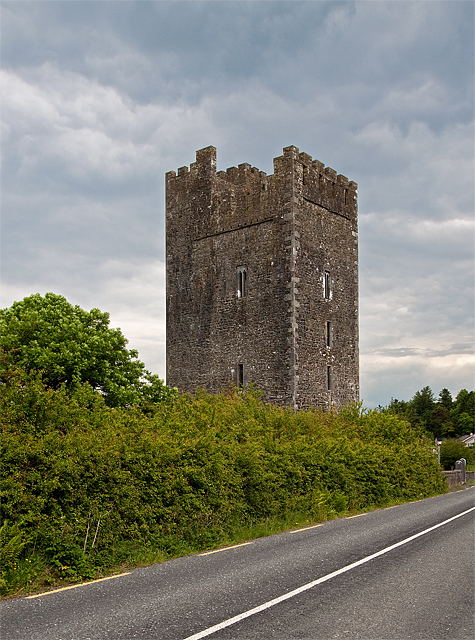
- Glenquin Castle near Killeedy

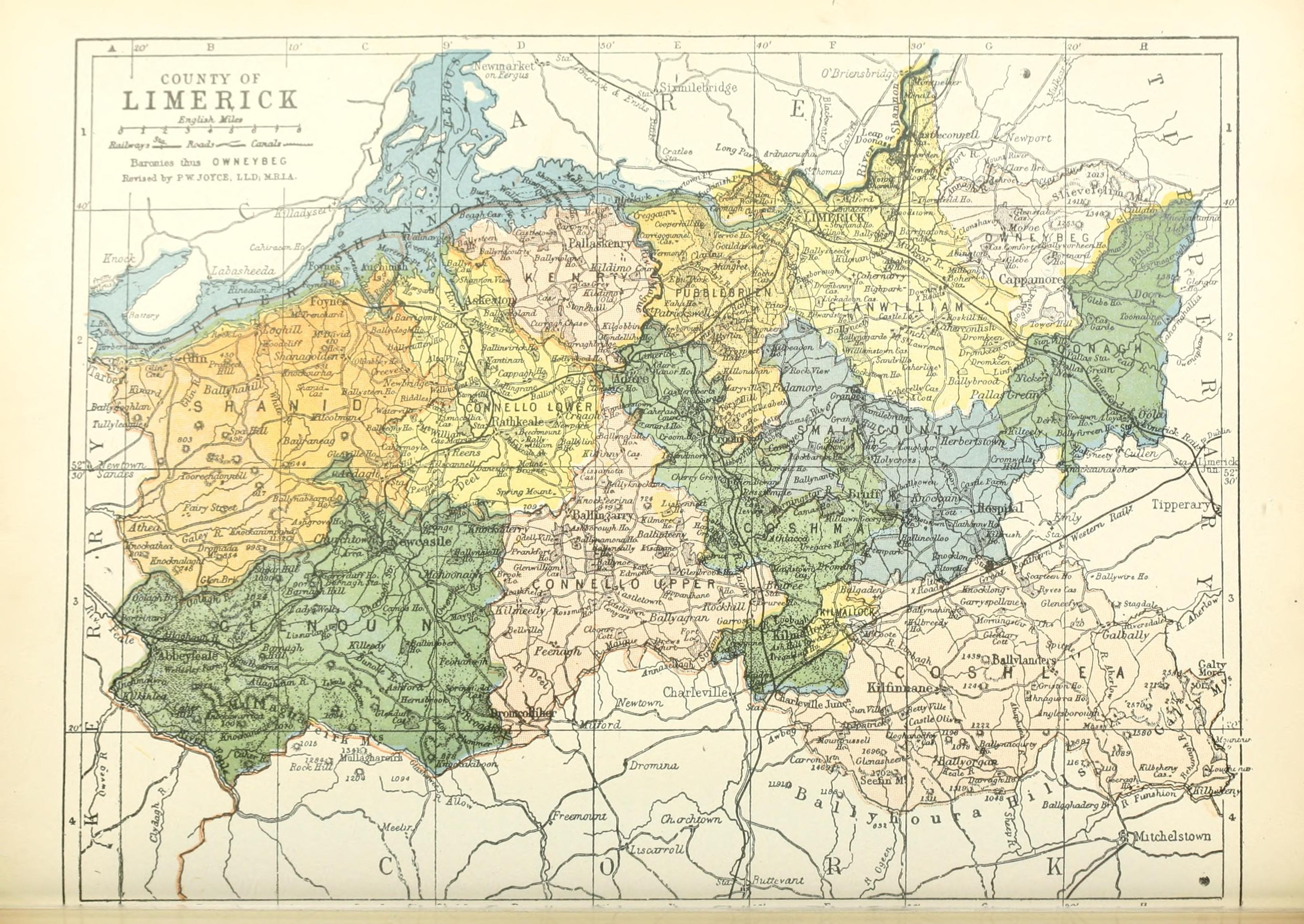
- Barony map of County Limerick, 1900; Glenquin is in the southwest, coloured green.

- Location within Ireland
- Coordinates: 52°24′N 9°07′W
- Sovereign state: Ireland
- Province: Munster
- County: Limerick

Area
  - Total: 390.1 km^{2} (150.6 sq mi)

Glenquin (Irish: Gleann an Choim) is a historical barony in southwest County Limerick, Ireland.

Baronies were mainly cadastral rather than administrative units. They acquired modest local taxation and spending functions in the 19th century before being superseded by the Local Government (Ireland) Act 1898.

== History ==
Glenquin was anciently part of the Uí Fidgenti (Uí Chonaill Gabra). Later, the Ó hAilgheanáin (O'Hallinans) ruled the area and built Glenquin Castle (Irish: Gleann an Choim, "valley of the hollow") before being pushed out by the O'Briens. It was formerly called Kyllyde hy Connil ("Killeedy of the O'Connells").

Glenquin barony, named for the castle, was created in 1841; prior to that, it was part of Connello Upper.

== Geography ==
Glenquin is in the southwest of the county, bordering County Kerry to its west; much of the border is formed by the River Feale. Glenquin is also bound by the Oolagh River to the north and the Mullaghareirk Mountains to the south, where it borders County Cork. It also contains the Allaghaun River and River Deel.

== List of settlements ==
Settlements within the historical barony of Glenquin include:

- Abbeyfeale
- Broadford
- Feohanagh
- Knockaderry
- Mahoonagh
- Mountcollins
- Newcastlewest
- Templeglantine
- Toornafulla
