= John Flanagan (Limerick hurler) =

Irish hurler

Personal information
- Native name: Seán Ó Flanagáin (Irish)
- Born: 9 January 1956 (age 70) Feohanagh, County Limerick
- Occupation: Farmer
- Height: 5 ft 9 in (175 cm)

Sport
- Sport: Hurling
- Position: Centre-forward
Club
- Years: Club
- 1970s-1990s: Feohanagh-Castlemahon
Inter-county
- Years: County
- 1970s-1980s: Limerick
Inter-county titles
- Munster titles: 2
- All-Irelands: 0
- NHL: 2
- All Stars: 0

John Flanagan (born 9 January 1956 in Feohanagh, County Limerick) is a retired Irish sportsperson. He played hurling with his local club Feohanagh-Castlemahon and was a member of the Limerick senior inter-county team in the 1970s and 1980s.
