= Dromcollogher-Broadford =

Catholic parish in County Limerick, Ireland

Dromcollogher-Broadford Drom Collachair-Béal an Átha
- Parish
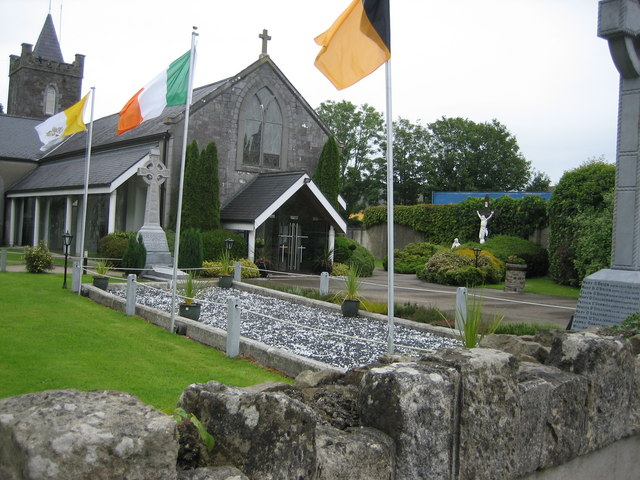
- St Bartholomew's in Dromcollogher, together with Our Lady of the Snows in Broadford, is one of two Catholic churches within the parish

- Location in Ireland
- Coordinates: 52°20′42″N 8°58′26″W
- Country: Ireland
- County: County Limerick
- Time zone: UTC+0 (WET)
  - Summer (DST): UTC-1 (IST (WEST))
- Irish Grid Reference: R350220

Dromcolliher-Broadford is an ecclesiastical parish in County Limerick, near the border with north County Cork, in Ireland. The Catholic parish, which is within the Diocese of Limerick, spans the villages of Dromcolliher and Broadford. The local Gaelic Athletic Association club, Dromcollogher/Broadford GAA, draws its players from the area.

== Churches ==
Churches within Dromcolliher-Broadford parish include St Bartholomew's church in Dromcollogher (built in 1824) and Our Lady of the Snows church in Broadford (built in 1844). An earlier medieval church, now in ruins, was known as Killaliathan Church (or Killagholehane Church).

== Geography ==
=== Villages ===
The village of Dromcolliher (Irish: Drom Collachair) lies towards the west of County Limerick. Part of the parish of Dromcollogher-Broadford, it is located close to the boundary of north County Cork on the R522 road.

The village of Broadford (Irish: Béal an Átha, meaning 'mouth of the ford') is also in the west of County Limerick. As of the 2006 census, the Broadford electoral district had a population of 891. Broadford village, first recorded by cartographers in 1837, was previously known as "Killaliathan" or "Killagholehane". This name derives from the medieval Killaliathan Church - now in ruins.

=== Townlands ===
Townlands within the area include:

| English name | Irish name | Meaning |
|---|---|---|
| Ballinlongig | Baile an Longaigh | The town of An Longach |
| Ballyfirreen | Baile Phirín | The town of Pirín |
| Ballymongaun | Baile Uí Mhongáin | The town of Ó Mongán |
| Banemore | An Bán Mór | The big (tract of) lea ground |
| Barnagarrane | Barr na nGarrán | The high ground of the groves |
| Boola | An Bhuaile | The booley |
| Broadford | Béal an Átha | The mouth of the ford |
| Carroward East Side | An Cheathrú Árd | The high quarterland |
| Carroward West Side | An Cheathrú Thiar | The high quarterland |
| Coolaboy | Cúil Buí | Yellow corners |
| Coolaleen | Cúil an Lín | The corner of the flax |
| Coolnaknockane | Cúil na gCnocán | The corner of the hillocks |
| Dromcollogher | Drom Collachair | Ridge of the Hazelwood |
| Farrihy | An Fhairche | The territory |
| Gardenfield East | Ghairdínpáirc Thoir; | |
| Gardenfield South | Ghairdínpáirc Theas | |
| Gardenfield West | hairdínpáirc Thiar | |
| Gorteen | An Goirtín | The small field |
| Kells | Na Cealla | The churches |
| Killeen | An Cillín | The small church |
| Knockacraig | Cnoc an Chraobhaigh | The hill of An Craobhach |
| Knockgloss | An Cnoc Glas | The green hill |
| Knocktoosh | Cnoc Túis | Church of Toosh |
| Lacka Lower | An Leaca | The Lower hillside |
| Lacca Upper | An Leaca | The Upper Hillside |
| Lisnafulla | Lios na Fola | The enclosure of the blood |
| Mondellihy | Móin Deilithe | Meaning uncertain |
| Mount Plummer | Cill Aidhleach | The church of Aidhleach |
| Sheshiv | Seiseamh | Sixth part |
| Springfield | Gort na Tiobraide | The field of the well |
| Tullaha | Na Tulacha | The hillocks |
| Tulligmacthomas | Tulaigh Mhic Thomáis | The hillock of Mac Thomáis |
| Woodfield | Ros na Réileán | The high place of the level tracts |
