= Connello Lower =

Barony in County Limerick, Ireland

Connello Lower Conallaigh Íochtaracha (Irish)
- Barony
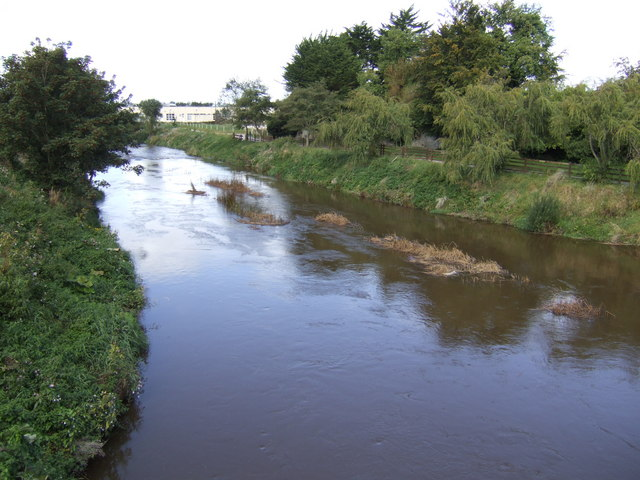
- The River Deel near Rathkeale

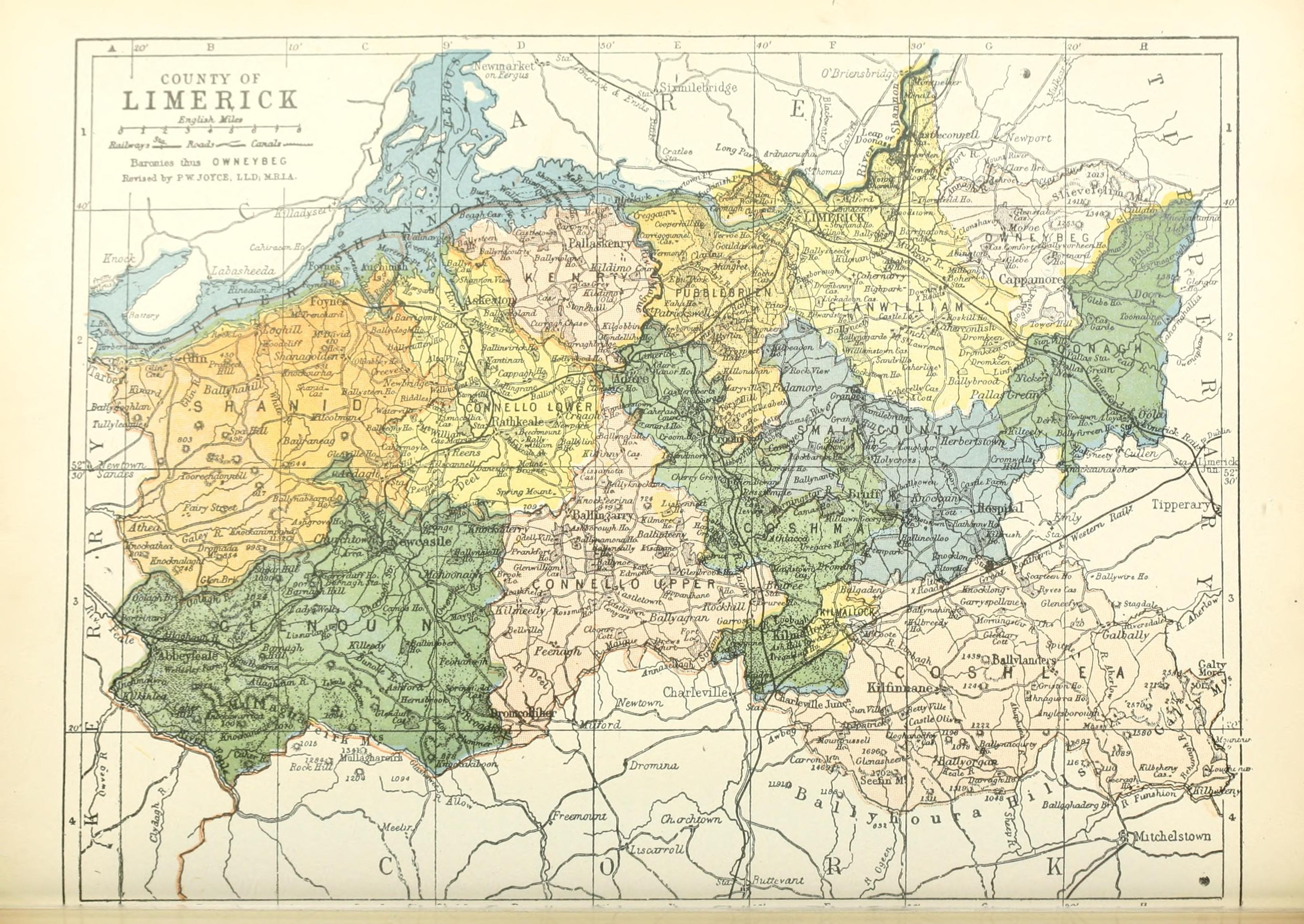
- Barony map of County Limerick, 1900; Connello Lower is in the northwest, coloured yellow.

- Location within Ireland
- Coordinates: 52°32′N 8°58′W
- Sovereign state: Ireland
- Province: Munster
- County: Limerick

Area
  - Total: 193.6 km^{2} (74.7 sq mi)

Connello Lower (Irish: Conallaigh Íochtaracha; sometimes Lower Connello, and occasionally spelled Conello) is a historical barony in northwest County Limerick, Ireland.

Baronies were mainly cadastral rather than administrative units. They acquired modest local taxation and spending functions in the 19th century before being superseded by the Local Government (Ireland) Act 1898.

== History ==
Originally western Limerick was a single vast barony known as Connello. It was divided into Lower (northern) and Upper (southern) halves some time before 1821, and 1841 the western part of Connello Lower was made a separate barony, Shanid, while the western half of Connello Upper became the barony of Glenquin.

The Connello Lower region was the anciently the possession of the Uí Chonaill Gabra, part of the Uí Fidgeinti; the name refers to an ancestor, Conall Gabra, "Conall of the White Horse." The Connalla was the name of the Eóganachta cantred. The Ó Coileáin (Collins or Cullane) were lords of Connello until they moved to County Cork in the 13th century.

== Geography ==
Connello Lower is in the northwest of the county, south of the Shannon Estuary and incorporating the lower part of the River Deel's basin.

== List of settlements ==
Settlements within the historical barony of Connello Lower include:

- Askeaton
- Croagh
- Rathkeale
