= R515 road (Ireland) =

Road in Ireland

R515 road
- Bóthar R515
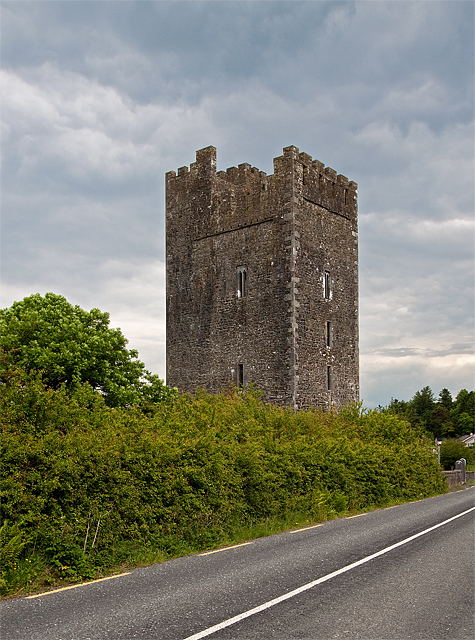
- R515 passing Glenquin Castle

Route information
- Length: 84 km (52 mi)

Location
- Country: Ireland
- Primary destinations: County Limerick; Leaves the N21; Ballagh; Ashford; (R579); Broadford; Dromcolliher - (R522); (R519); County Cork; Milford; Newtownshandrum - (R578); Charleville - (N20); Crosses the Dublin-Cork railway line; County Limerick; Kilmallock - (R512); Crosses the Dublin-Cork railway line twice; Elton; Knocklong - (R513); County Tipperary; (R516); Emly; Crosses the Dublin-Cork railway line; Lattin; (R581); Tipperary Town - terminates at a junction with the N24

Highway system
- Roads in Ireland; Motorways; Primary; Secondary; Regional

The R515 road is a regional road in Ireland which runs from 6 km (3.7 mi) east of Abbeyfeale in County Limerick to the N24 national secondary road in Tipperary Town. En route it passes through Dromcolliher, Charleville and Kilmallock. The road is 84 km (52 mi) long.

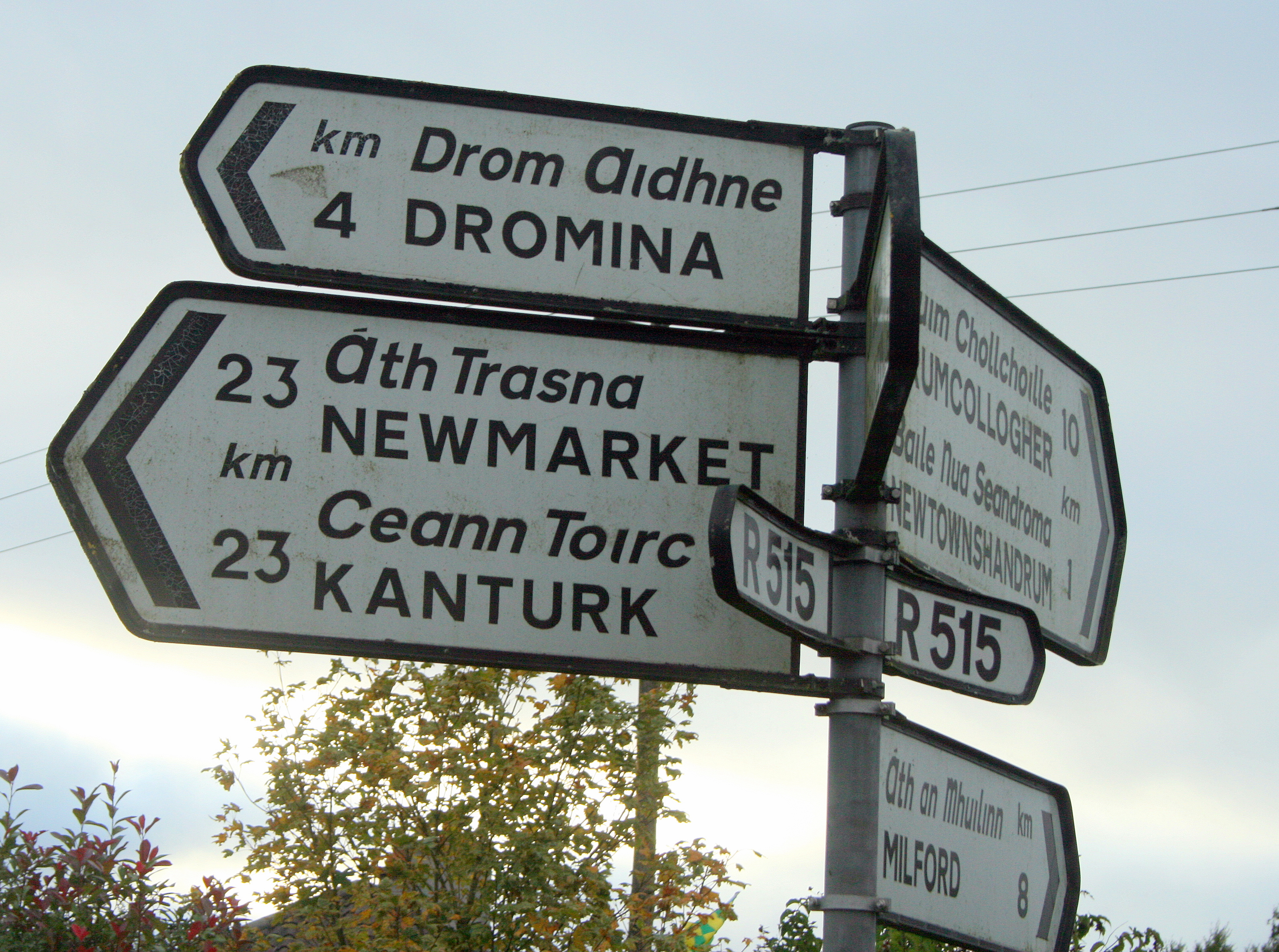
R515 near Newtownshandrum at R578 junction

== See also ==
- Roads in Ireland
- National primary road
- National secondary road
