= Paudie Fitzmaurice =

Irish hurler

Personal information
- Native name: Pádraig Mac Muiris (Irish)
- Born: Limerick, Ireland

Sport
- Sport: Hurling
- Position: Wing-Forward
Club
- Years: Club
- Killeedy GAA
Inter-county
- Years: County
- 1973–1981: Limerick
Inter-county titles
- All Stars: 1

Paudie Fitzmaurice (born 16 November 1949) is a hurler from Killeedy in County Limerick, Ireland, who featured in Limerick hurling teams of the 1970s. Fitzmaurice was part of the Limerick county hurling team which won the All-Ireland in 1973,) as well as in the 1974, 1980 and 1981 teams. He was captain when Limerick won the 1981 Munster Senior Hurling Championship Final. He is a two-time National League winner, and finished as top scorer when captaining Maynooth College to victory in the Fitzgibbon Cup in 1974. His achievements as a player were recognised in 1984 when Fitzmaurice received an All-Star award. Fitzmaurice continued to play competitive hurling for his native Killeedy until 1996.

Fitzmaurice was named manager of the Sligo hurling team in January 2003. but resigned after harsh criticism in May of that year.

He trained for the priesthood in St. Patrick's College, Maynooth, as did his brother Fr. Willie Fitzmaurice, who also played hurling for Limerick.

== Teaching ==
Fitzmaurice attended Trinity College Dublin, and is a former member of staff at St. Munchin's College, where he taught mathematics, applied mathematics and physics. He currently teaches mathematics and hurling at Castletroy College in Limerick. Before that, he served as institute chaplain at Limerick Institute of Technology.

== Hurling style ==
Paudie and his brother Willie were noted for their unusual hurling technique. When striking the sliotar, the Fitzmaurice brothers did not bend their elbows.

== Notes ==
Sporting positions
Preceded by Seán Foley	Limerick Senior Hurling Captain; 1981	Succeeded by Joe McKenna
