= Jack Quaid (hurler) =

Irish hurler (1932–2021)

Personal information
- Native name: Seosamh Mac Uaid (Irish)
- Nickname: Carpenter
- Born: 1932 Castlemahon, County Limerick, Ireland
- Died: 22 February 2021 (aged 88) Dooradoyle, Limerick, Ireland
- Height: 5 ft 10 in (178 cm)

Sport
- Sport: Hurling
- Position: Left wing-back
Club
- Years: Club
- Feohanagh-Castlemahon
Club titles
- Limerick titles: 0
Inter-county
- Years: County
- Limerick
Inter-county titles
- Munster titles: 1
- All-Irelands: 0
- NHL: 0

John Quaid (1932 – 22 February 2021) was an Irish hurler who played at club level with Feohanagh-Castlemahon, at inter-county level with Limerick and at inter-provincial level with Munster.

== Career ==
From the Feohanagh-Castlemahon club, Quaid first came to prominence on the inter-county scene alongside his twin brother Jim on the Limerick junior team that overcame London to win the 1955 All-Ireland Junior Championship. Promotion to the senior side followed, with both Quaid brothers heavily involved as Limerick surprised Clare to win the 1955 Munster Championship. The team, labelled "Mackey's Greyhounds" after their trainer Mick Mackey, were subsequently beaten by eventual champions Wexford in the All-Ireland semi-final. Quaid continued playing for Limerick until the 1960s, by which time he had also won three Railway Cup medals with Munster.

== Personal life and death ==
The Quaid surname has been synonymous with Limerick hurling for nearly 70 years. A cousin, Séamus Quaid, was a contemporary of the Quaid twins and lined out with Limerick before winning the 1960 All-Ireland Championship with Wexford. Jack Quaid's son, Tommy, was also a Munster Championship-winner as goalkeeper with the Limerick team between 1976 and 1993. His nephew, Joe Quaid, immediately took over as goalkeeper and also won Munster Championship medals in a decade-long career. Jack Quaid's grandson, Nickie Quaid, has continued the family goalkeeping tradition with Limerick and has won two All-Ireland Championships.

Jack Quaid died at University Hospital Limerick on 22 February 2021.

== Honours ==
Limerick

- Munster Senior Hurling Championship: 1955
- All-Ireland Junior Hurling Championship: 1954
- Munster Junior Hurling Championship: 1954

Munster

- Railway Cup: 1957, 1959, 1960
