= Itha =

Itha is an alternate spelling of the Gaelic feminine given name Íte or Íde.

It may refer to:

- Saint Íte of Killeedy
- 918 Itha
