= Kilmeedy =

Village in County Limerick, Ireland

Kilmeedy Cill Míde
- Village
- Location in Ireland
- Coordinates: 52°24′58″N 8°54′58″W
- Country: Ireland
- Province: Munster
- County: County Limerick
- Time zone: UTC+0 (WET)
  - Summer (DST): UTC-1 (IST (WEST))

Kilmeedy (Irish: Cill Míde) is a village in County Limerick, Ireland, in the parish of Feenagh-Kilmeedy.

In Irish, Kilmeedy translates as Cill m'Íde, or "Church of my Ita." This refers to Saint Ita who founded a church in the area before moving to another parish in the Limerick area, Killeedy, also named after the saint. Kilmeedy was a medieval settlement, and Feenagh/Kilmeedy became a parish in 1851.

Kilmeedy village is located on the R519 from Ballingarry to Dromcolliher at a crossroads. Five roads radiate from the village. The population of the parish is about 900. According to 1911 Census records for Kilmeedy, the population of the village alone at the time was 274.

There is one supposed holy well in Kilmeedy's surrounding townlands called St. Brigid's Well. A little to the north of the village there is situated a mass rock which was used as a site for illegal Catholic mass services during the time of the Penal Laws. It is still used for outdoor masses to this day on some ceremonial occasions.

The village hosts an annual vintage rally towards the later summer months showcasing many vintage vehicles and many old fashioned trades.

The local GAA club is Feenagh-Kilmeedy and the club have one Limerick Senior Hurling Championship title, won in 1963.

== See also ==
- List of towns and villages in Ireland
