= Kildorrery =

Village in County Cork, Ireland

Kildorrery Cill Dairbhre
- Village
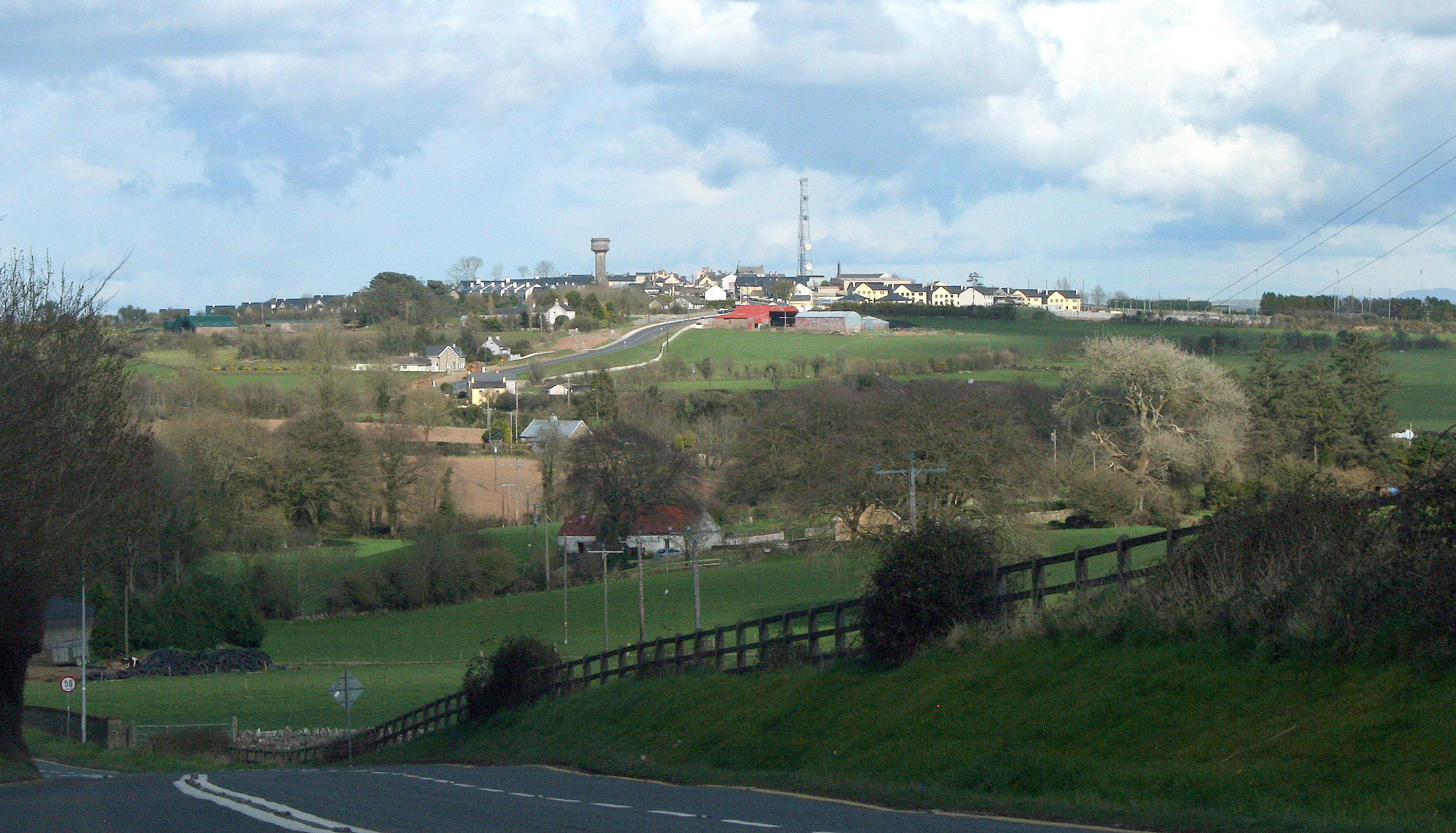
- Kildorrery lies on the N73 road in County Cork

- Location in Ireland
- Coordinates: 52°14′46″N 08°25′37″W
- Country: Ireland
- Province: Munster
- County: County Cork

Population (2016)
  - Total: 357
- Time zone: UTC+0 (WET)
  - Summer (DST): UTC-1 (IST (WEST))

Kildorrery (Irish: Cill Dairbhre, meaning 'church of the oak-forest') is a village in north County Cork, Ireland. It lies at the crossroads of the N73 road from Mallow to Mitchelstown and the R512 from Kilmallock to Fermoy. The village is in a townland and civil parish of the same name. Kildorrery is part of the Cork East Dáil constituency.

The village, which sits on a hilltop plateau, overlooks the surrounding area. To the east are the Galtee Mountains and Knockmealdown Mountains, with Slievenamon in the distance. To the north the Ballyhouras – the Limerick road is flanked by two mountains, Castlegale and Carrigeenamronety Hill (Carraigín na mBróinte). To the south, across the Blackwater Valley, are the Nagle mountains.

== History ==
Evidence of ancient settlement in the area includes a number of ringfort sites in the townlands of Ballynoe and Scart. A ruined medieval church, within the village, dates to at least the 14th century.

Bowen's Court, a former 18th century country house and home to writer Elizabeth Bowen, was built in nearby Farahy.

The current Roman Catholic church, built c. 1840, is dedicated to Saint Bartholomew.

== Economy and culture ==
Agriculture, including dairy farming, provides much of the local employment. The village itself has several businesses, including a petrol station, grocery shop, fast food outlet, a bus/coach transportation service, restaurant/cafe, two pubs which present live music, several hair salons and beauticians, a bakery, sign makers/printers, a veterinarian, horticultural businesses, a haulage firm, a funeral parlour and a nursing home.

An annual festival, known as "Hillfest", takes place during the summer and is jointly run by the local community development group and by Kildorrery GAA club.

== Education ==
Kildorrery National School on Fermoy Road was constructed in the 1970s replacing the two-roomed "Old School", formerly known as Scart National School, which was originally built in 1847. Kildorrery National School was opened in 1977, an amalgamation of Ballinguyroe and Scart National Schools. Kildorrery National School is a co-educational, Catholic primary school. There are ten full time teachers, one part time teacher and four special needs assistants in the school. As of the 2022/2023 school year, there were 195 pupils enrolled. Kildorrery also has a pre-school which operates from the community hall in the church grounds.

== See also ==
- List of towns and villages in Ireland
