= Castletown, County Limerick =

Village in County Limerick, Ireland

Coordinates: 52.4237°N 8.8134°W

Castletown (Irish: Baile an Chaisleáin, meaning 'town of the castle'), also known as Castletown Conyers, is an electoral division, townland and village in County Limerick, Ireland. The townland, which had a population of 143 as of the 2011 census, is in the civil parish of Corcomohide and the historical barony of Connello Upper.

Evidence of ancient settlement in the area includes an ecclesiastical site (known locally as "the Abbey"), a motte, a castle and manor house. The entry for Castletown Conyers, in A Topographical Dictionary of Ireland (1837), associates this settlement with the Mac Einery family. Originally known as Kilmoodan, and later known as Castletown McEnery, the area became known as Castletown Conyers after the arrival of the Conyer family in the late 17th century. The Conyer family, landlords and occupiers of the estate's manor house, lived in the area until at least the late 19th century.
