= Feohanagh/Castlemahon GAA =

Gaelic games club in County Limerick, Ireland

Feohanagh – Castlemahon
- An Fheothanach – Caisleán Uí Mhathúna
- Founded: 1890
- County: Limerick
- Colours: Blue and White
- Grounds: Quaid Park, Coolyroe
- Coordinates: 52°24′44.00″N 8°58′10.00″W

Playing kits
Standard colours

Feohanagh-Castlemahon (Irish: An Fheothanach – Caisleán Uí Mhathúna) is a Gaelic Athletic Association club located in the parish of Mahoonagh, County Limerick, Ireland. It was founded in 1890. Coolyroe is the main centre for the GAA field, known as Quaid Park.

Hurling is the main sport in Feohanagh-Castlemahon (Fheothanach – Caisleán Uí Mhathúna). For hurling, Mahoonagh parish is represented by Feohanagh and Gaelic football is represented by Castlemahon.

There are also handball courts in Coolyroe.

Feohanagh/Castlemahon won the 2011 West Junior A Hurling Championship defeating Dromcollogher/Broadford in the final in Feenagh on 15 October 2011 on a scoreline of 2–10 to 0–08. In 2013, they retained their West Junior A hurling title with a win over neighbours Feenagh/Kilmeedy. However, when the two sides met again in the county final, Feenagh won by 0–14 to 0–11. In 2014 Feohanagh/Castlemahon won the County Junior Championship hurling final beating Na Piarsaigh in a replay on a scoreline of 0-20 to 0-09.

In football in 2013 they were beaten by Glin 0-08 to 0–07 in the West final, but like the hurling that year, the West runners-up won the county final as Castlemahon won on a score line of 1–08 to 1–07, securing intermediate status for 2014. They went on to defeat Drom-Inch of Tipperary and Coolmeen of Clare but were beaten in the Munster Junior Football Championship Final by Keel of Kerry by 0–14 to 0–04.

== Joint teams ==
From time to time, the club joins with Knockaderry to put forward a team known as Deel Rangers and with Killeedy as Bunoke Gaels.

== Notable players ==
Notable hurlers from the club include;

- Tommy Quaid
- Joe Quaid
- Jack Quaid
- Séamus Quaid
- Séamus Flanagan
