= Nickie Quaid =

Irish hurler (born 1989)

Personal information
- Born: 12 June 1989 (age 37) Effin, County Limerick, Ireland
- Occupation: Primary school teacher
- Height: 6 ft 0 in (183 cm)

Sport
- Sport: Hurling
- Position: Goalkeeper
Clubs
- Years: Club
- Effin → Emmets
Club titles
- Limerick titles: 0
College
- Years: College
- 2006–2011: Institute of Technology, Tralee
College titles
- Fitzgibbon titles: 0
Inter-county*
| Years | County | Apps (scores) |
| 2010–present | Limerick | 82 (0-01) |
Inter-county titles
- Munster titles: 8
- All-Irelands: 6
- NHL: 4
- All Stars: 4
- *Inter County team apps and scores correct as of 22:57, 30 October 2026.

Nicholas Quaid (born 12 June 1989) is an Irish hurler. At club level, he plays with Effin and at inter-county level with the Limerick senior hurling team. Quaid is the most decorated Limerick player of all time.

== Early life ==
Quaid was born in Effin, County Limerick, the middle child of three sons born to Tommy Quaid and Breda Grace. His father was an All-Ireland runner-up with Limerick as a goalkeeper in 1980. His grandfather, Jack Quaid, won a Munster Championship medal in 1955, while his cousin, Joe Quaid, was the All-Ireland runner-up goalkeeper in 1994 and 1996.

== Playing career ==
=== University ===
During his studies at the Institute of Technology, Tralee, Quaid became involved with the institute's senior hurling team. On 26 February 2011, he was at midfield when Tralee IT defeated Institute of Technology, Carlow by 1–17 to 1–15 in the final of the Ryan Cup.

=== Club ===
Quaid joined the Effin club at a young age and played in all grades at juvenile and underage levels before joining the club's junior team. On 31 October 2010, Quaid won a Limerick Junior Championship medal following Effin's 1–16 to 1–10 defeat of St. Kieran's.

As a member of divisional side Emmets, Quaid was at midfield when the team was defeated by Kilmallock in the Limerick Senior Championship final on 3 October 2010.

On 25 September 2011, Quaid was at centre-back when Effin defeated Ballybrown in the final of the Limerick Intermediate Championship. His display in the subsequent 0–14 to 0–11 defeat of Ballyduff in the Munster final earned Quaid particular praise in the media.

=== Inter-county ===
==== Minor and under-21 ====
Quaid first played for Limerick at minor level in 2006. His two seasons in the grade ended with back-to-back Munster Championship defeats by Tipperary.

On 5 June 2008, Quaid made his first appearance for the Limerick under-21 hurling team, lining out in goal in Limerick's 2–17 to 1–07 defeat of Waterford. His three seasons in the under-21 grade ended with early championship defeats.

==== Senior ====
Quaid was one of a number of new players drafted onto the Limerick senior hurling team in 2010 in place of many of the 2009 panel who refused to play under manager Justin McCarthy. On 21 February 2010, he made his senior debut at midfield for Limerick in a National League defeat by Galway at FitzGerald Park. Quaid made his first championship appearance on 20 June 2010 when he was introduced as a substitute for Andrew Brennan in the 44th minute of a Munster Championship defeat by Cork.

Following the return of many of the regular Limerick panel in 2011, Quaid was one of the few players to be retained, switching from an outfield player to goalkeeper. On 30 April 2011, he won a National League Division 2 medal after a 4–12 to 2–13 defeat of Clare in the final.

Quaid's performances during the 2012 season earned him an All-Star nomination.

On 14 July 2013, Quaid was in goal in Limerick's 0–24 to 0–15 defeat of Cork in the Munster final.

Quaid was appointed captain of the Limerick senior hurling team on 9 December 2015.

On 30 July 2018, Quaid's injury-time save from a Séamus Harnedy shot at goal in the All-Ireland semi-final the previous day was listed by Sports Illustrated as its "sports highlight of the weekend". The magazine wrote: "You can’t really call yourself a sports fan if you don’t appreciate this play...Séamus Harnedy found himself in front of the net with a chance to score a potential game-winning goal. He might have been the hero if not for this jaw-dropping effort from Limerick goalie Nickie Quaid. Quaid, while diving to his right, managed to knock the ball out of mid-air before Harnedy could hit it into the net." On 19 August 2018, Quaid was in goal when Limerick won their first All-Ireland title in 45 years after a 3–16 to 2–18 defeat of Galway in the final. He ended the season by being nominated for a second All-Star Award.

On 31 March 2019, Quaid was selected in goal for Limerick's National League final meeting with Waterford at Croke Park. He collected a winners' medal following the 1–24 to 0–19 victory. On 30 June 2019, Quaid won his first Munster Championship medal in six years following Limerick's 2–26 to 2–14 defeat of Tipperary in the final.

On 25 October 2020, Quaid won a second successive National League medal after Limerick's 0–36 to 1–23 win over Clare in the delayed final. Later that season he claimed a second successive Munster Championship medal - the third of his career - after keeping a clean sheet in the 0–25 to 0-21 Munster final defeat of Waterford. On 13 December 2020, Quaid won a second All-Ireland Championship medal after keeping a clean sheet in the 0–30 to 0–19 win over Waterford.

Quaid won an All Star at the end of the 2024 season.

=== Inter-provincial ===
On 19 February 2012, Quaid was sub goalkeeper to Donal Óg Cusack in Munster's 3–14 to 1-16 Railway Cup semi-final defeat by Leinster.

== Personal life ==
Educated at Effin national school, Quaid later attended Mannix College in Charleville. After completing his Leaving Certificate he attended the Institute of Technology, Tralee where he completed a B.Sc in health, leisure and fitness, sports development, APA, health & wellness, personal training and sports psychology. He later worked as a Sports and Recreation Facilitator at St. Joseph's Foundation in Charleville.

== Career statistics ==
As of match played 19 July 2026.

| Team | Year | National League | | | Munster | | All-Ireland | | Total | |
| Team | Year | Division | Apps | Score | Apps | Score | Apps | Score | Apps | Score |
|---|---|---|---|---|---|---|---|---|---|---|
| Limerick | 2010 | Division 1 | 7 | 0-02 | 1 | 0-00 | 1 | 0-01 | 9 | 0-03 |
| Limerick | 2011 | Division 2 | 6 | 0-00 | 1 | 0-00 | 3 | 0-00 | 10 | 0-00 |
| Limerick | 2012 | Division 1B | 6 | 0-00 | 1 | 0-00 | 4 | 0-00 | 11 | 0-00 |
| Limerick | 2013 | Division 1B | 3 | 0-00 | 2 | 0-00 | 1 | 0-00 | 6 | 0-00 |
| Limerick | 2014 | Division 1B | 5 | 0-00 | 2 | 0-00 | 2 | 0-00 | 9 | 0-00 |
| Limerick | 2015 | Division 1B | 5 | 0-00 | 2 | 0-00 | 2 | 0-00 | 9 | 0-00 |
| Limerick | 2016 | Division 1B | 6 | 0-00 | 1 | 0-00 | 2 | 0-00 | 9 | 0-00 |
| Limerick | 2017 | Division 1B | 5 | 0-00 | 1 | 0-00 | 1 | 0-00 | 7 | 0-00 |
| Limerick | 2018 | Division 1B | 6 | 0-00 | 4 | 0-00 | 4 | 0-00 | 14 | 0-00 |
| Limerick | 2019 | Division 1A | 7 | 0-00 | 5 | 0-00 | 1 | 0-00 | 13 | 0-00 |
| Limerick | 2020 | Division 1A | 4 | 0-00 | 3 | 0-00 | 2 | 0-00 | 9 | 0-00 |
| Limerick | 2021 | Division 1A | 4 | 0-00 | 2 | 0-00 | 2 | 0-00 | 8 | 0-00 |
| Limerick | 2022 | Division 1A | 2 | 0-00 | 5 | 0-00 | 2 | 0-00 | 9 | 0-00 |
| Limerick | 2023 | Division 1A | 5 | 0-00 | 5 | 0-00 | 2 | 0-00 | 12 | 0-00 |
| | 2024 | | 4 | 0-00 | 5 | 0-00 | 1 | 0-00 | 10 | 0-00 |
| | 2025 | | 0 | 0-00 | 4 | 0-00 | 1 | 0-00 | 5 | 0-00 |
| | 2026 | | 7 | 0-00 | 5 | 0-00 | 2 | 0-00 | 14 | 0-00 |
| Total | | | 83 | 0-02 | 49 | 0-00 | 33 | 0-01 | 165 | 0-03 |

== Honours ==
Institute of Technology, Tralee

- Ryan Cup (2): 2007 2011

Effin

- Munster Intermediate Club Hurling Championship (1): 2011
- Limerick Intermediate Hurling Championship (2): 2011, 2021
- Limerick Junior Hurling Championship (1): 2010

Limerick

- All-Ireland Senior Hurling Championship (6): 2018, 2020, 2021, 2022, 2023, 2026
- Munster Senior Hurling Championship (8): 2013, 2019, 2020, 2021, 2022, 2023, 2024, 2026
- National Hurling League Division 1 (4): 2019, 2020, 2023, 2026
- National Hurling League Division 2 (1): 2011

Awards

- The Sunday Game Team of the Year: 2020, 2022, 2024
- GAA GPA All Stars Awards: 2020, 2022, 2024, 2026

Sporting positions
| Preceded by Donal O'Grady | Limerick Senior Hurling Captain; 2016 | Succeeded by James Ryan |
