= N73 road (Ireland) =

National secondary road in Ireland

N73 road
- Bóthar N73
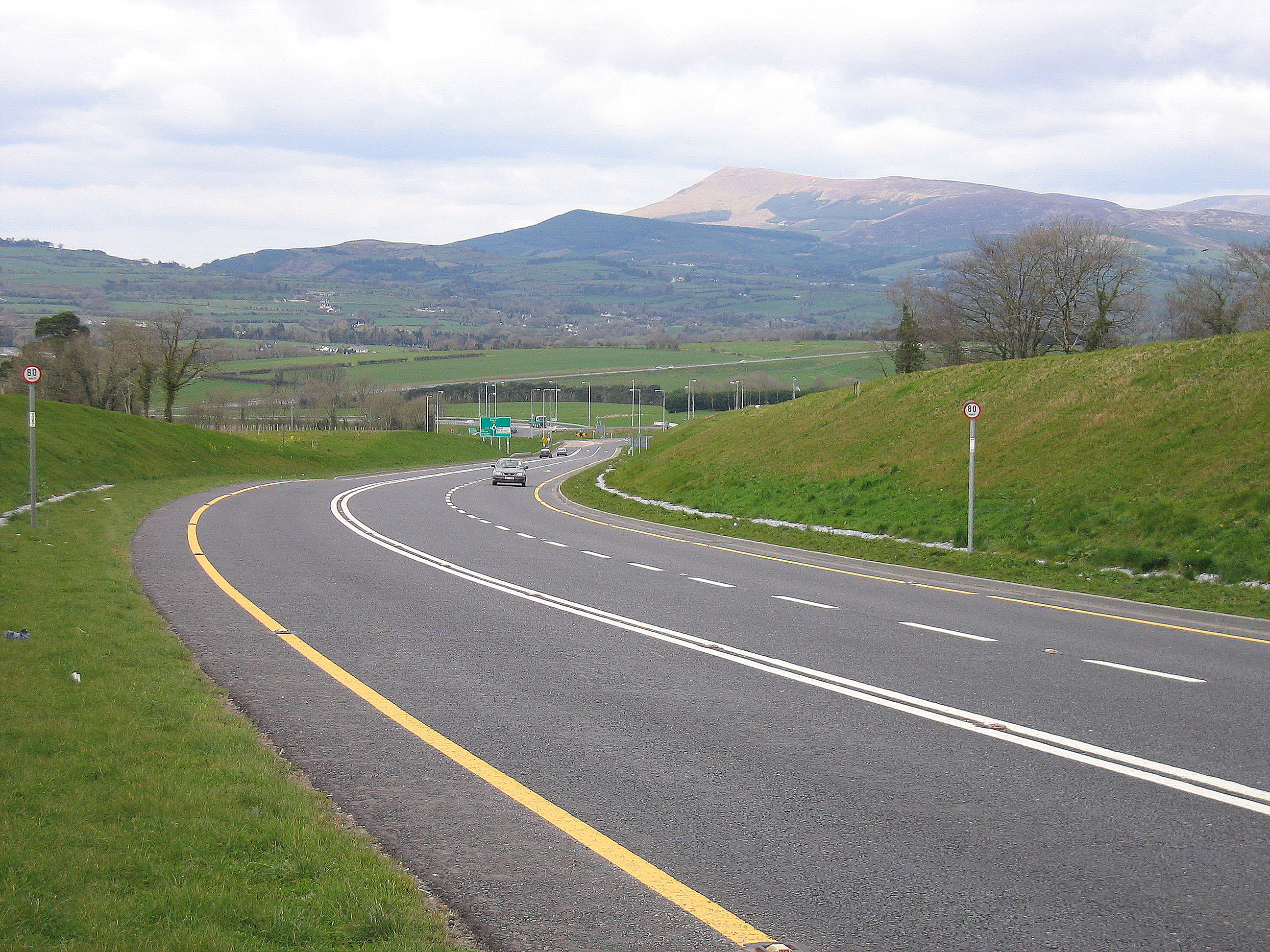
- N73 Mitchelstown bypass (formerly N8)

Route information
- Length: 34.296 km (21.311 mi)

Location
- Country: Ireland
- Primary destinations: (bypassed routes in italics): County Cork; M8 motorway; Mitchelstown; Crosses the River Funshion; Kildorrery – (R512); Farahy; (R522); Skenakilla Cross Roads; Terminates at the N72 3 km east of Mallow

Highway system
- Roads in Ireland; Motorways; Primary; Secondary; Regional

The N73 road is a national secondary road in Ireland. It is wholly within County Cork, roughly between Mitchelstown and Mallow. The road is made up almost entirely of single carriageway with few overtaking opportunities and only a small amount of hard shoulder.

== Route ==
32 km long, the N73 runs roughly east–west from its junction with the M8 motorway, bypassing Mitchelstown to the north via the Mitchelstown relief road, which opened in July 2006. The route then travels through Kildorrery, a small village and then on towards Mallow merging with the N72. There are no major improvements proposed for this route in the foreseeable future and only minor improvements have been made to date. On 25 May 2009, a Mitchelstown bypass (section of the single carriageway N8 road) was redesignated the N73 when the Mitchelstown-Fermoy section of the M8 motorway opened to traffic.

== See also ==
- Roads in Ireland
- Motorways in Ireland
- National primary road
- Regional road
