= Connello Upper =

Barony in County Limerick, Ireland

Connello Upper Conallaigh Uachtaracha (Irish)
- Barony
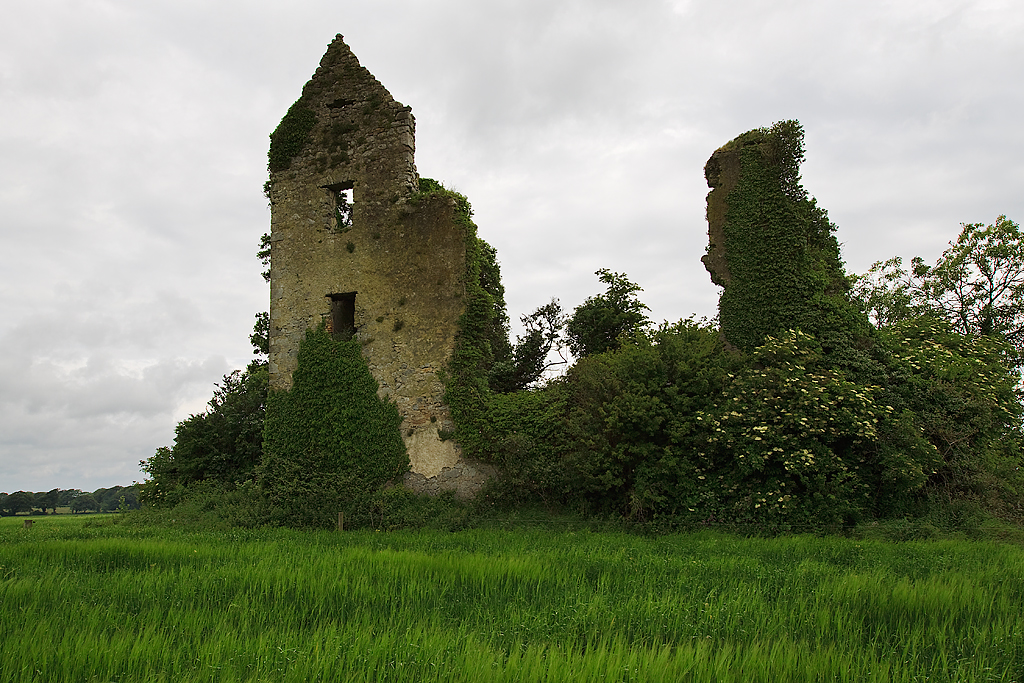
- Castle near Kilfinny

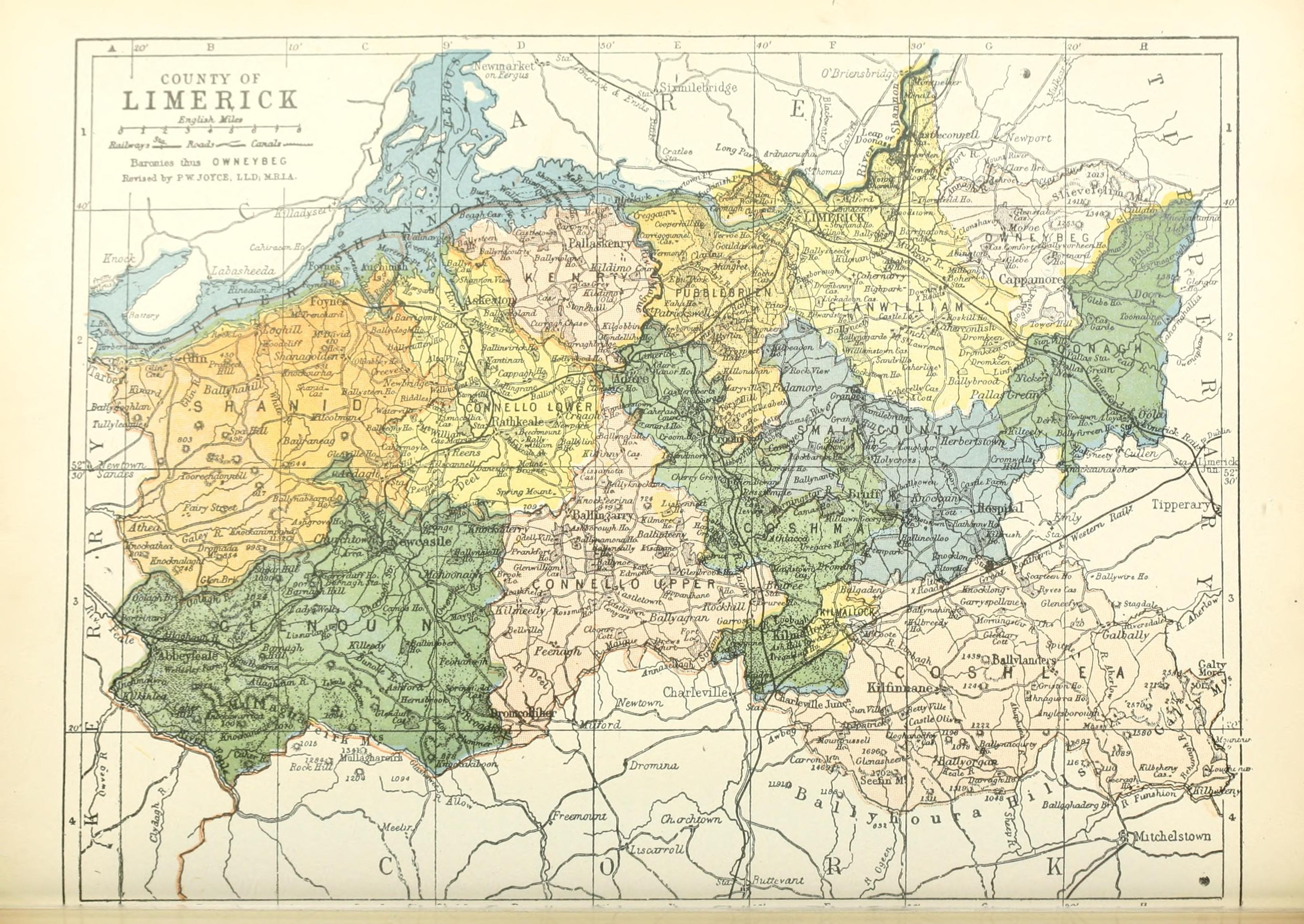
- Barony map of County Limerick, 1900; Connello Upper is in the south-centre, coloured pink.

- Location within Ireland
- Coordinates: 52°26′N 8°48′W
- Sovereign state: Ireland
- Province: Munster
- County: Limerick

Area
  - Total: 247.9 km^{2} (95.7 sq mi)

Connello Upper (Irish: Conallaigh Uachtaracha; sometimes Upper Connello, and occasionally spelled Conello) is a historical barony in southern County Limerick, Ireland.

Baronies were mainly cadastral rather than administrative units. They acquired modest local taxation and spending functions in the 19th century before being superseded by the Local Government (Ireland) Act 1898.

== History ==
Originally western Limerick was a single vast barony known as Connello. It was divided into Lower (northern) and Upper (southern) halves some time before 1821, and 1841 the western part of Connello Upper was made a separate barony, Glenquin, while the western half of Connello Lower became the barony of Shanid.

The Connello Upper region was the anciently the possession of the Uí Chonaill Gabra, part of the Uí Fidgeinti; the name refers to an ancestor, Conall Gabra, "Conall of the White Horse." Hy Cnocnuil Gabhra was the name of the Eóganachta cantred. The Ó Coileáin (Collins or Cullane) were lords of Connello until they moved to County Cork in the 13th century.

== Geography ==
Connello Upper is in the south-centre of the county, north of the River Maigue where it forms part of the border with County Cork.

== List of settlements ==
Settlements within the historical barony of Connello Upper include:

- Ballingarry
- Ballyagran
- Bruree
- Castletown
- Feenagh
- Kilfinny
- Kilmeedy
