= New Twopothouse =

Village in County Cork, Ireland

New Twopothouse Tigh Nua an Dá Phota
- Village
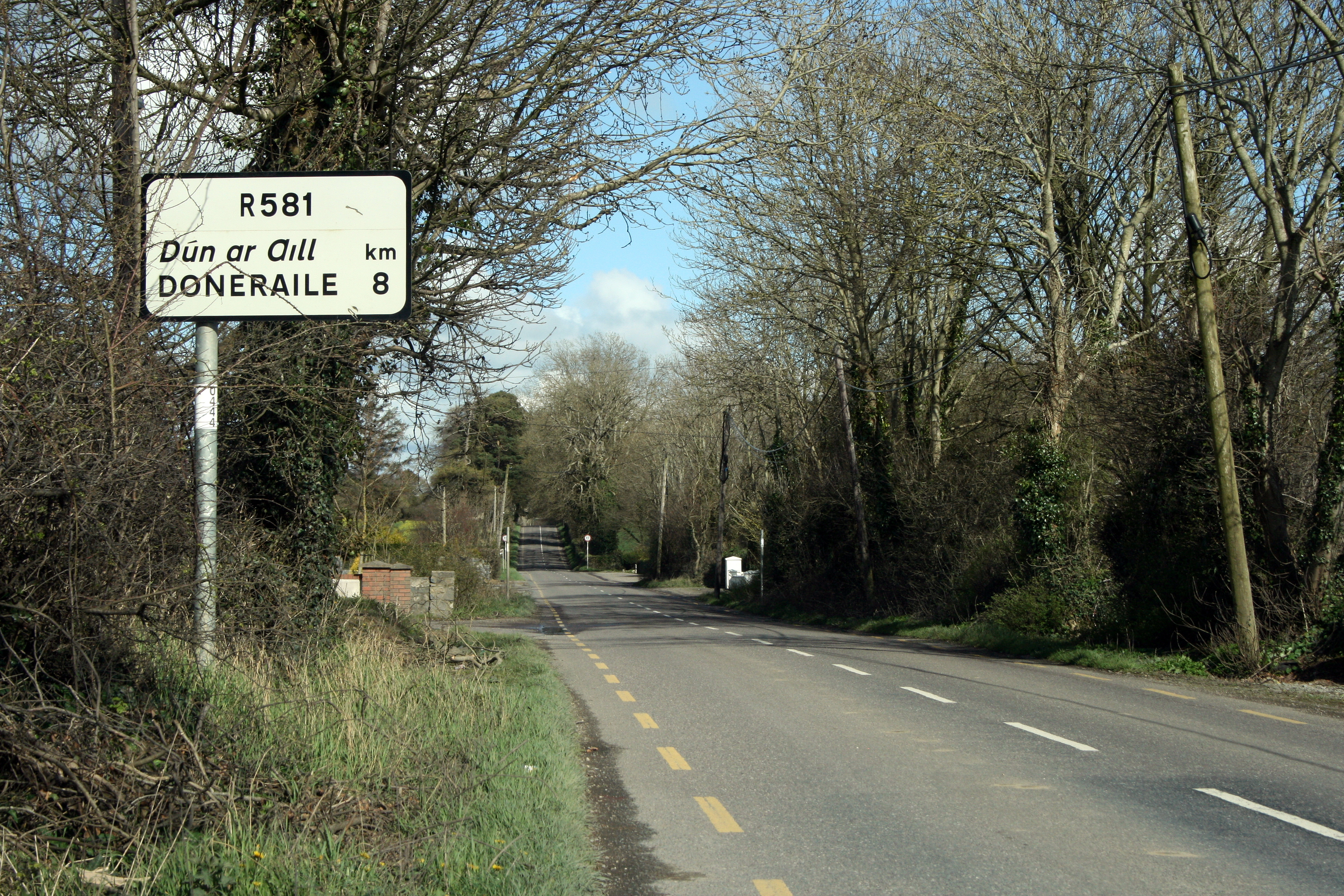
- The R581 regional road between New Twopothouse and Old Twopothouse

- Location in Ireland
- Coordinates: 52.186°N 8.671°W
- Country: Ireland
- Province: Munster
- County: Cork

Population (2016)
  - Total: 120
- Irish Grid Reference: R541039

New Twopothouse (Irish: Tigh Nua an Dá Phota) is a small village and census town in County Cork, Ireland. It is located in the civil parish of Caherduggan, on the N20 road between Mallow and Buttevant. The nearest major town is Mallow, 5 km to the south.

The area takes its name from an 18th-century coaching inn, the "Two-Pot House Inn", which was (in turn) reputedly named for two large beer "pots" which were placed outside the inn. In the 19th century, when a newer Cork to Limerick road (now the N20) was built, a coaching stop was opened and it was named "New Two-Pot-House" to distinguish it from the coaching stop on the older road.

The local Roman Catholic church, St. Joseph the Worker church, is in the neighbouring townland of Twoposthouse (sometimes known as Old Twopothouse) and was built c. 1925. The national (primary) school in New Twopothouse, Baltydaniel National School, had 209 pupils enrolled as of 2019.

New Twopothouse was designated as a census town by the Central Statistics Office for the first time in the 2016 census, at which time it had a population of 120 people.

As of 2024. the village is served by many buses every day, including Bus Éirean route 51 which runs from Cork to Galway via Limerick. There are also Local Link buses: route 522 between Charleville and Mallow, and route 523 between Mitchelstown and Mallow.
