= Willie Fitzmaurice =

Irish hurler

Personal information
- Born: December 4, 1946 (age 79) Limerick, Ireland
- Occupation: Priest

Sport
- Sport: Hurling
Club
- Years: Club
- Killeedy GAA
Inter-county
- Years: County
- 1970s and 1980s: Limerick

Willie Fitzmaurice (born 4 December 1946) was a hurler from Killeedy, south of Limerick, who played with the Limerick teams in the 1970s and 1980s

In 1998, he became a county team selector along with former teammates Éamonn Cregan and David Punch and advocated the retention of the back-door system.

He was the parish priest in Kilmallock in 2008; as such he celebrated the mass of his deceased niece, Elizabeth Gubbins, who died in the controversial Vernelli hit-and-run case in Rome.

He is the brother of Limerick hurler Paudie Fitzmaurice.

== Hurling style ==
The Fitzmaurice brothers were noted for their unusual hurling technique: when striking the sliotar, the Fitzmaurice brothers did not bend their elbows, making it difficult for their opponents to hook them.
