= Joe Quaid =

Limerick hurling goalkeeper and manager

Personal information
- Native name: Seosamh Mac Uaid (Irish)
- Born: 10 April 1972 (age 54) Feohanagh, County Limerick, Ireland
- Occupation: GAA coaching officer
- Height: 5 ft 10 in (178 cm)

Sport
- Sport: Hurling
- Position: Goalkeeper
Clubs
- Years: Club
- Feohanagh; Murroe-Boher
Club titles
- Limerick titles: 0
Inter-county*
Years	County	Apps (scores)
1991–2002	Limerick	18 (0–0)
Inter-county titles
- Munster titles: 2
- All-Irelands: 0
- NHL: 2
- All Stars: 2
- *Inter County team apps and scores correct as of 22:22, 16 September 2018.

Joseph M. Quaid (born 10 April 1972) is an Irish hurling manager and former player. He was the manager of the Westmeath senior team in 2019.

Born in Feohanagh, County Limerick, Quaid was introduced to hurling by his father, an All-Ireland medal winner with the Limerick junior team. At schools level he played with Newcastle West Vocational School, while simultaneously playing at juvenile and underage levels with Feohanagh. Eventually playing with the club's senior team, Quaid subsequently transferred to the Murroe-Boher club where he won one championship medal.

Quaid made his debut on the inter-county scene when he first linked up with the Limerick minor team. He later joined the under-21 side but enjoyed little success in either of these grades. Quaid made his senior debut during the 1994 championship. He went on to play a key role for Limerick as goalkeeper during a relatively successful era, and won two Munster medals and two National Hurling League medals. He was an All-Ireland runner-up on two occasions.

As a member of the Munster inter-provincial team, Quaid won two Railway Cup medals, one on the field of play and one as a non-playing substitute. Quaid retired from inter-county hurling following the conclusion of the 2000 championship, but returned two years later for one final season.

In retirement from playing, Quaid has become involved in team management and coaching. At club level he has taken charge of the Murroe-Boher senior team, guiding them to the semi-finals of the championship. At inter-county level he is a two-time All-Ireland-winning manager, firstly with the Limerick under-16 team and later with the Limerick intermediate camogie team. Quaid was appointed manager of the Kildare senior team on 6 October 2015.

== Early life ==
Joe Quaid was born in Ahawilk Feohanagh, County Limerick in 1972. He was born into a family that had a strong association with hurling. His father, Jim Quaid, was a key player on the Limerick team which beat London in the 1954 junior All-Ireland final. His uncle, Jack Quaid, was also a member of this side and the brothers also won Munster Senior Hurling medals in 1955, when a young Limerick side surprised a more experienced Clare side in the final. Their first cousin, Seamus Quaid, also played on Limerick senior teams and also played with Wexford, with whom he won an All Ireland senior medal in 1960. Joe succeeded his cousin playing position, Tommy Quaid, who was the goalkeeper on the Limerick team from 1976 until 1993.

== Playing career ==
=== Club ===
Quaid played his club hurling with Feohanagh and Murroe-Boher. He enjoyed some underage success with the side but failed to win a senior county championship.

=== Inter-county ===
==== Minor and under-21 ====
Quaid first played for Limerick at minor level. He made his first appearance for the team on 6 July 1988 in a 4-10 to 2-06 Munster semi-final defeat by Tipperary.

On 2 July 1989, Quaid lined out in goal for Limerick's 2-13 to 2-12 defeat by Clare in the Munster final. His third and final season on the minor team ended with a Munster semi-final defeat by Clare.

Quaid subsequently joined the Limerick under-21 hurling team. On 7 August 1991, he was in goal for Limerick's 0-17 to 1-07 defeat by Cork in the Munster final.

On 23 July 1993, Quaid made his last appearance for the under-21 team when he lined out in goal in a 1-18 to 3-09 Munster final defeat by Cork.

==== Senior ====
Quaid joined the Limerick senior team during the 1991-92 National League as understudy to regular goalkeeper Tommy Quaid. On 10 May 1992, he won a National Hurling League medal as a non-playing substitute after a 0-14 to 0-13 defeat of Tipperary in the final.

On 17 October 1993, Quaid made his debut with the Limerick senior team in a 1-13 to 0-13 National Hurling League defeat of Cork. Later that season he made his first appearance in the Munster Championship, before winning his first provincial winners' medal after a 0-25 to 2-10 defeat of Clare in the final. On 3 September 1994, Quaid lined out in goal for Limerick's All-Ireland final meeting with Offaly. With five minutes of normal time remaining, Limerick were leading by 2-13 to 1-11 and looked to be heading to their first title in 21 years when Offaly were awarded a free 20 metres from the goal. Quaid later admitted that he was to blame for the resultant goal in that he didn't organise his defence well enough to stop a low-struck free from Johnny Dooley. He was erroneously blamed for Offaly's second goal after what was described as a quick and errant puck-out leading to Pat O'Connor putting Offaly a point ahead. Quaid later described the puck-out: "I didn’t rush back to the goals. I went back and picked up the ball, walked behind the goals like I normally would. Hegarty was out in the middle of the field on his own. I dropped the ball into his hand 70 yards out from goal. He caught the ball and in contact the ball squirted out of his hands." Because the television coverage was still showing a replay of the first goal, very few people got to see the build up to the second and when live transmission was resumed, the sliotar was still dropping towards Pat O'Connor leading people to assume that Quaid rushed his puck-out. Limerick went on to lose the game by 3-16 to 2-13. Quaid ended the season by winning the All Star goalkeeping award.

On 14 July 1996, Quaid won a second Munster Championship medal in three seasons after a 4-07 to 0-16 defeat of Tipperary in the final. He later lined out in his second All-Ireland final when Limerick faced Wexford on 1 September 1996. Quaid was praised for making a series of spectacular saves during the game, however, Limerick were eventually defeated by 1-13 to 0-14. Quaid ended the season with a second All Star Award.

On 27 April 1997, Quaid suffered a serious injury in a National League game against Laois when the sliotar struck Quaid in the groin at high speed following a penalty attempt by David Cuddy. His right testicle exploded on impact while half of the other testicle had to be surgically removed. In spite of the injury, Quaid won a second National League medal on 5 October 1997 after a 1-12 to 1-09 defeat of Galway in the final.

Quaid announced his retirement from inter-county hurling on 22 October 2000. At 28, he cited the growing levels of commitment required as the principal reason for his retirement. After a year out of the game, Quaid reversed his decision and returned to the panel in January 2002. He made seven appearances throughout the league and championship that season before retiring for the second time at the end of the season.

=== Inter-provincial ===
Like both his cousin Tommy Quaid and his Uncle Jack Quaid before him, Joe was also a member of the Munster Team in 1995 and 1997. In 1995 he won a Railway Cup medal as Munster's goalkeeper. Munster defeated Leinster 2-25 to 5-12 in the semi-final of that year, before going on to beat Ulster 0-13 to 1-09 in the final.

== Management and coaching career ==
=== Murroe-Boher ===
Quaid first became involved in management when he took charge of the Morroe-Boher senior team, In 2007, he guided the team to the semi-final of the Limerick Championship where they were defeated by Adare.

=== Limerick ===
==== Under-16 ====
Quaid took over as manager of the Limerick under-16 hurling team in 2010. In his third season in charge he guided the team to the All-Ireland title after a 3-20 to 0-08 defeat of Galway in the final at Semple Stadium. The following day he was informed by the Limerick County Board that he had been overlooked to progress with the team as manager of the Limerick minor hurling team for 2013, a decision which prompted him to decline the position of selector.

==== Camogie ====
In 2013 Quaid took charge of the Limerick intermediate camogie team. On 5 May 2013, he guided the team to a National League Division 2 title and promotion after a 3-14 to 0-10 defeat of Kildare in the final. On 15 September 2013, Quaid's Limerick to the All-Ireland Intermediate Championship final where they were beaten by Galway.

On 14 September 2014, Quaid's Limerick intermediate team lined out in a second successive All-Ireland Intermediate Championship final. A 1-12 to 0-10 defeat of Kilkenny secured the title and promotion to the All-Ireland Senior Championship.

Quaid's third season in charge saw Limerick finish in fourth position in Group 1 of the All-Ireland Championship. He stepped down as manager in August 2015.

=== Kildare ===
On 6 October 2015, Quaid was appointed manager of the Kildare senior hurling team. His first season in charge saw Kildare finish in fifth position in Division 2A of the National Hurling League while the team reached the semi-final of the Christy Ring Cup where they were beaten by eventual winners Meath.

Quaid's second season in charge saw Kildare finish in third position in Division 2A of the league and narrowly miss out on a place in the final. In the subsequent Christy Ring Cup, Kildare reached the quarter-finals where they were defeated again by eventual champions Carlow.

Quaid's Kildare lost all of their group stage games during the 2018 league and were relegated to Division 2B. On 23 June 2018, he guided Kildare to a 3-19 to 1-11 defeat of London to win their second ever Christy Ring Cup title.

Quaid stepped down as Kildare manager on 29 August 2018.

=== Westmeath ===
On 13 September 2018, Quaid was appointed manager of the Westmeath senior hurling team. He led the Midlanders to a National Hurling League Div 2A title in the spring by overcoming Kerry in the final. The win secured the Lake County's return to Division 1 hurling at the first time in 32 years.

He later seen his side qualify for the Joe McDonagh Cup decider where Westmeath lost out to Laois in Corke Park. In the All-Ireland preliminary quarter-finals Quaids side went down to Cork on a 1-40 to 0-20 scoreline. He also led Westmeath to Kehoe Cup honours.

Quaid left as manager of Westmeath in July 2019 after one year in charge.

== Career statistics ==
Team	Year	National League			Munster		All-Ireland		Total	
Team	Year	Division	Apps	Score	Apps	Score	Apps	Score	Apps	Score
Limerick	1991-92	Division 1A	0	0-00	0	0-00	—		0	0-00
Limerick	1992-93	Division 1A	0	0-00	0	0-00	—		0	0-00
Limerick	1993-94	Division 1	3	0-00	3	0-00	2	0-00	8	0-00
Limerick	1994-95	Division 1	7	0-00	2	0-00	—		9	0-00
Limerick	1995-96	Division 2	7	0-01	4	0-00	2	0-00	13	0-01
Limerick	1997	Division 1A	7	0-00	1	0-00	—		8	0-00
Limerick	1998	Division 1A	5	0-00	1	0-00	—		6	0-00
Limerick	1999	Division 1A	5	0-00	1	0-00	—		6	0-00
Limerick	2000	Division 1A	1	0-00	1	0-00	—		2	0-00
Limerick	2001	Division 1A	—		—		—		—	
Limerick	2002	Division 1B	6	0-00	1	0-00	0	0-00	7	0-00
Total			41	0-01	14	0-00	4	0-00	59	0-01

== Honours ==
=== Player ===
Limerick

- Munster Senior Hurling Championship (2): 1994, 1996
- National Hurling League (2): 1991-92, 1997
- All-Ireland Under-16 Hurling Championship (1): 2012

Munster

- Railway Cup (2): 1995, 1997

=== Manager ===
Limerick

- All-Ireland Intermediate Camogie Championship (1): 2014
- National Camogie League Division 2 (1): 2013

Kildare

- Christy Ring Cup (1): 2018

Westmeath

- National Hurling League Div 2A (1): 2019
- Kehoe Cup (1): 2019

Sporting positions
Preceded by Brian Lawlor	Kildare senior hurling team manager 2015–2018	Succeeded by David Herity
Preceded by Michael Ryan	Westmeath senior hurling team manager 2018–2019	Succeeded by Shane O'Brien
Achievements
Preceded by Colm Bonnar	Christy Ring Cup Final winning manager 2018	Succeeded by Nick Fitzgerald
