= Killaliathan Church =

- Killagholehane Church
- Cill Achadh Uí Liatháin
- Location within Ireland
- 52.331812°N 8.977135°W
- Location: Lacka Lower, Broadford, County Limerick
- Country: Ireland
- Denomination: Church of Ireland
- Previous denomination: Catholic (pre-Reformation)

History
- Dedication: Our Lady of the Snows

Architecture
- Functional status: inactive
- Years built: 15th century AD
- Closed: 1812

Specifications
- Length: 14 m (46 ft)
- Width: 9 m (30 ft)
- Materials: limestone, mortar

Administration
- Diocese: Limerick and Killaloe
Designations
National monument of Ireland
- Official name: Killaliathan Church
- Reference no.: 86

Killaliathan Church, also called Killagholehane Church, is a medieval church and a National Monument in County Limerick.

== Location ==
The church is located 1.6 kilometres (0.99 mi) south of Broadford, County Limerick.

== History ==
The site was the location of an earlier Christian church, established c. 1200 after a summer snowfall that covered the entire area, except for the field, so the church was dedicated to Our Lady of the Snows. The land was donated by the local rulers, the Uí Liatháin, and so it was named Cill Achadh Uí Liatháin, "church of Uí Liatháin's field," or Killaliathan. The original church was destroyed in war in 1302, and a new church erected in its place. This was called Killagholehane (Cill Deochain Liatháin, "Deacon Liathán's church").

Killaliathan Church was replaced by a new Church of Ireland church in the village of Broadford in 1812. The graveyard is still in use.

== Church ==
The division of the east window into three lights is unusual. The baptismal font, a 15th-century tomb, and part of the sacristy still remain. A gallery once stood above the doorway. The tomb may belong to the famous Ó Dálaigh bardic family.
