= Íte of Killeedy =

Irish saint

Saint Íte
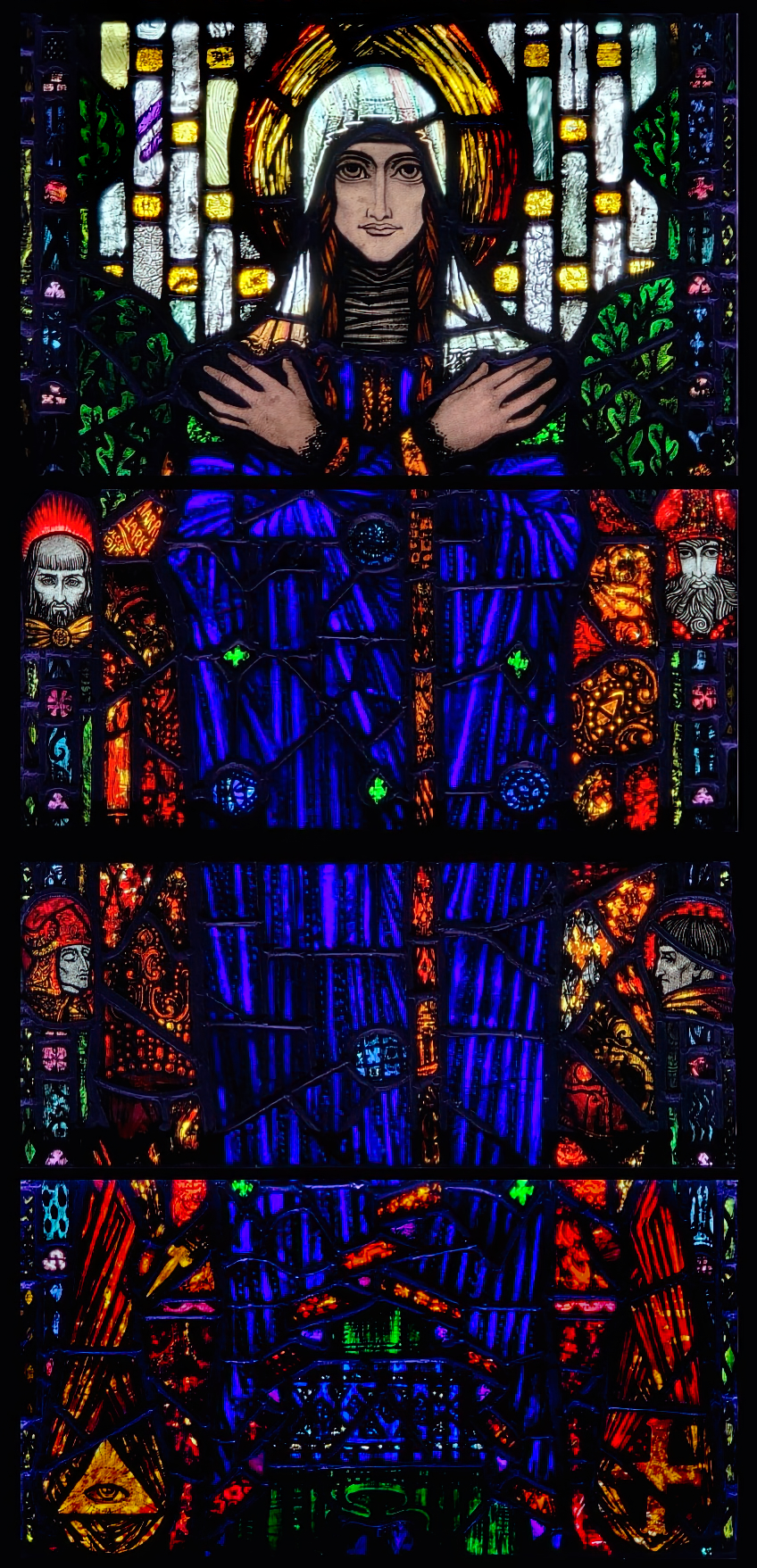
- St. Ita by Harry Clarke at the Honan Chapel
- Born: c. 480; County Waterford, Ireland
- Died: 15 January 570
- Venerated in: Catholic Church; Orthodox Church
- Feast: 15 January
- Patronage: Roman Catholic Diocese of Limerick, Ireland, Killeedy, Ireland

Íte ingen Chinn Fhalad (died c. 570–577), also known as Íde, Ita, Ida or Ides, was an early Irish nun and patron saint of Killeedy (Cluain Creadhail). She was known as the "foster mother of the saints of Erin". The name "Ita" ("thirst for holiness") was conferred on her because of her saintly qualities. Her feast day is 15 January.

== Life ==
Ita, called the "Brigid of Munster", was born in 480 in the present County Waterford. Her father was Cennfoelad or Confhaola and her mother was Necta. Cennfoelad was descended from Felim the lawgiver, King of Tara. An account of her life in the Codex Kilkenniensis, follows the example of Brigit in describing the opposition Íte meets in pursuit of her vocation. Genealogies of the saints go so far as to make Íte's mother, Necht, a daughter of Dallbrónach, and therefore a sister of Brigit's mother.

She was baptised as Deirdre and grew up near Drum, County Waterford. Ita was said to embody the six virtues of Irish womanhood – wisdom, purity, beauty, musical ability, gentle speech and needle skills. She is also reported to have rejected a prestigious marriage for a life as a consecrated woman religious. At the age of sixteen, she moved to Cluain Creadhail, a place name that has ever since been known as Killeedy – meaning "Church of St. Ita" – in County Limerick, where she founded a small community of nuns and resided for the remainder of her life, in community with other consecrated women. Bishop Declan of Ardmore conferred the veil on her. Legend has it that Ita was led to Killeedy by three heavenly lights. The first was at the top of the Galtee mountains, the second on the Mullaghareirk mountains and the third at Cluain Creadhail, which is nowadays Killeedy. Her sister Fiona also went to Killeedy with her and became a member of the community.

A strongly individualistic character is glimpsed in the stories that surround her life. When she decided to settle in Killeedy, a chieftain offered her a large grant of land to support the convent. But Ita would accept only four acres, which she cultivated intensively. The community group seems to have had a school for little boys where they were taught "Faith in God with purity of heart; simplicity of life with religion; generosity with love". Her pupils are said to have included Saint Brendan, whom Bishop Erc gave to Ita in foster care when he was a year old. St. Ita kept him until he was six.

The great Navigator visited her between his voyages and always deferred to her counsel. Brendan is believed to have asked her what three things God loved best. "True faith in God and a pure heart, a simple life with a religious spirit and open-handedness inspired by charity," she answered. The three things God most detested were a scowling face, obstinacy in wrongdoing, and too great a confidence in the power of money.

She dedicated herself to prayer, fasting, simplicity and cultivating a gift for spiritual discernment. She was also endowed with the gift of prophecy and was held in great veneration by a large number of contemporary saints, men as well as women. Ita was said to have a gift for guiding people in holiness. She was much sought after as a spiritual director. During this period of Christianity, the Celtic Church was more advanced than other churches at the time in recognising the qualities of spiritual leadership in women and in encouraging women in this role. It is thought that Ita may have been abbess of a double monastery of men and women.

Her legend places a great deal of emphasis on her austerity, as told by St. Cuimin of County Down, and numerous miracles are recorded of her. She is also said to be the originator of an Irish lullaby for the infant Jesus, an English version of which was set for voice and piano by the American composer Samuel Barber. Saint Ita is believed to have suffered from a severe illness, which some sources suggest may have been cancer. Contemporary accounts, often written in the symbolic and allegorical style of medieval hagiography, describe her suffering in vivid terms, reflecting the physical and spiritual trials she endured with great faith and patience. When she felt her end approaching she sent for her community of nuns, and invoked the blessing of heaven on the clergy and laity of the district around Kileedy. Ita died sometime around 570.

== Veneration ==
Her grave, frequently decorated with flowers, is in the ruins of Cill Ide, a Romanesque church at Killeedy where her monastery once stood. It was destroyed by Viking invaders in the ninth century. A Romanesque church was later built over its ruins, but that too failed to survive. The site, however, remains a place of pilgrimage today.

A holy well nearby, almost invisible now, was known for centuries for curing smallpox in children and other diseases as well. This well has two names – It is called St. Bernard's Well on the OS map, but the local name has always been Tobar Bhaile Ui MhÈidÌn, My Little Ita's Well, coming from the place name, Cill Barra MhÈidÌn. "Church of my little Ita's Height."

Not only was St. Ita a saint, but she was the foster mother of St. Brendan the Navigator, and St. Pulcherius (Mochoemog). At the request of Bishop Butler of Limerick, Pope Pius IX granted a special Office and Mass for the feast of St. Ita, which is kept on 15 January. Although not on the Roman calendar of saints, her feast is celebrated as an optional memorial in Ireland. She is also celebrated by the Eastern Orthodox Church on 15 January on the New Calendar.

== Patronage ==
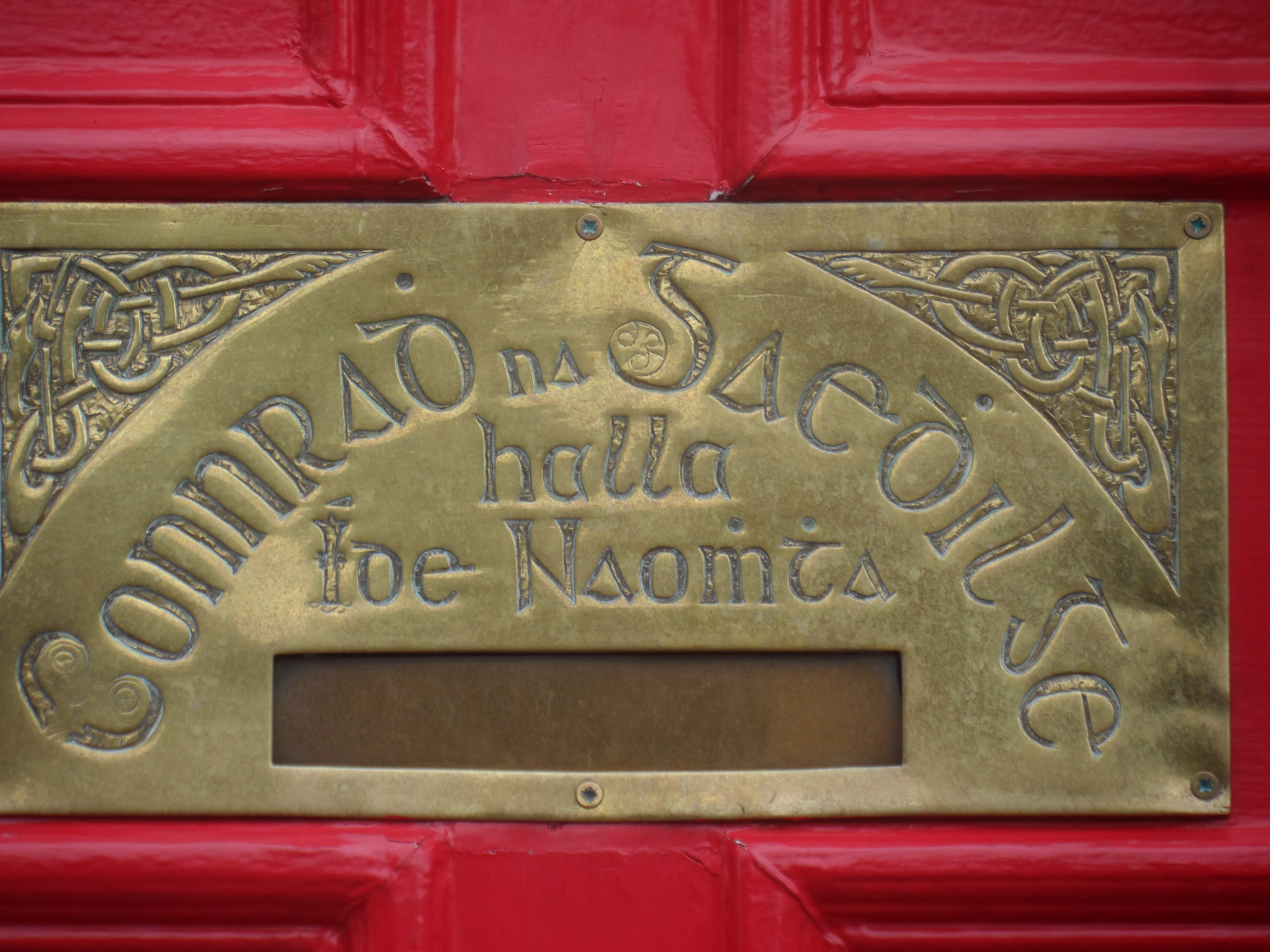
Conradh na Gaeilge hall in Limerick bearing St. Íde's name.

St Ita is the patron saint of Killeedy, Ireland, and along with St. Munchin is co-patron of the Diocese of Limerick. She is reportedly a good intercessor in terms of pregnancy and eye illnesses.

St. Ita's AFC is the name of the association football club which is based in Killeedy. The saint appears on the club's crest.

Another village in County Limerick, Kilmeedy (Irish: Cill m'Íde; "Church of my Ita") has links with the saint as well – having first set up a church in Kilmeedy before the one in Killeedy.

== Sources ==
- Orthodox Church in America
- Hutchison-Hall, John (Ellsworth) (2013). Orthodox Saints of the British Isles. Vol. I – January–March. United States of America: St. Eadfrith Press. ISBN 978-0-615-92580-6.
