= R581 road (Ireland) =

Road in Ireland

R581 road
- Bóthar R581
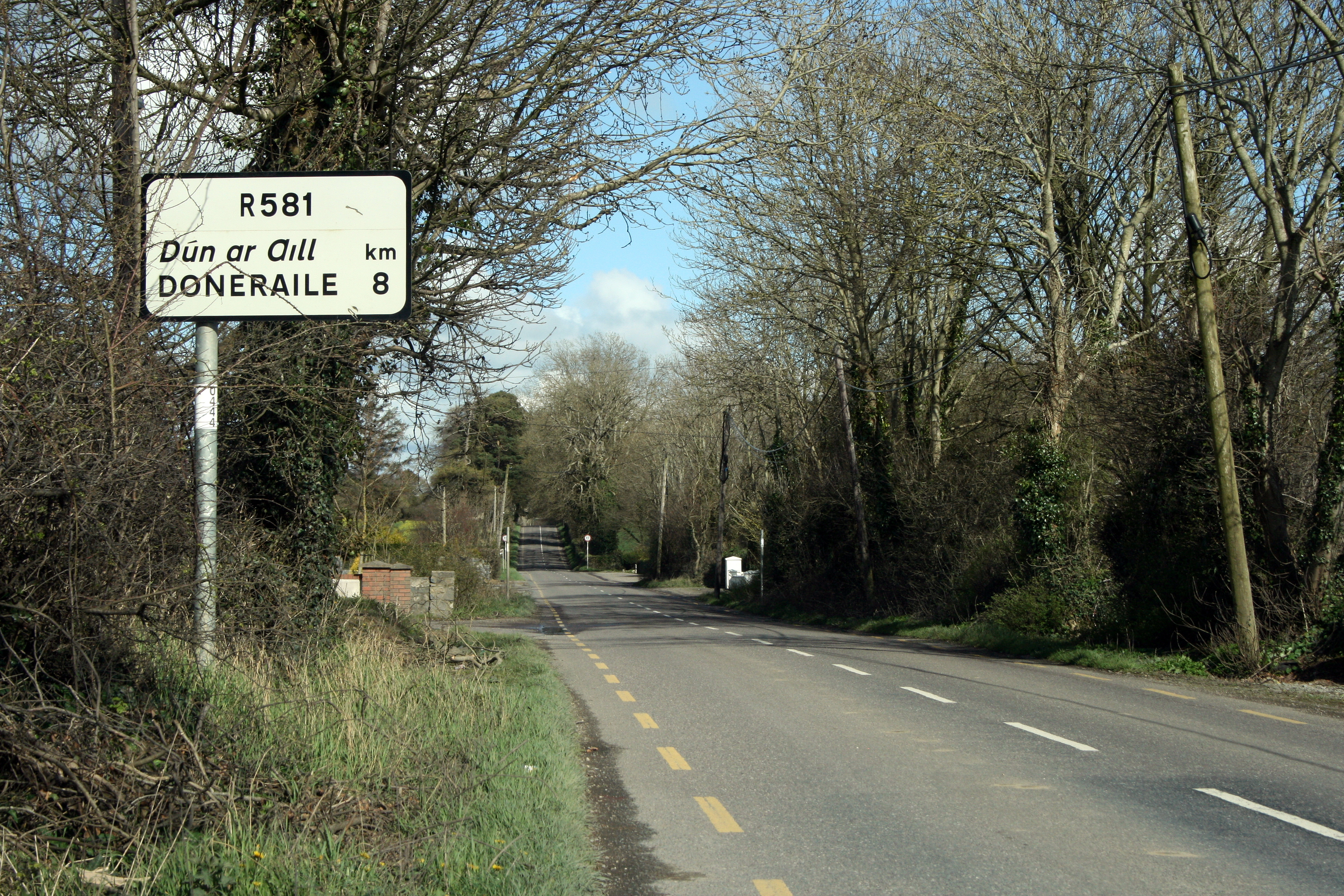
- R581 leaving the N20 (between New Twopothouse village and Old Twopothouse crossroads)

Route information
- Length: 8 km (5.0 mi)

Location
- Country: Ireland
- Primary destinations: County Cork; Leaves the N20 at New Twopothouse Village; Old Twopothouse Cross Roads; Doneraile - Main Street; terminates at the R522 north of the town

Highway system
- Roads in Ireland; Motorways; Primary; Secondary; Regional

The R581 road is a regional road in Ireland which runs from the N20 at New Twopothouse village to Doneraile in County Cork.

The road is 8km long.

In 2012 and 2013 the R581 was realigned to straighten it and to bypass some habitations. In 2011 archeological investigations in advance of the realignment were conducted by Rubicon Heritage and revealed the site of the former Caherduggan Castle east of Old Twopothouse at 52.1981°N 8.6281°W.

== See also ==
- Roads in Ireland
- National primary road
- National secondary road
