= R522 road (Ireland) =

Regional road in Ireland

R522 road
- Bóthar R522
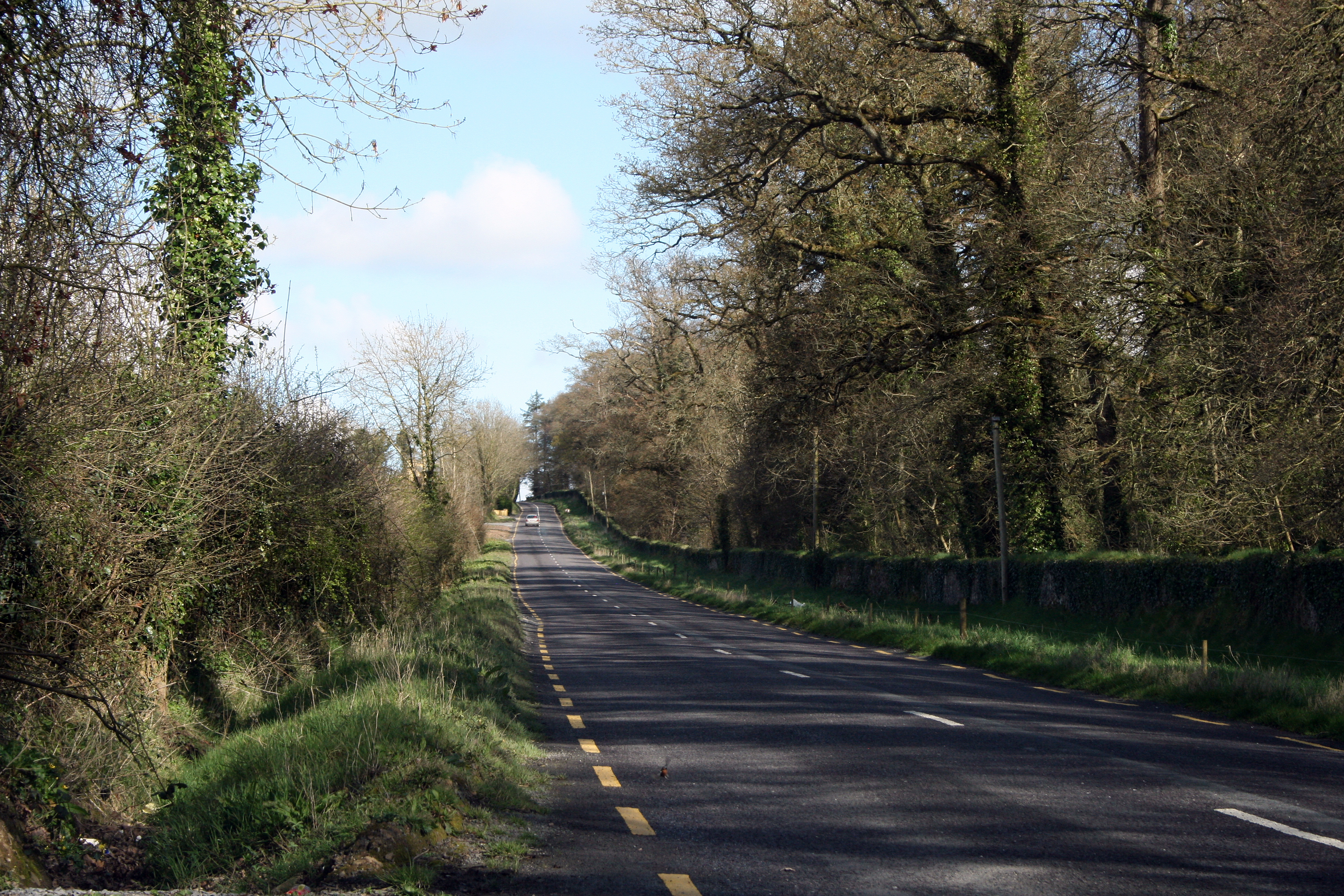
- R522 near Doneraile

Route information
- Length: 51 km (32 mi)

Location
- Country: Ireland
- Primary destinations: County Limerick; Newcastlewest - leaves the N21; (R520); Shanrath; Feohanagh; Dromcolliher - (R515); County Cork; (R578); Liscarroll; Buttevant - (N20); Doneraile - (R581); Terminates at a junction with the N73 east of Doneraile.

Highway system
- Roads in Ireland; Motorways; Primary; Secondary; Regional

The R522 road is a regional road in Ireland which runs 51 kilometres from Newcastlewest in County Limerick to the N73 national secondary road near Doneraile in County Cork, passing through Dromcolliher and Buttevant.

== See also ==
- Roads in Ireland
- National primary road
- National secondary road
