= 1981 Munster Senior Hurling Championship final =

Hurling match played in Ireland

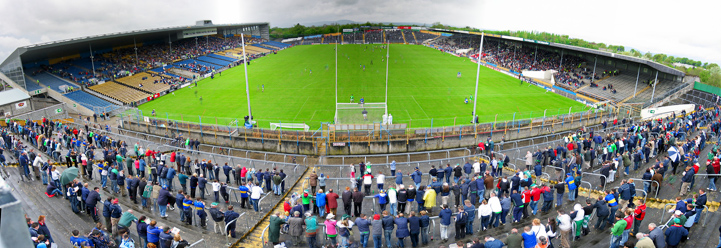
- Event: 1981 Munster Senior Hurling Championship
Limerick	Clare
3-12	2-9
- Date: 5 July 1981
- Venue: Semple Stadium, Thurles
- Referee: Ger Ryan (Tipperary)
- Attendance: 40,205

The 1981 Munster Senior Hurling Championship final was a hurling match played at Semple Stadium on 5 July 1981 to determine the winners of the 1981 Munster Senior Hurling Championship. The final was contested by Limerick and Clare, with Limerick winning by 3-12 to 2-9.

This was the 94th season of the Munster Senior Club Hurling Championship, a tournament organised by the Munster Council of the Gaelic Athletic Association. The Munster final between Limerick and Clare was the 4th Munster final meeting between the two teams. Limerick were hoping for their 16th Munster title and a second successive title. Clare were hoping for their 4th Munster title and their first win since 1932.
