= Tommy Quaid =

Irish hurler

Personal information
- Native name: Tomás Mac Uaid (Irish)
- Born: 23 April 1957 Charleville, County Cork, Ireland
- Died: 10 October 1998 (aged 41)
- Occupation: Fitter
- Height: 5 ft 10 in (178 cm)

Sport
- Sport: Hurling
- Position: Goalkeeper
Clubs
- Years: Club
- 1972–1994 1994–1998: Feohanagh-Castlemahon; Effin
Inter-county
Years	County	Apps (scores)
1976–1993	Limerick	36 (0-00)
Inter-county titles
- Munster titles: 2
- All-Irelands: 0
- NHL: 3
- All Stars: 1

Tommy Quaid (23 April 1957 – 10 October 1998) was an Irish sportsperson. He played hurling at various times with his local clubs Feohanagh-Castlemahon and Effin and was the goalkeeper on the Limerick senior inter-county team from 1976 until 1993. Quaid was regarded as one of the greatest goalkeepers of his generation.

== Biography ==
Tommy Quaid was born in Charleville, County Cork in 1957. The son of Bridie (née Collins) and Jack Quaid, he was born into a family that had a strong association with hurling. His father was one of the key players on the Limerick team which beat London in the 1954 All-Ireland junior final. He won a senior Munster title the following year when a Mick Mackey-trained team shocked Clare in the provincial decider. Quaid's five children all followed in their father's footsteps on the hurling field. Séamus Quaid was a stalwart of the Feohanagh club until he emigrated to Australia. John Quaid went on to represent his county at minor and under 21 levels while Pat Quaid also served as a member of the Limerick under-21 hurling panel. Noreen Quaid also represented her County and local club in Feoghangh.

The Quaid family moved to Feohanagh, County Limerick when Tommy was just a few years old. He was educated at the local national school before later attending secondary school in nearby Newcastle West.

Quaid trained as a fitter with the local Golden Vale company and later set up his own engineering business. In retirement from inter-county hurling he built up his business. In 1998, however, tragedy struck. While working on the Credit Union building in Charleville, the place of his birth, Quaid fell twenty feet from some scaffolding and landed on his back, hitting his head in the process. He was immediately rushed to hospital, however, he died from his injuries several days later on 10 October 1998.

Quaid's sons Tomás and Nicky represented Limerick at underage levels and were members of the Effin team that lost the 2007 Limerick Junior 'A' hurling final to a Caherline team. Nickie Quaid now plays in goal for the Limerick senior hurling team.

== Playing career ==
=== Club ===
Quaid played his club hurling with his local Feohanagh-Castlemahon club. In spite of being a goalkeeper at inter-county level he played as a forward during most of his club career and, more often than not, he also served as the team's free-taker. Quaid's club career got off to a less than auspicious start. After losing back-to-back minor finals he subsequently joined the club's under-21 team. Success, however, also eluded him in this grade as he suffered the heartbreak of losing four consecutive Under-21 West Division finals. Quaid's most successful hour came in 1990 when he captained Feohanagh-Castlemahon to a West Limerick senior hurling title. Unfortunately he never won a county senior title. In later years he played his club hurling with Effin, where he won three South Limerick junior hurling titles.

=== Inter-county ===
Quaid's performances at club level brought him to the attentions of the inter-county selectors. He was passed over for inter-county duty on the Limerick minor team in 1973, however, he joined the side the following year as goalkeeper. He spent an unsuccessful two-year spell with the Limerick minors. Quaid later joined the county under-21 hurling team, however, in spite of a disastrous Munster final appearance in 1977, he enjoyed little success.

In 1975 Quaid joined the Limerick senior hurling team, making his debut in a National Hurling League quarter-final against Kilkenny. The young goalkeeper, however, took stage fright and had a nightmare of a game. By 1976 Quaid had redeemed himself and took over from Séamus Horgan as first-choice goalkeeper for the championship.

Quaid's side contested the Munster final 1976, however, Cork were victorious on that occasion as Limerick went into decline. They were completely trounced again in 1979 on a score line of 2–14 to 0–9 as Cork captured a record-equaling fifth Munster title in-a-row.

In 1980 Cork were going for a sixth Munster Championship in succession. For the fourth time in six years Limerick provided the opposition in the provincial decider. After an exciting seventy minutes Cork's hopes were dashed by 2–14 to 2–10 as Quiad collected a first Munster winners' medal. This victory allowed Limerick a save passage to the All-Ireland final where Galway were the opponents. Galway got off to a good start and took a 2–7 to 1–5 lead at half-time. Éamonn Cregan had other ideas and single-handedly launched the Limerick counter-attack. Over the course of the game he scored 2–7, including an overhead goal and a point in which he showed the ball to Conor Hayes and nonchalantly drove the ball over the bar. It was not enough to stem the tide and Galway went on to win the game. It was the county's first All-Ireland title since 1923 and, ironically, Limerick were the defeated team on that occasion as well.

Limerick retained their provincial crown in 1981. Clare were defeated on that occasion by 3–12 to 2–9 giving Quiad his second Munster medal. The subsequent All-Ireland semi-final saw Limerick take on Offaly. It was the first meeting of these two sides in the history of the hurling championship. In a low-scoring game both sides finished level and a replay was necessary. The second game took place a fortnight later at Croke Park and it turned out to be an exciting affair. Both sides upped their game, however, Limerick were still defeated by 4–16 to 2–17.

Following back-to-back Munster triumphs Limerick went into decline in the championship. Quaid's side did have some notable victories in the National League. In 1984 he won his first National League medal following a 3–16 to 1–9 victory over Wexford. The win was all the more special as it was the centenary year of the Gaelic Athletic Association. A second National League title was collected by Quaid in 1985 following a trouncing of Clare.

After some time out of the limelight Quaid won a third National League medal in 1992 following a one-point victory over Tipperary. Limerick later qualified for the Munster final, however, Cork were the victors on that occasion. In spite of ending up on the losing side Quaid's championship performance earned him his first, and only, All-Star award.

Following the completion of the 1993 Munster championship Quaid decided to retire after 18 consecutive championship seasons as goalkeeper. He was replaced on the Limerick team by his cousin, Joe Quaid.

=== Interprovincial ===
Quaid was also a regular on the Munster inter-provincial hurling team between 1979 and 1992. In 1981 he collected his first Railway Cup medal following a ten-point defeat of arch-rivals Leinster. A second defeat of Leinster in 1984 gave him a second Railway Cup title while Connacht were accounted for in 1985. Quaid won a fourth and final Railway Cup winners' medal in 1992.

=== Poc Fada ===
Quaid also won numerous awards as an individual and in pairs competitions in the All-Ireland Poc Fada Championship. In 1983 Quaid and Joe Shortt from Armagh won the pairs competition with 154 pucks. Three years later in 1986 he collected another pairs title, this time with John Kelly of Offaly as his partner. Quaid and Des Donnelly of Antrim won the title in 1990, while together with Michael Sahughnessy of Galway he retained the pairs competition title in 1991. That same year Quaid also won the All-Ireland title in the singles competition.

== Managerial career ==
In retirement from playing at inter-county level, Quaid became involved in the management side of hurling. In 1998 he guided the Limerick intermediate hurlers to a Munster title in that grade following a 2–11 to 0–15 defeat of Tipperary. Quaid's side later qualified for the All-Ireland final, with Kilkenny providing the opposition. Unfortunately, that game took place in the same week that Quaid suffered his fatal accident at work. He died on the same day that game was taking place, however, his emotion-filled Limerick team went on to win the game by 4–16 to 2–17. A poem was written by Garry McMahon in the wake of his death called Lament for Tommy Quaid.

== Tommy Quaid Perpetual Cup ==
On 1 May 2008, the Iverahain Golf Society launched the inaugural Tommy Quaid Perpetual Cup in 'The Hurlers', Castletroy, County Limerick. Membership of the society is confined to men who have worn the hurling Number 1 jersey at senior inter-county level for one of the six Munster counties. The Tommy Quaid Perpetual Cup is awarded to the winner of this annual competition and the outing will alternate between the six Munster counties over the coming years. Present and former hurling goalkeepers from the entire province have jumped at the opportunity of participating in this novel outing. The event was launched by former Clare goalkeeper Davy Fitzgerald. Also in attendance was Brian Murray (Limerick goalkeeper) and Donal Óg Cusack (Cork goalkeeper).
