= River Deel (Shanon estuary) =

Tributary of the Shannon in southwestern Ireland

Coordinates: 52.620661°N 8.988528°W

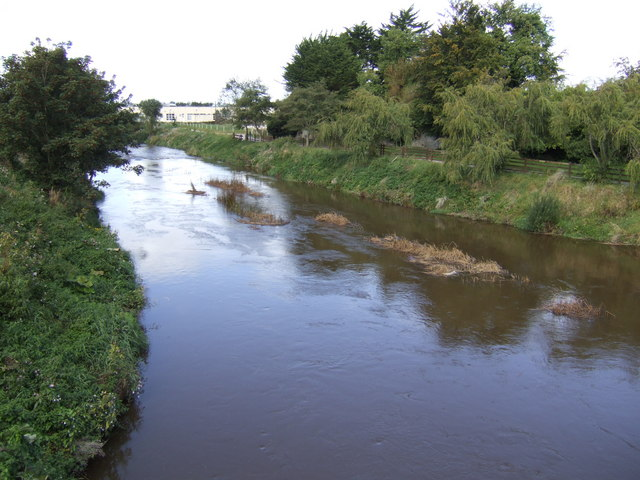
- River Deel west of Rathkeale
- Etymology: From Irish daol, "chafer"
- Native name: An Daoil (Irish)

Location
- Country: Ireland

Physical characteristics
- Source
  - location: near Dromina, County Cork
- Mouth: Shannon Estuary
  - location: Mantlehill, County Limerick
- Length: 63.2 km (39.3 mi)
- Basin size: 481 km^{2} (186 sq mi)
- Discharge
  - average: 12.56 m^{3}/s (444 cu ft/s)

Do not confuse this river with River Deal, a tributary of River Boyne.

The River Deel (Irish: An Daoil) in Ireland is a tributary of the Shannon Estuary. It flows in County Cork and County Limerick.

It rises near Dromina in north County Cork and flows north into County Limerick for over 60km to enter the Shannon Estuary.

After its source, it passes the following areas, first Milford and down towards Belville bridge, then on to Castlemahon (Mahoonagh) and nearby Newcastle West, running parallel to the main Limerick-Killarney N21 road, to reach Rathkeale.

After leaving Rathkeale, the river crosses the N21 and flows north to Askeaton. It then crosses the N69 before entering the Shannon Estuary a further 4 km north.

== Name ==
The Deel derives its name from daol, an Irish word for a beetle, insect or worm, because of its winding, bending shape.

== Fishing ==
The Deel was once a good salmon and grilse fishery but now is mainly fished for brown trout.
