= Dromcolliher =

Town in County Limerick, Ireland

Dromcollogher Drom Collachair
- Village
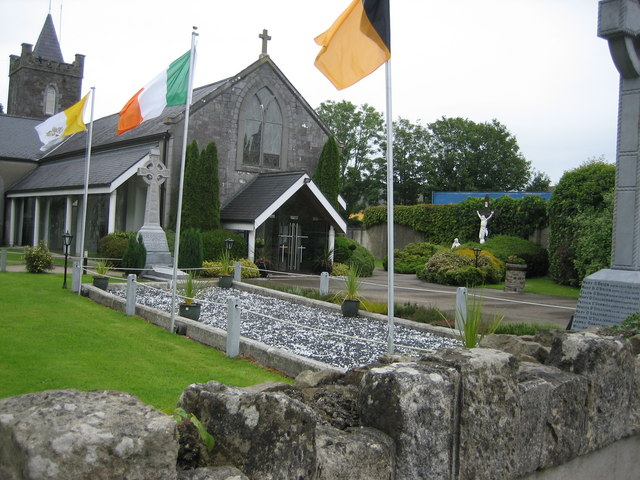
- Church at Dromcollogher

- Location in Ireland
- Coordinates: 52°20′N 8°55′W
- Country: Ireland
- Province: Munster
- County: County Limerick

Population (2016)
  - Total: 518
- Time zone: UTC+0 (WET)
  - Summer (DST): UTC-1 (IST (WEST))
- Irish Grid Reference: R380212

Dromcollogher, officially Dromcolliher (Irish: Drom Collachair), is a village and civil parish in the west of County Limerick, Ireland. The village, which is located at the crossroads of the R522 and R515 regional roads, is part of the ecclesiastical parish of Dromcollogher-Broadford (previously known as Killagholehane). It is also very close to the northern boundary of County Cork.

There are many variations of 'Drom'. The locals spell it Dromcollogher, but Drumcolloher, Dromcolloher, Drumcullogher, and numerous other variations can be found. Dromcolliher is the version adopted by the Ordnance Survey, and postal authorities.

== History ==
Dromcollogher was first mentioned in 1160 in the Book of Leinster. Other historical records include references in "Westropp" (1201), Munster Journal (1751), and the population was recorded as 658 in 1831.

It is classed as a medieval town by Limerick County Council, and the council's 'County Development Plan' lists a number of protected structures in the area. These include the local creamery, courthouse, and the churches of Killagholehane and St. Timothy (now known as St. Bartholomew). This church was built in 1824, by Fr. Micheal Fitzgerald, who purchased the land from a local landowner. It was restored several times, including in the 1950s and 1990s.

Percy French, the Irish composer, once stayed here and composed the song "There's Only One Street In Dromcollogher".

=== Dromcollogher fire ===
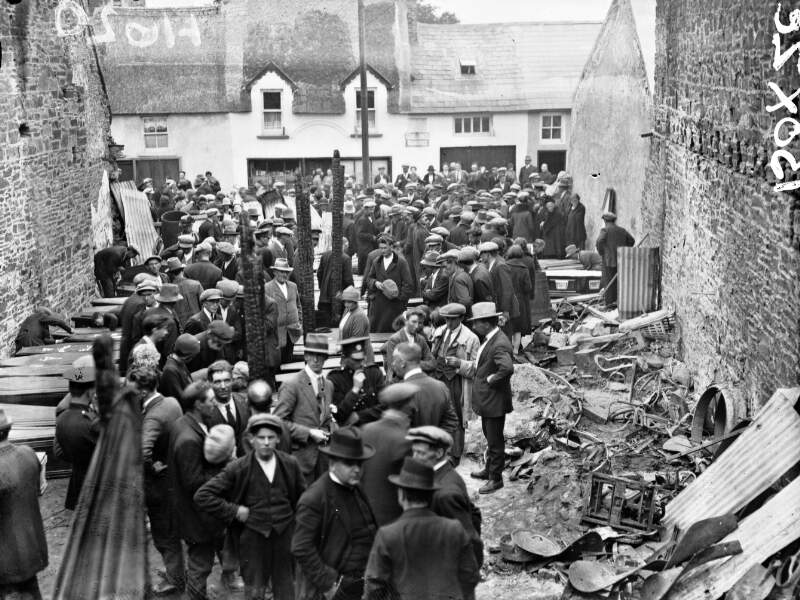
Aftermath of the Dromcollogher fire

On 5 September 1926, a timber barn being used as a temporary cinema in Dromcollogher caught fire when a candle ignited a reel of nitrate film. Forty-eight people died in this tragedy, always known locally as the Dromcollogher Burning; forty-six of them are buried in a large grave in the grounds of the local church.

== Economy ==
Dromcollogher was one of the starting points for the Irish Co-Op Movement, with the first Co-Operative creamery being set up here in 1889 on the initiative of Horace Plunkett. This protected structure was subsequently restored, and was used for a period to house the National Dairy Cooperative Museum.

Since 1962, Dromcollogher has been home to the 'Irish Dresden' pottery factory, which closed its doors in 2009 but re-opened in 2015.

== Sport ==
The local GAA club, Dromcollogher/Broadford GAA, won the 2015 Limerick Junior Hurling Championship. This was the club's second such championship win since Dromcollogher/Broadford joined forces, with the first being in 1993. In 2008, Dromcollogher/Broadford GAA club won the Munster Senior Club Football Championship competition, defeating Kilmurry-Ibrackane from Clare at the Gaelic Grounds.

Dromcollogher-Broadford Ladies football club was founded in 1999. The club has competed in Munster Junior club semi-finals on 3 occasions, and in 2016, competed in its first Munster Junior club final, losing to Kinsale by 4 points.

== Festivals ==
An annual street festival, the Dromcollogher Carnival, is held in early July. Past events have included street entertainment, parades, live music and a 4-mile run.

== See also ==
- List of towns and villages in Ireland
