= Broadford, County Limerick =

Village in County Limerick, Ireland

Broadford Béal an Átha
- Village
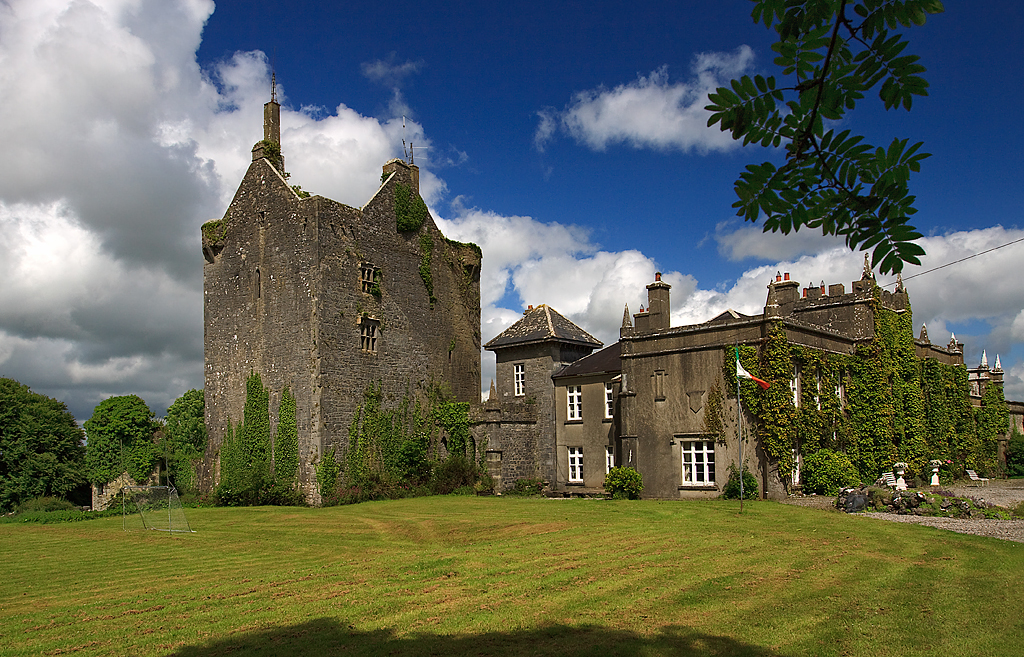
- Springfield Castle

- Location in Ireland
- Coordinates: 52°20′42″N 8°58′27″W
- Country: Ireland
- Province: Munster
- County: County Limerick

Population (2016)
  - Total: 276
- Time zone: UTC+0 (WET)
  - Summer (DST): UTC-1 (IST (WEST))
- Irish Grid Reference: R350220

Broadford (Irish: Béal an Átha - "the mouth of the ford") is a village in the west of County Limerick in Ireland. It is part of the Roman Catholic parish of Dromcollogher-Broadford. In the 2016 census, the resident population of Broadford village was 276, and the population of the Broadford electoral division was 960.

According to records, the village is relatively new, and was first recorded by cartographers in 1837. Prior to its current name, it was known as "Killaliathan" or "Killagholehane". This name derives from Killaliathan Church, located 1.6 km (1 mile) to the south, a medieval church now partially ruined.

== See also ==
- List of towns and villages in Ireland
