= Feohanagh =

Village in County Limerick, Ireland

Feohanagh An Fheothanach
- Village
- Location in Ireland
- Coordinates: 52°23′05″N 8°58′20″W
- Country: Ireland
- Province: Munster
- County: County Limerick
- Time zone: UTC+0 (WET)
  - Summer (DST): UTC-1 (IST (WEST))
- Irish Grid Reference: R310300

Feohanagh (Irish: An Fheothanach, "place of the thistles") is a village and townland in the parish of Mahoonagh in the southwest of County Limerick, Ireland. The village of Feohanagh is 5 miles (8 km) south east of the town of Newcastle West, County Limerick on the R522 regional road to Dromcollogher. It is the only village on that road. Feohanagh townland, which has an area of approximately 4.84 square kilometres (1.87 sq mi), had a population of 89 people as of the 2011 census.
