= Killeedy =

Parish in County Limerick, Ireland

Killeedy Cill Íde
- Civil Parish
- Location in Ireland
- Coordinates: 52°23′00″N 09°04′00″W
- Country: Ireland
- Province: Munster
- County: County Limerick
- Time zone: UTC+0 (WET)
  - Summer (DST): UTC-1 (IST (WEST))
- Website: https://killeedy.ie/

Killeedy (Irish: Cill Íde) is a civil parish located south of Newcastle West in County Limerick, Ireland. This parish consists of two villages, Ashford and Raheenagh. The elevation of the parish varies from 1,184 ft. OS at Mauricetown and 1,082 ft. at Dromdeeveen to 200 ft. OS at Ballintubber. The parish is overlooked by the Mullaghareirk Mountains. The patron saint of Killeedy is Saint Ita. Killeedy used to be known as Cluain Chreadhail but in later ages it had taken the name of Cill íde, the Church of Saint Ita, from a nunnery which was founded there in the sixth century. On 15 January of each year, the feast of St. Ita's Day is celebrated in Killeedy.

== The villages ==
Located in Ashford is St. Ita's Church, a primary school, a Montessori and The Village Inn Pub. The Village Inn pub has had great success in Darts particularly in recent years winning the Desmond Darts League premier division two years in a row. They also host the annual James Kelly Memorial Darts tournament. The soccer pitch for St. Itas AFC is also in Ashford. The Ashford Queen of the West Festival was held during the summers from 1989 and throughout the 1990s as part of the local Gaelic Athletic Association (GAA) club's fund raising activities.

In Raheenagh, there is St Ita's Church, Páirc íde Naofa (the GAA pitch), a primary school, the community centre, a sports complex, a shop, and a pub.

== Sports ==
The sports played competitively in Killeedy are hurling, camogie, Gaelic football and soccer. The local GAA club is Killeedy GAA. The club is heavily concentrated on the game of hurling and camogie with a little Gaelic football also being played. They play in blue and white and their ground is called Páirc Íde Naofa and is located in Raheenagh village. The club has successfully hosted the Munster, Leinster and All-Ireland Junior B Club Hurling Series since 2005.

The Killeedy club has won numerous west and county championships over the years but the pinnacle of their success came in 1980 when they won the County Senior Hurling Championship beating Patrickswell in the final. The following year, Killeedy man Paudie Fitzmaurice (one of the Killeedy Fitzmaurice brothers, along with his brother Willie Fitzmaurice) captained GAA to win the Munster Senior Hurling Championship. Another Killeedy man, Donie Flynn, was joint manager of the Limerick senior hurlers from 1988 to 1991. Killeedy currently compete at the Junior A grade in Limerick.

Saint Ita's AFC are the local soccer club in Killeedy and were founded in 1990, Their pitch is located in Ashford village and they play in blue and white. The junior team competes in the Limerick Desmond League Premier Division. St. Ita's joined at underage level for two seasons with neighboring club Feenagh AFC and went under the moniker of Bluebell United. St. Ita's greatest achievement thus far was their All-Ireland Women's Junior Cup victory in 2006 making them the first Limerick Desmond League side to achieve this. In that same year, their women's team also won the Division 1 title in a playoff against Ballingarry A.F.C. and competed in the first ever Women's Desmond Cup final in which they lost out on penalties to Ballingarry. Their Junior team have had good success also with one of their finest achievements being them reaching the Quarter Final of the Munster Junior Cup in the 2005/06 season where they were beaten by Clonmel Town who would go on to win the competition. As well as this they have won back to back Richard Hogan cups, the Division 2 and Division 3 league titles and the Division 2 league cup. The Junior team made history in the 23/24 season of the Desmond league, when the won promotion to the premier division as runners up of Division 1 for first time in the clubs history.

== Landmarks and history ==
- Field Marshal Count Peter Lacy (Irish: Peadar Piarais Éamonn de Lása) was born in Killeedy in 1678. After fighting at the Siege of Limerick in 1691, he emigrated first to France with the Wild Geese, then to the Holy Roman Empire, and finally to Russia under Tsar Peter the Great. There, he became a Field Marshal in the Imperial Russian Army and served as governor of Livonia. His son Franz Moritz (Francis Maurice) von Lacy was a Field Marshal in Austrian service.
- Tadhg Gaelach Ó Súilleabháin (c. 1715 – 1795), a highly important composer of Christian poetry and Irish bardic poetry in Munster Irish, was also a native of Killeedy.
- In 1916, Thomas Shaughnessy was created the 1st Baron Shaughnessy of the City of Montreal in the Dominion of Canada and of Ashford (in Killeedy) in the County of Limerick. His father Tom Shaughnessy, who was a policeman and detective in Milwaukee, Wisconsin was a native of Ashford in Killeedy.
- Notable historic landmarks in Killeedy include St. Ita's Monastery and Cemetery, Killeedy Castle, the Mass Rock, Glenduff Castle, Glenquin Castle, Lough O'Ge and Ballagh Post Office.
