= Ballyguyroe =

Coordinates: 52°15′26″N 8°30′07″W

Ballyguyroe (Irish Baile an Ghaill Rua, Town of the Red Foreigner/Frenchman/Norman. Spellings also in use: Ballinguyroe and Ballinguiroe. Pronounced locally as "Ballinguyroo"), North and South are rural townlands of Farahy in the southern foothills of the Ballyhoura Mountains in north County Cork, Ireland.

The local economy is largely agriculture and forestry.

The area came into prominence as the proposed location by the Greenstar company for its planned dump - a proposal defeated by the locality at An Bord Pleanála in 2004 and 2008.
