= Carrigeenamronety Hill =

Hill and ecological site in the Ballyhoura Mountains, Ireland

- Irish: Cnoc Charraigín na mBróinte
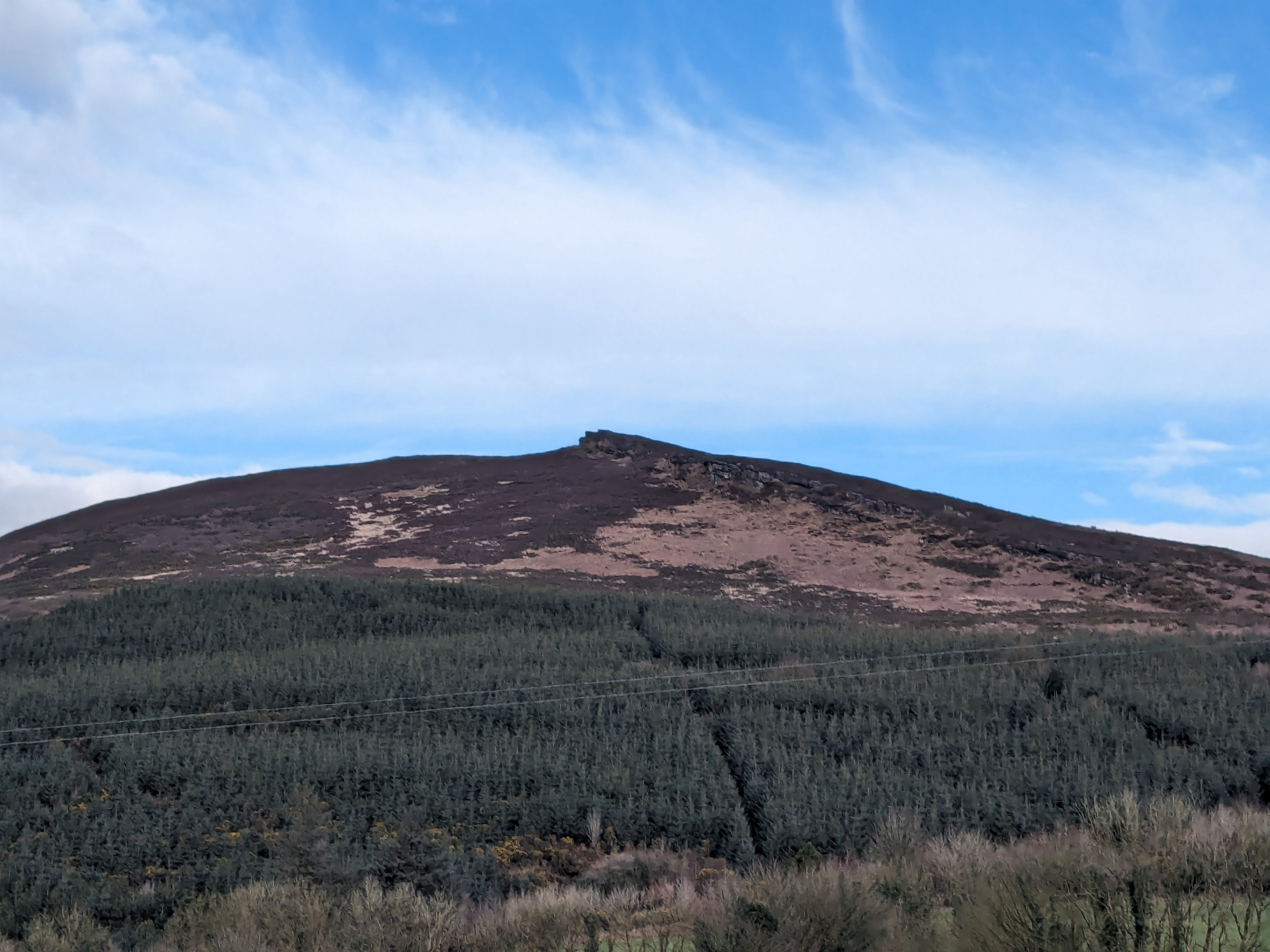

- Location within Ireland
- Location: County Limerick and County Cork, Ireland
- Nearest city: Ballyorgan, County Limerick
- Coordinates: 52°17′39″N 8°26′13″W
- Area: 94.75 hectares (234.1 acres)
- Governing body: National Parks and Wildlife Service

Carrigeenamronety Hill (Irish: Cnoc Charraigín na mBróinte, meaning 'little rock of the mill-stones/quernstones') Special Area of Conservation or SAC is a Natura 2000 site in the Ballyhoura Mountains, Ireland. The qualifying interests for which it is protected as an SAC are the presence of the Killarney fern and the presence of a dry heath habitat.

Carrigeenamronety is a hill with elevation 400.9 m (1,315 ft) and prominence 226 m (741 ft), and is classed as a Marilyn. The summit is in County Limerick.

== SAC qualification ==
The Carrigeenamronety Hill site was designated as a Natura 2000 site in 1998 under the Habitats Directive. Statutory Instrument No. 221 of 2017, establishing the site as an SAC (site code: 000397), was passed in 2017. The National Parks and Wildlife Service notes two features which qualify this site for an SAC designation:

- Killarney fern or Trichomanes speciosum (Natura 2000 code 1421)
- Dry heath (Natura 2000 code 4030)

The European Environment Agency website EUNIS notes that the Carrigeenamronety Hill site is protected as a Natura 2000 site due to the presence of two habitat types:

- European dry heaths (Natura 2000 code 4030)
- Northern Atlantic wet heaths with Erica tetralix (Natura 2000 code 4010)

The Biodiversity Information Systems for Europe (BISE) webpage for Carrigeenamronety Hill notes that the site is protected as a Natura 2000 site under the Habitats Directive due to the presence of the Killarney fern (Trichomanes speciosum or Vandenboschia speciosa), and due to the presence of a habitat containing heath and scrub. The Carrigeenamronety Hill site is also a proposed National Heritage Area site or pNHA.

== Location ==
Carrigeenamronety Hill is located close to the village of Ballyorgan, County Limerick. The site includes areas in the townlands of Boleynanoultagh, Gortacurrig (electoral district of Kildorrery) and Graigue (electoral district of Templemolaga) in County Cork and Kilcruaig in County Limerick.

=== Placename ===
Patrick Weston Joyce notes in the 1869 edition of his book The Origin and History of Irish Names of Places, that the name Carrigeenamronety is derived from the ridge of rocks on this hill from which the peasantry would take stones to use as quern-stones. The word bro refers to a quern or hand-mill or to the mill-stones used with water-mills. This gives the area its Irish name of Carraigín-na-mbrointe, or the little rock of the mill-stones. In Weston's 1900 book Atlas and Cyclopedia of Ireland, he refers to this hill as Knockeenamroanta.

From the Historic Environment Viewer website of the National Monuments Service, the hill is also known as Quern Hill: "known locally as Quern Hill or Carrig na mBrónta".

It is also known locally as Kilcruaig Mountain, from the townland name.

== Features ==
The National Parks and Wildlife Service (NPWS) site synopsis for this SAC describes the ecological features of the site. As well as key flora and fauna, the synopsis notes that the underlying geology of the area is Old Red Sandstone and Silurian rocks. An escarpment of conglomerate rock occurs at the summit of the hill.

=== Hill ===
The hill reaches an altitude of 400.9 metres above sea level. On the List of Marilyns in the British Isles, Carrigeenamronety is ranked number 1448, at a height of 401 metres and with a prominence of 226 metres. It is an established walking/cycling track - the Ballyhoura Darragh Hills Loop walk includes Carrigeenamronety and its neighbouring mountain, Carrighenry. The Ballyhoura Way section of the Beara-Breifne Way (commemorating the journey of Donal Cam O'Sullivan Beare from West Cork to Leitrim) passes very close to Carrigeenamronety along the Ballyhoura Mountains.

=== Flora ===
The flora at this site is primarily dry siliceous heath (60%) and wet heath (10%). At the lower altitudes of this mountain site, unimproved grassland of purple moor-grass (Molinia caerulea) is noted, as are areas of improved grassland.

The key flora at this site is the Killarney fern (Trichomanes speciosum). European dry heath, a protected habitat, occurs here. The Killarney fern is a rare plant and is vulnerable to collecting. Monitoring of the species is carried out by the NPWS.

=== Fauna ===
According to the NPWS site synopsis, two bird species listed in the Birds Directive are known to use this site:

- Hen harrier (Circus cyaneus)
- Peregrine falcon (Falco peregrinus)

== Conservation objectives ==
The NPWS conservation objectives for the Carrigeenamronety Hill SAC were published in 2021. In this document, it is noted that, while dry heath is the primary habitat in this SAC, the extent of dry heath at the site has not been recorded in detail. Wet heath also occurs here, as does dry-humid acid grassland. The target for the site is to ensure the area is stable or increasing, with regard to natural processes.

Maintaining appropriate soil pH and nutrient levels is also set as a target, however, the current nutrient levels have not been defined. The deposition of nitrogen at the site is known to be an issue for the site. Maintenance of the dry heath vegetation communities at the site is a target objective, however, the extent of the diversity of dry heath vegetation at the site has not yet been mapped.

Maintenance of the distribution, populations, colonies, population size, infrastructure and other features of the protected Killarney fern is a key objective for the SAC.

=== Threats ===
The Biodiversity Information Systems for Europe webpage for the Carrigeenamronety Hill site notes three threats and pressures to the site:

- Fire and fire suppression (high)
- Artificial planting on open ground (non-native trees) (medium)
- Walking, horseriding and non-motorised vehicles (medium)

The NPWS site synopsis for the site notes that conifer planting for commercial afforestation is a significant threat at this SAC.

== Archaeology ==
The Historic Environment Viewer of the National Monuments Service includes records of the archaeology to be found on Carrigeenamronety Hill. The records (with their National Monument record numbers) include:

- Millstone quarry (CO009-005003-)
- Mass rock (CO009-005002)
- Enclosure/'lios' (LI059-006----) and (CO009-005001-)

The millstone quarry area is to be found on the southern slope of the hill, crossing the Cork-Limerick county border (in Boleynanoultagh and Gortacurrig townlands). The record for the site notes that there are several sandstone outcrops at this site. Areas where quarrying took place were to be seen here, including hollows where conglomerate millstones had been extracted, and partially completed millstones still in place. The record for this monument notes that Carrigeenamronety Hill is also known as Quern Hill or Carrig na mBrónta.

There is a mass rock situated on a south-facing slope of the site (in Boleynanoultagh townland), consisting of a rectangular slab of sandstone rock, with supporting stones. The slab is 0.7 x 0.78 x 0.12 m, with a cross carved into the south face.

There are two records of enclosures at Carrigeenamronety, referring to the same structure. Records LI059-006 and CO009-005001- refer to an enclosure which was recorded in 1984 as consisting of a circular area approximately 2.5 metres above the surrounding area. It is 34 metres in diameter. There are "undulations" around the edge of the interior of the structure, and it is suggested these may be the remains of an enclosing bank. It is known locally as the "lios".

The neighbouring hill, Carrighenry, has a hillfort on its summit, called Castlegale Hillfort (National Monument record number LI059A001----) It is approximately 120 metres (1.6 hectares) in diameter. The National Monuments record notes that it is known as "the Citadel". On the west side of the summit, the fort is bounded by a sandstone cliff of approximately 6–7 metres. The rest of this enclosure consists of a double ring of dump constructed stone bank material. These lines are approximately 2 m in height and 5 m in width. The Atlas of Hillforts of Britain and Ireland records this fort as having a stone cairn at the highest point within the hillfort. This is considered to be the remains of a post-medieval tower.

== History ==
The gap between Carrigeenamronety Hill and its neighbouring hill Coolfree or Knockea is known as Bearna Dhearg (Barnadarg, or the "red gap" in English), or Red Chair (or Richchair/Redsherd). This is reputed to be where Mahon or Mathgamain mac Cennétig, King of Cashel and Munster and the brother of Brian Boru, was killed by armed men under the instruction of Ivar of Limerick the Dane, Máel Muad mac Brain (or Molloy king of Desmond) and Donnubán mac Cathail Donovan king of Hy Carbery (other possible locations for this execution include Mushera Mountain/Musheramore in Cork and Aghabullogue near Macroom). In the except below, Carrigeenamronety (Carraigín na mBróinte in its original Irish name) is described phonetically as "Corrig-na-Brontha."

Not so, however, the next pass intersecting the range of hills just alluded to, namely, that of Barna Dearg, or the Red Gap, one of the most celebrated, in story, of all the passes leading into South Munster. From a small hamlet, about half a mile on the north, or LImerick side of the gap, it is frequently called the pass of Red Chard, or corruptly Red Chair. The hill to the west of it is Knockea, and that to the east Slieve Caoin; although from the names of the townlands along their base, the former is known by the peasantry, on the Limerick side, as Coolfree, and the latter as Kilcruig and Corrig-na-Brontha. Here then we have the Slieve Caoin of the bards and seannachies, and the Mons Kea of the tripartite life of St. Patrick, according to Colgan; and between them Barna Dearg, so often the scene of a bloody contest, and so often traversed by hostile bands, penetrating to the fertile banks of the Funcheon and the Blackwater on the one side, or advancing towards the rich plains of Cashel, or Hy Figeinte on the other. It was to this gap, or some place near it, as well as the data enable us to judge, that Mahon, the elder brother of Brian Boru, was taken to be murdered, when fell a victim to the conspiracy of Molloy, king of Desmond, Donovan, king of Hy Figeinte, and Ivar, king of the Danes of Limerick.

The Annals of the Four Masters, translated into English by O'Donovan in 1856, describes the capture and execution of Mathgamhain (or Mahon) in 976 AD. One version of the story places the capture of Mahon at Bruree in County Limerick, and the execution at a place called Bearna-dhearg, which is likely to refer to the gap of Red Chair between Carraigeenamronety Hill and Coolfree Mountain: "It is a chasm lying between the hills of Kilcruaig and Red-Chair; the former on the east and the latter on its west side. The high road from Limerick passes through it."

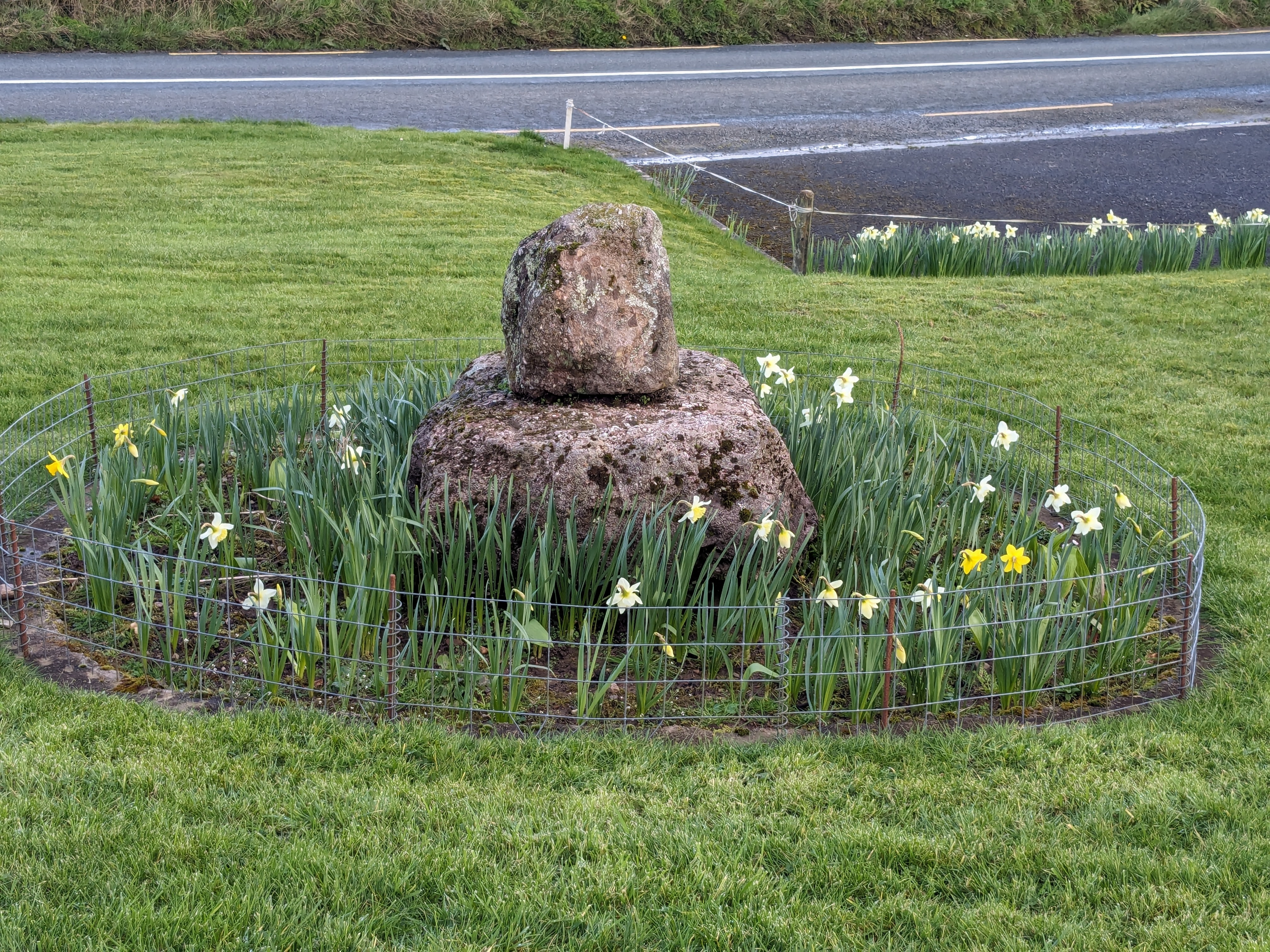
A stone at Red Chair, on the Limerick-Cork border, marking the point where Mahon reputedly fell

== Folklore ==
From the Dúchas Schools Collection of the Irish Folklore Commission, one story, recorded in 1937-1938 from Kildorrery, notes that Carrigeenamronety was where the brother of the "evil spirit" or witch Petticoat Loose lived. According to the story, she herself lived in a place called Laba-Cally (likely Labbacallee wedge tomb near Glanworth in County Cork, (Irish: Leaba Chaillí, meaning 'hag's bed, where a 'hag' or evil spirit lived') When her brother wanted to smoke the pipe, Petticoat Loose would throw it from Laba-Cally to Carrigeenamronety, and when she wanted it back, her brother would throw it back to her.

Another version of this story occurs in the Schools Collection, where there is a cave called Seomra Nóra (or "Nora's room" in English). An old hag called Nóra - a chieftain's daughter - lived there with her husband. In this version of the story, Nóra is the sister of the hag at Labbacallee, and they hand each other the pipe as required across this great distance. There is indeed an area called Seomra Nóra at this site.
