= Ballyorgan, County Limerick =

Village in County Limerick, Ireland

Ballyorgan Baile Uí Argáin
- Village
- Location in Ireland
- Coordinates: 52.318169°N 8.4695944°W
- Country: Ireland
- Province: Munster
- County: Limerick
- Dáil Éireann: Limerick County
- Dialling code: 063

Ballyorgan (Irish: Baile Uí Argáin) is a small village situated in County Limerick. The name of the village in Irish corresponds to the town of Horgan or Ó hArgáin (Baile: town and Uí Argáin: Organ or Horgan, a person’s name).

== Location ==
The village of Ballyorgan is located in the south-east of County Limerick, approximately 49 kilometres from Limerick city. The closest town to it is Kilfinane. It is situated on the Keale River, which is part of the Blackwater catchment. The Keale River joins the Funshion river, which then joins the Blackwater. The village sits at the base of the Ballyhoura Mountains, below Seefin, the Long Mountain and Coolfree Mountain. The area is of ecological interest, being in close proximity to two Special Areas of Conservation (Ballyhoura Mountains and Carrigeenamronety Hill, and including the proposed Natural Heritage Area of Castleoliver Woods (Site code 002090).

== History ==
=== The Palatines ===
Ballyorgan village has a long association with the Palatines who emigrated from the Rhine Palatine in the late 16th century. When the Palatines left Germany in 1709, many of the families came to Ireland, and Ballyorgan was one of the areas of County Limerick in which they settled. Silver Oliver, the owner of the Castle Oliver estate, invited Palatine families from the nearby estate of Castle Matrix (in Rathkeale) to his extensive estate, and had houses built to accommodate some Palatine families. Some of these houses still remain at Ballyorgan and the neighbouring village of Glenosheen. Palatine families lived at the Oliver estate from 1759, and the village of Ballyorgan was established by and for some of these families. In the same area, many families also settled at Glenosheen and Ballyriggin. Lewis notes that the families came to the parish of Kilflyn (population 1,562) in 1740, and prior to their arrival, the area was uncultivated. In the existing fragments of the 1821 Irish census, it was noted that Silver Oliver, who (it was stated) established Ballyorgan with the purpose of making freeholders, gave 7 acres of arable land to each freehold along with rights to the mountain and that Ballyorgan included 53 houses (48 occupied) at that time.

In 1812, Kilflyn church was built as a place of worship for the Protestant congregation of Ballyorgan and surrounds. It was situated adjacent to Ballyorgan village in the townland of Ballydonoghue, on what had been the site of a 6th century church dedicated to a St Finnian (or St Flann) and then a 13th century Trinitarian monastery (Ballyorgan Friary). The chancel window of this church bears the coat of arms of the Oliver-Gascoigne family of Castle Oliver. Castle Oliver itself lies between the villages of Ballyorgan and Glenosheen, and one of the gate lodges to the castle (the west or Ballyorgan gate) is located at the north end of Ballyorgan village. The other gate is to the east of the castle. Other interesting examples of architecture in the area include Waterloo House, once the glebe house or rectory for the area (Ballyorgan Glebe or Kilflyn Rectory), and the Roman Catholic Church on the main street of the village which dates from 1857.

=== Dominican Abbey ===
A short distance from Ballyorgan village is a graveyard situated beside the ruins of a Dominican friary. The graveyard and townland are called Abbey in English; in Irish, the townland is called An Mhainistir, Mainistir Bhaile na nGall or Mainistir na nGall corresponding to 'the monastery of (the town of) the standing stones’ or possibly the monastery of (the town of) the strangers. Begley’s work on history of the diocese of Limerick names it 'Ballinegaul'.

The original abbey was understood to date from the 7th or 8th century. A Dominican house was established by the 14th century, which was later suppressed. Begley notes conflicting descriptions of the abbey, as a Dominican priory and Black Friars (Braher duffe) and also as a priory of the White Friars (or Carmelites). It is noted as a Dominican foundation and a cell of the Dominican Abbey in nearby Kilmallock (Kilmallock Abbey) in O’Sullivan’s Medieval Irish Dominican Studies. Stories of the destruction of the Abbey are found in the Irish Schools Collection of folklore from the area documented in the 1930s by the Irish Folklore Commission.

=== O’Sullivan Beare ===
The Beara-Breifne Way, the journey commemorating the march taken by Donal Cam O'Sullivan Beare with 400 soldiers and 600 civilians after the Battle of Kinsale, passes through Ballyorgan (the Ballyhoura Way) and through the Galtee Mountains.

== Glenroe-Ballyorgan Catholic parish ==
Ballyorgan village and townland is located in the parish of Glenroe-Ballyorgan, which is in the barony of Coshlea. There are two Roman Catholic churches in Glenroe-Ballyorgan parish, one in Glenroe (built 1830-1832), and one in Ballyorgan (built 1857, replacing a thatched mass house).

== Hillwalking ==
Ballyorgan is located in the Ballyhoura Fáilte heartland. It includes several established walking trails, and is one of the sites involved in the Ballyhoura Walking Festival.

== Notable people ==
The historian and author Patrick Weston Joyce was born in the townland of Ballyorgan in 1827 (his brother Robert Dwyer Joyce was born in the neighbouring village of Glenosheen).

== See also ==
- List of towns and villages in Ireland
- List of townlands of County Limerick
- List of monastic houses in County Limerick
