= Patrick Weston Joyce =

Irish historian

P. W. Joyce SPIL, RSAI
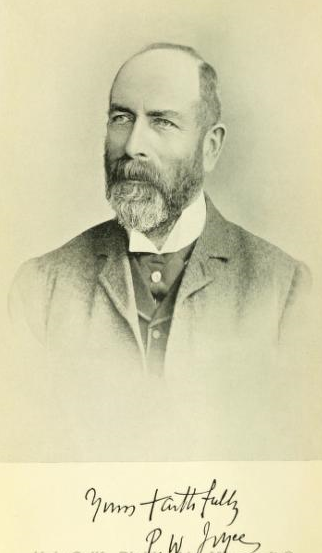
- Dr. P. W. Joyce
- Born: 1827; Ballyorgan, County Limerick, Ireland
- Died: 7 January 1914 (aged 86); Dublin, Ireland
- Education: Trinity College Dublin
- Occupations: author, historian
- Relatives: Robert Dwyer Joyce, Seán Mór Seoighe
- Writing career
- Subjects: Irish place names, root words, literature, folklore
- Notable works: The Origin and History of Irish Names of Places; A Social History of Ancient Ireland

Patrick Weston Joyce (1827 – 7 January 1914) was an Irish historian, writer and music collector, known particularly for his research in Irish etymology and local place names of Ireland.

== Biography ==
He was born in Ballyorgan in the Ballyhoura Mountains, on the borders of counties Limerick and Cork in Ireland, and grew up in nearby Glenosheen. The family claimed descent from one Seán Mór Seoighe (fl. 1680), a stonemason from Connemara, County Galway.

Robert Dwyer Joyce was a younger brother. Joyce was a native Irish speaker who started his education at a hedge school. He then attended school in Mitchelstown, County Cork.

Joyce started work in 1845 with the Commission of National Education. He became a teacher and principal of the Model School, Clonmel. In 1856 he was one of fifteen teachers selected to re-organize the national school system in Ireland. Meanwhile he earned his B.A. in 1861 and M.A. in 1863 from Trinity College, Dublin.

He was principal of the Training College, Marlborough Street, in Dublin from 1874 to 1893. As a member of the Society for the Preservation of the Irish Language he wrote an Irish Grammar in 1878. He was President of the Royal Society of Antiquaries of Ireland from 1906 to 1908, an association of which he was a member from 1865.

Joyce was a key cultural figure of his time. His wide interests included the Irish language, Hiberno-English, music, education, Irish literature and folklore, Irish history and antiquities, place-names and much else. He produced many works on the history and culture of Ireland. His most enduring work is the pioneering The Origin and History of Irish Names of Places (first edition published in 1869). He was a member of the Royal Irish Academy.

== Collection at St. Patrick's College ==
The P.W. Joyce collection at the Cregan Library in St Patrick's College, Drumcondra, Dublin, reflects many of Joyce's interests and includes several rarities. These include autographed presentation copies by Joyce and his brother Robert, as well as books from Joyce's own library. The collection also contains nine manuscripts associated with Joyce and his family members, including a manuscript in P.W. Joyce's own hand of Echtra Cormaic itir Tairngiri agus Ceart Claíd Cormaic (Adventures of Cormac in the Land of Promise), a passage from the Book of Ballymote, which Joyce translated into English.

Nearby Joyce Road in Drumcondra was named after him.

== Select works ==
- The Origin and History of Irish Names of Places (3 volumes, 1869, 1875, 1913)
- Irish Local Names Explained (1870)
- Ancient Irish Music (1873), with piano accompaniments by John William Glover (1815–1899)
- A Handbook of School Management (1876)
- An Irish Grammar (1878)
- On the Old Celtic Romances (1879)
- Old Irish Folk Music, 842 airs, partly from the Forde and Pigot collections (1909)
- Irish Peasant Songs
- Irish Music and Song (1888)
- A Concise History of Rome: From the Foundation of Rome to the Death of Trajan, 117 A.D.
- A Concise History of Ireland
- A History of Gaelic Ireland from the Earliest Times to 1608 (1893)
- English as We Speak it in Ireland (1910)
- Ireland's Battles and Battlefields
- [Irish Names of Places]
- Old Irish Folk Music and Songs
- A Social History of Ancient Ireland, 2 vols. (1906)
- The Story of Ancient Irish Civilisation (1907)
- The Wonders of Ireland (1911)

== Bibliography ==
- Margaret Drabble (ed.), The Oxford Companion of English Literature (Oxford: Oxford University Press, 1985)
- Seamus Deane (ed.), The Field Day Anthology of Irish Writing (Derry: Field Day, 1991), vol. 2
