= Carron Mountain =

Mountain in Ireland

- Carn Fhearadaigh
- Location within Ireland

Highest point
- Elevation: 440 m (1,440 ft)
- Prominence: 75 m (246 ft)
- Coordinates: 52.310°N 8.574°W

Geography
- Location: County Limerick and County Cork, Ireland
- Parent range: Ballyhoura Mountains

Carron Mountain (Irish: Carn Fhearadaigh) is a mountain 440m high on the border of County Limerick and County Cork, Ireland. It is part of the Ballyhoura Mountains.

Carron is home to the North Cork transmitter for the UPC MMDS service.
