= Knockboy =

Mountain on Cork–Kerry border, Ireland

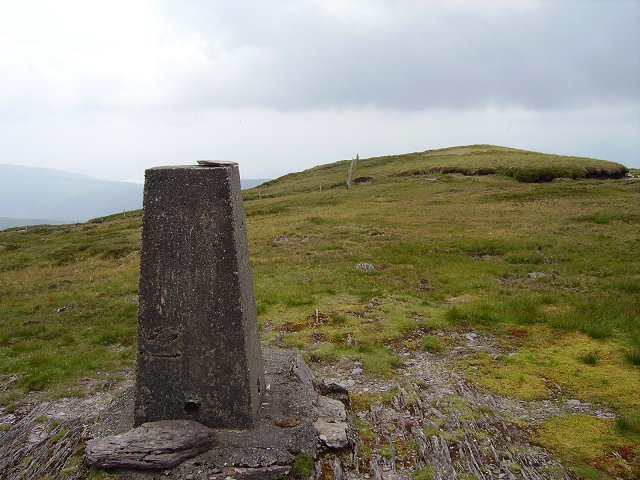

Highest point
- Elevation: 706 m (2,316 ft)
- Prominence: 685 m (2,247 ft)
- Isolation: 11 miles (18 km)
- Listing: County top (Cork), P600, Marilyn, Hewitt
- Coordinates: 51.802°N 9.442°W

Naming
- Native name: An Cnoc Buí
- English translation: Yellow Mountain

Geography
- Location within island of Ireland
- Location: County Cork / Kerry, Ireland
- Parent range: Shehy Mountains
- OSI/OSNI grid: W005620
- Topo map: OSi Discovery 85

Knockboy (Irish: An Cnoc Buí, meaning 'yellow mountain') is a 706-metre-high mountain on the border between counties Cork and Kerry in Ireland.

== Geography ==
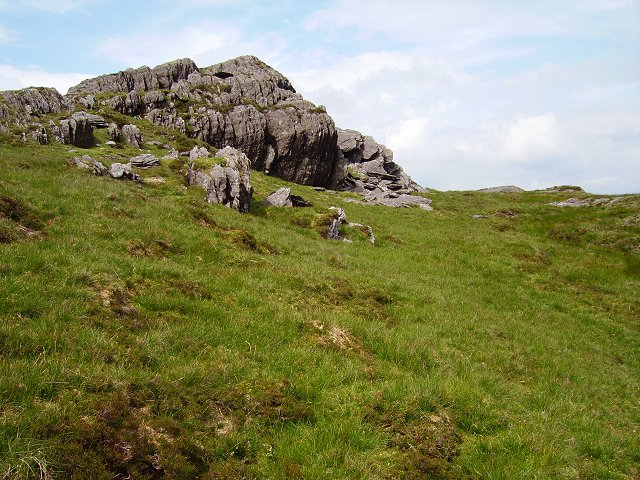
North ridge of Knockboy

Knockboy is the highest peak in the Shehy Mountains and the highest mountain in County Cork with its summit shared with County Kerry. It is the 104th highest peak in Ireland.

== Geology ==
The mountain is composed of sandstone laid down in the Devonian period which was subsequently uplifted to form a mountain range, before being eroded into its present form by glaciers during the last ice age.

== See also ==
- List of Irish counties by highest point
- Lists of mountains in Ireland
- List of mountains of the British Isles by height
- List of P600 mountains in the British Isles
- List of Marilyns in the British Isles
- List of Hewitt mountains in England, Wales and Ireland
