= Shehy Mountains =

Mountain range in Ireland

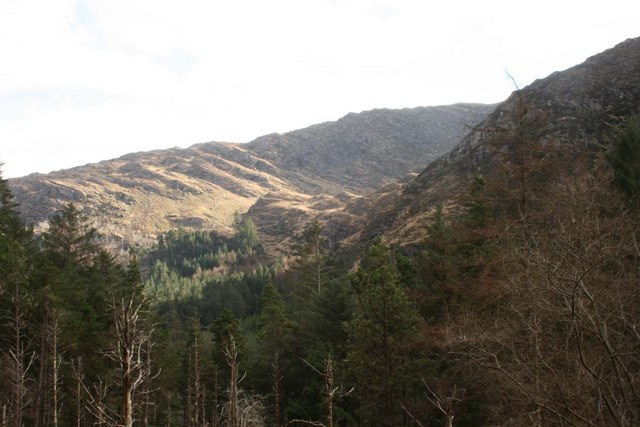
- Shehy Mountains as seen from Gougane Barra

Highest point
- Peak: Knockboy
- Elevation: 706 m (2,316 ft)
- Coordinates: 51°48′8″N 9°26′40″W

Naming
- Native name: Cnoic na Seithe (Irish)

Geography
- Country: Ireland
- Province: Munster
- Counties: Cork; Kerry
- Range coordinates: 51°52′0″N 9°26′34″W
- Borders on: Caha Mountains

Geology
- Rock age: Devonian
- Rock type: Old Red Sandstone

The Shehy Mountains (Cnoic na Seithe in Irish, meaning "Hills of the animal hides") are a range of low mountains situated on the border between County Cork and County Kerry, in Ireland.

== Geography and geology ==
The highest peak (also the highest mountain in County Cork), Knockboy (Cnoc Buí, "yellow hill"), is 706 metres high and most of the other peaks in the range are between 500 and 600 metres high. The River Lee rises in Coomroe, a small valley at the eastern end of the range, before flowing eastwards towards Cork Harbour, where it enters the sea. The peaks mostly consist of Old Red Sandstone laid down in the Devonian period. During the Ice Age, the Shehys took their present form, when glaciers carved out the many deep valleys in the area and also eroded the mountains down to their present height. When the icecaps retreated, they left behind hundreds of lakes in the valleys and on the mountain tops.

== Flora ==
The Shehy Mountains are mostly covered with peat bogs and coarse grassland, but there are also some small conifer plantations scattered around the area. Plants typically found here include butterworts, sundews, heather, and bilberry, among many others.

== Fauna ==
The animal species found in the Shehy Mountains are mostly the same as those found throughout the lowlands, but some are more often seen in the mountains than elsewhere, including:

Mammals

- Irish hare
- Sheep

Birds

- European stonechat
- Raven

== History ==
The area has a very long history of human habitation, going back at least 5000 years. Numerous Neolithic megalithic monuments are found in the foothills and valleys, as well as ringforts, fulachta fia and later antiquities. One of the most historic sites in the Shehy mountains is Gougane Barra in the Coomroe valley, where Saint Finbarr established a hermitage in the 6th century. During the Irish War of Independence, the mountains were an IRA stronghold, and continued to be so for the anti-treaty forces during the Irish Civil War.

== Highest points ==
The following table lists the 5 highest major mountain peaks of the Shehy Mountains, all with a topographic elevation of at least 625 metres (2,050 ft). After the top five, height does not vary much in the Shehy Mountains, with most peaks ranging between 450 and 600 metres.

Rank	Mountain peak	Elevation
1	Knockboy	706 m (2,316 ft)
2	Caoinkeen	692 m (2,270 ft)
3	Knockboy North Top	649 m (2,129 ft)
4	Knocknamanagh	637 m (2,090 ft)
5	Knocknamanagh NE Top	625 m (2,051 ft)

== See also ==
- List of Mountains in Ireland
