= Seefin (Ballyhoura Mountains) =

Mountain in Ireland

- Suí Finn
- Location within Ireland

Highest point
- Elevation: 528 m (1,732 ft)
- Listing: Marilyn
- Coordinates: 52.313°N 8.521°W

Naming
- English translation: Seat of Fionn
- Language of name: Irish

Geography
- Location: County Limerick, Ireland
- Parent range: Ballyhoura Mountains
- OSI/OSNI grid: R644180

Seefin (Irish: Suí Finn) is a mountain near the southern border of County Limerick, Ireland. At 528m (1,732 ft) it is the highest point and the second most northerly summit in the Ballyhoura Mountains and the 396th highest in Ireland. Latitude: 52.313847 Longitude: -8.522738.

== Name ==
The name Suí Finn translates as the Seat of Fionn (Mac Cumhaill). It is so named because, according to tradition, Fionn mac Cumhaill and the Fianna stopped here in their travels around the country.
