= Ballyhoura Mountains =

Mountain range of southwestern Ireland

- Irish: An Sliabh Riabhach
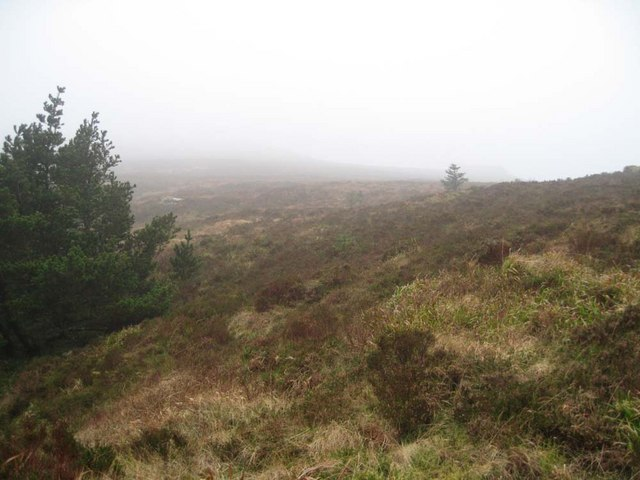
- Black Rock on the Ballyhoura Mountain Range

Highest point
- Peak: Seefin
- Elevation: 528 m (1,732 ft)
- Coordinates: 52°18′N 8°32′W

Geography
- Location within Ireland
- Country: Ireland
- Provinces of Ireland: Munster

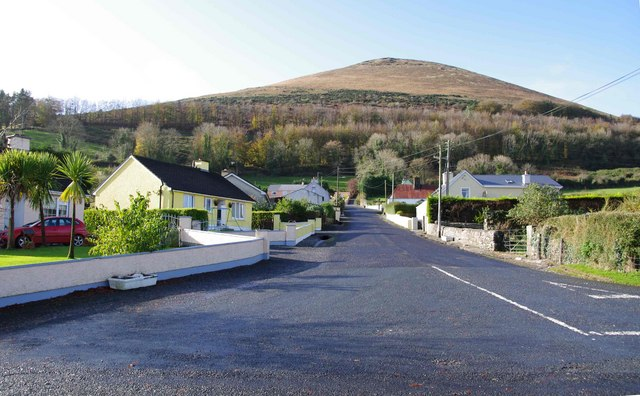
Road approaching the village of Glenosheen, viewed from the R512 junction, with the Ballyhoura mountain range in the background.

The Ballyhoura Mountains (Irish: An Sliabh Riabhach) are in south-east County Limerick and north-east County Cork in central Munster, Ireland, running east and west for about 6 miles on the borders of both counties.

== Name ==
The name 'Ballyhoura' comes from Irish Bealach Abhradh, meaning "Abhradh's pass or way". Their Irish name An Sliabh Riabhach, anglicized 'Slieve Reagh', means "the brindled mountain(s).

== Landscape ==
The mountains include Seefin (528m, 1702 ft), near Seefin on the northwest is Black Rock (516m, 1696 ft) and 3 miles to the west is Carron Mountain (c.440m, 1469 ft) on the boundary of Cork and Limerick. Immediately east of Seefin is Knockea (1311 ft), east of which again is the detached mountain of Knockeennamroanta (or Carrigeenamronety Hill (1319 ft). Between these is the pass of Barnaderg, leading from the plain of Limerick to the plain of Cork. At the north side of the valley is the peak of Barnageeha (1196 ft).

The southern part of the hills is largely afforested with conifer plantations, on the northern side there is extensive heathland and blanket bog. The Ballyhoura Mountains have been listed as a Special Area of Conservation. The blanket bog occurs in most of the flatter areas and features such species as heather (Calluna vulgaris), with deergrass (Trichophorum cespitosum), hare’s-tail cottongrass (Eriophorum vaginatum), common cottongrass (Eriophorum angustifolium), bilberry (Vaccinium myrtillus) and crowberry (Empetrum nigrum). The wet heath is dominated by heather, cross-leaved heath (Erica tetralix) and bilberry accompanied by a range of mosses and liverworts. The dry heath is more species-rich, with bell heather (Erica cinerea), green-ribbed sedge (Carex binervis), tormentil (Potentilla erecta), bent grasses (Agrostis spp.) and mosses such as Hypnum jutlandicum.

== Trails ==
The Ballyhoura Mountain Bike Park situated near under Seefin and Blackrock is the largest Trail network of its kind in Ireland. The trails range from the moderate 6 kilometre Greenwood loop to the demanding 50 kilometre Castlepook loop. The nearest towns and villages to the Trailhead are Ardpatrick, Glenosheen, Ballyorgan and Kilfinnane.

== See also ==
- List of mountains in Ireland
