= County Cork =

County in Ireland

County Cork Contae Chorcaí
- County
- Coat of arms
- Nickname: The Rebel County
- Interactive map of County Cork
- Coordinates: 52°0′N 8°45′W
- Country: Ireland
- Province: Munster
- Region: Southern
- Established: 1606
- County town: Cork

Government
  - Local authority: Cork County Council
  - Dáil constituencies: Cork East; Cork North-Central; Cork North-West; Cork South-Central; Cork South-West
  - EP constituency: South

Area (incl. city)
  - Total: 7,508 km^{2} (2,899 sq mi)
  - Rank: 1st
- Highest elevation (Knockboy): 706 m (2,316 ft)

Population (2022)
  - Total: 584,156
  - Rank: 3rd
  - Density: 77.80/km^{2} (201.5/sq mi)
- Demonym: Corkonian
- Time zone: UTC±0 (WET)
  - Summer (DST): UTC+1 (IST)
- Eircode routing keys: P12, P14, P17, P24, P25, P31, P32, P36, P43, P47, P51, P56, P61, P67, P72, P75, P81, P85, T12, T23, T34, T45, T56 (primarily)
- Telephone area codes: 02x, 063 (primarily)
- ISO 3166 code: IE-CO
- Vehicle index mark code: C
- Website: corkcoco.ie

The island of Ireland, showing location of County Cork.

County Cork (/ˈkɔːrk/, Irish: Contae Chorcaí) is the largest and the southernmost county of Ireland, named after the city of Cork, the country's second-largest city. It is in the province of Munster and the Southern Region. Its largest market towns are Midleton, Mallow, Bandon, Macroom, and Skibbereen. In 2022, the county had a population of 584,156, making it the third-most populous county in Ireland. Cork County Council is the local authority for the county, while Cork City Council governs the city of Cork and its environs. Notable Corkonians include Michael Collins, Jack Lynch, Mother Jones, Roy Keane, Sonia O'Sullivan, Paul O'Donovan, Fintan McCarthy, Rory Gallagher, Fiona Shaw, Cillian Murphy, Jonathan Rhys Meyers and Graham Norton.

Cork borders four other counties: Kerry to the west, Limerick to the north, Tipperary to the north-east and Waterford to the east. The county contains the southern section of the Golden Vale pastureland that extends into the Blackwater valley. The south-west region, including West Cork, is one of Ireland's main tourist destinations, known for its rugged coast and megalithic monuments and as the starting point for the Wild Atlantic Way. The largest third-level institution is University College Cork, founded in 1845, and has a total student population of around 22,000. Local industry and employers include technology company Dell EMC, the European headquarters of Apple, and the farmer-owned dairy co-operative Dairygold.

The county is known as the "rebel county", a name given to it by King Henry VII of England for its support, in a futile attempt at a rebellion in 1491, of Perkin Warbeck, who claimed to be Richard of Shrewsbury, Duke of York.

== Politics and governance ==
The local government areas of county Cork and the city of Cork are administered by the local authorities of Cork County Council and Cork City Council respectively. The boundary between these two areas was altered by the 2019 Cork boundary change. It is part of the Southern Region and has five representatives on the Southern Regional Assembly.

For elections to Dáil Éireann, the city and county are divided into five constituencies: Cork East, Cork North-Central, Cork North-West, Cork South-Central and Cork South-West. Together they return 20 deputies (TDs) to the Dáil. It is part of the South constituency for European elections.

== Geography ==
Cork is the largest county in Ireland by land area, and the largest of Munster's six counties by population and area. At the latest census in 2022, the population of the entire county stood at 584,156. Cork is the second-most populous county in the State, and the third-most populous county on the island of Ireland.

County Cork is located in the province of Munster, bordering Kerry to the west, Limerick to the north, Tipperary to the north-east and Waterford to the east. The county shares separate mountainous borders with Tipperary and Kerry. The terrain on the Kerry border was formed between 360 and 374 million years ago, as part of the rising of the MacGillycuddy's Reeks and Caha Mountains mountains ranges. This occurred during the Devonian period when Ireland was part of a larger continental landmass and located south of the equator. The region's topography of peaks and valleys are characterised by steep ridges formed during the Hercynian period of folding and mountain formation some 300 million years ago.

Twenty-four historic baronies are in the county—the most of any county in Ireland. While baronies continue to be officially defined units, they are no longer used for many administrative purposes. Their official status is illustrated by Placenames Orders made since 2003, where official Irish names of baronies are listed. The county has 253 civil parishes. Townlands are the smallest officially defined geographical divisions in Ireland, with about 5447 townlands in the county.

=== Mountains and upland habitats ===
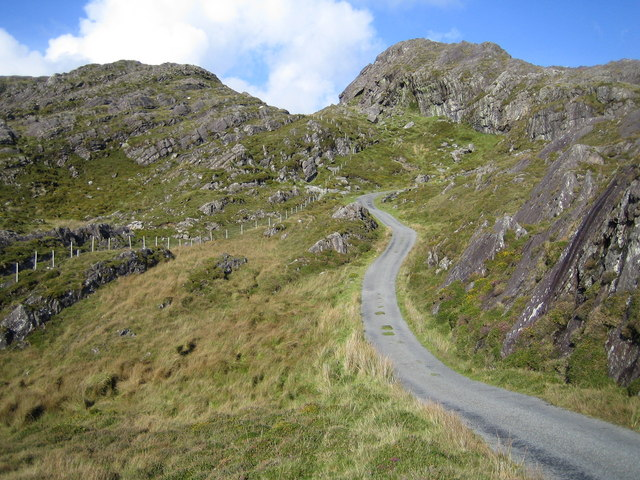
The Beara pass, through the Slieve Miskish mountains

The county's mountains rose during a period mountain formation some 374 to 360 million years ago and include the Slieve Miskish and Caha Mountains on the Beara Peninsula, the Ballyhoura Mountains on the border with Limerick and the Shehy Mountains which contain Knockboy (706 m), the highest point in Cork. The Shehy Mountains are on the border with Kerry and may be accessed from the area known as Priests Leap, near the village of Coomhola.

The upland areas of the Ballyhoura, Boggeragh, Derrynasaggart, and Mullaghareirk Mountain ranges add to the range of habitats found in the county. Important habitats in the uplands include blanket bog, heath, glacial lakes, and upland grasslands. Cork has the 13th-highest county peak in Ireland.

=== Rivers and lakes ===
Three rivers, the Bandon, Blackwater and Lee and their valleys dominate central Cork. Habitats of the valleys and floodplains include woodlands, marshes, fens, and species-rich limestone grasslands. The River Bandon flows through several towns, including Dunmanway to the west of the town of Bandon before draining into Kinsale Harbour on the south coast.

Cork's sea loughs include Lough Hyne and Lough Mahon, and the county also has many small lakes. An area has formed where the River Lee breaks into a network of channels weaving through a series of wooded islands, forming 85 hectares of swampland around Cork's wooded area. The Environmental Protection Agency carried out a survey of surface waters in County Cork between 1995 and 1997, which identified 125 rivers and 32 lakes covered by the regulations.

=== Land and forestry ===
Like many parts of Munster, Cork has fertile agricultural land and many bog and peatlands. Cork has around 74,000 hectares of peatlands, which amount to 9.8% of the county's total land area. Cork has the highest share of the national forest area, with around 90,020 ha (222,400 acres) of forest and woodland area, constituting 11.6% of the national total and approximately 12% of Cork's land area. It is home to one of the last remaining pieces of native woodland in Ireland and Europe.

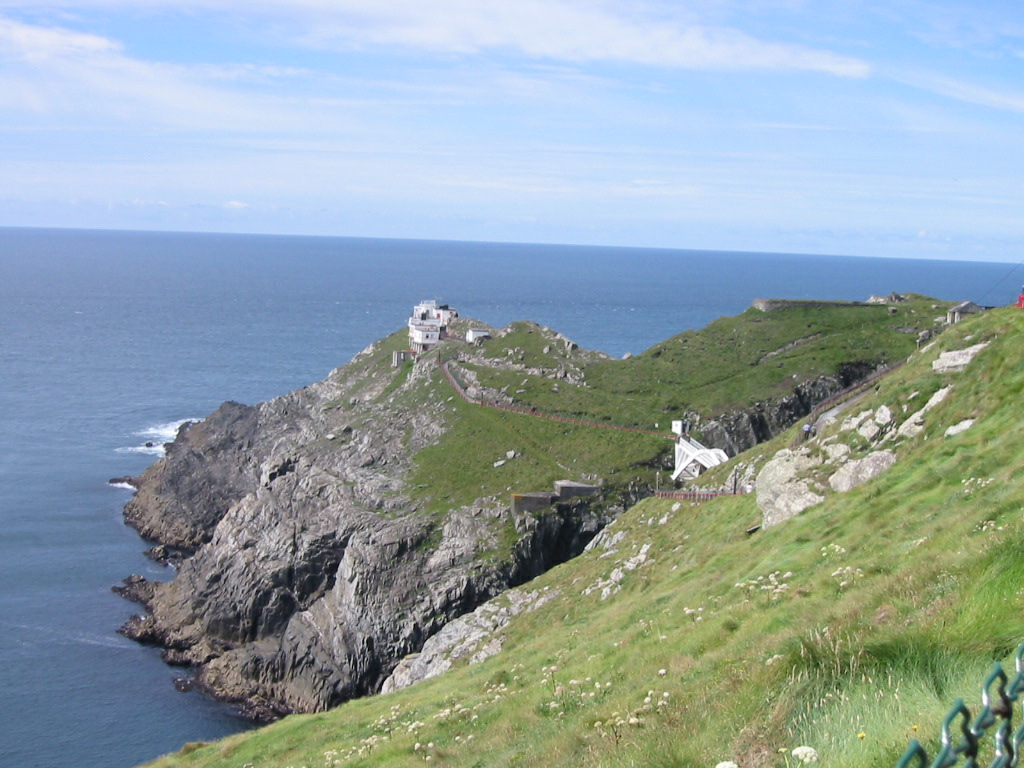
Mizen Head is the most south-westerly point of both Cork and Ireland

=== Wildlife ===
The hooded crow, Corvus cornix is a common bird, particularly in areas nearer the coast. Due to this bird's ability to (rarely) prey upon small lambs, the gun clubs of County Cork have killed many of these birds in modern times. A collection of the marine algae was housed in the herbarium of the botany department of the University College Cork.

Parts of the South West coastline are hotspots for sightings of rare birds, with Cape Clear being a prime location for bird watching. The island is also home to one of only a few gannet colonies around Ireland and the UK. The coastline of Cork is sometimes associated with whale watching, with some sightings of fin whales, basking sharks, pilot whales, minke whales, and other species.

=== Coastline ===
Cork has a mountainous and flat landscape with many beaches and sea cliffs along its coast. The southwest of Ireland is known for its peninsulas and some in Cork include the Beara Peninsula, Sheep's Head, Mizen Head, and Brow Head. Brow Head is the most southerly point of mainland Ireland. There are many islands off the coast of the county, in particular, off West Cork. Carbery's Hundred Isles are the islands around Long Island Bay and Roaringwater Bay.

Fastnet Rock lies in the Atlantic Ocean 11.3 km south of mainland Ireland, making it the most southerly point of Ireland. Many notable islands lie off Cork, including Bere, Great Island, Sherkin, and Cape Clear. With an estimated 1,199 km (745 mi) of coastline, Cork is one of three counties which claims to have the longest coastline in Ireland, alongside Mayo and Donegal. Cork is also one of just three counties to border two bodies of water – the Celtic Sea to the south and the Atlantic Ocean to the west. Cork marks the end of the Wild Atlantic Way, the tourism trail from County Donegal's Inishowen Peninsula to Kinsale.

Average high sea temperature in County Cork
Cork Harbour (Celtic Sea)	Jan	Feb	Mar	Apr	May	Jun	Jul	Aug	Sep	Oct	Nov	Dec	Year
Sea Temperature	11.4 °C (52.5 °F)	10.7 °C (51.3 °F)	10.5 °C (50.9 °F)	12.2 °C (54.0 °F)	12.9 °C (55.2 °F)	15.8 °C (60.4 °F)	18.1 °C (64.6 °F)	17.9 °C (64.2 °F)	17.4 °C (63.3 °F)	16.0 °C (60.8 °F)	13.7 °C (56.7 °F)	12.3 °C (54.1 °F)	14.1 °C (57.4 °F)
Bantry (Atlantic Ocean)	Jan	Feb	Mar	Apr	May	Jun	Jul	Aug	Sep	Oct	Nov	Dec	Year
Sea Temperature	11.6 °C (52.9 °F)	11.2 °C (52.2 °F)	11.0 °C (51.8 °F)	12.1 °C (53.8 °F)	12.8 °C (55.0 °F)	15.6 °C (60.1 °F)	17.6 °C (63.7 °F)	17.5 °C (63.5 °F)	17.3 °C (63.1 °F)	15.8 °C (60.4 °F)	13.8 °C (56.8 °F)	12.2 °C (54.0 °F)	14.0 °C (57.2 °F)

== History ==
Historical population
Year	Pop.	±%
1600	21,889	—
1610	34,250	+56.5%
1653	54,250	+58.4%
1659	63,031	+16.2%
1821	730,444	+1058.9%
1831	810,732	+11.0%
1841	854,118	+5.4%
1851	649,308	−24.0%
1861	544,818	−16.1%
1871	517,076	−5.1%
1881	495,607	−4.2%
1891	438,432	−11.5%
1901	404,611	−7.7%
1911	392,104	−3.1%
1926	365,747	−6.7%
1936	355,957	−2.7%
1946	343,668	−3.5%
1951	341,284	−0.7%
1956	336,663	−1.4%
1961	330,443	−1.8%
1966	339,703	+2.8%
1971	352,883	+3.9%
1979	396,118	+12.3%
1981	402,465	+1.6%
1986	412,735	+2.6%
1991	410,369	−0.6%
1996	420,510	+2.5%
2002	447,829	+6.5%
2006	481,295	+7.5%
2011	519,032	+7.8%
2016	542,868	+4.6%
2022	584,156	+7.6%

The county is colloquially referred to as "The Rebel County", although uniquely Cork does not have an official motto. This name has 15th-century origins, but from the 20th century, the name has been more commonly attributed to the prominent role Cork played in the Irish War of Independence (1919–1921) when it was the scene of considerable fighting. In addition, it was an anti-Treaty stronghold during the Irish Civil War (1922–23). Much of what is now county Cork was once part of the Kingdom of Deas Mumhan (South Munster), anglicised as the "Desmond", ruled by the MacCarthy Mór dynasty.

After the Norman invasion in the 12th century, the McCarthy clan were pushed westward into what is now West Cork and County Kerry. Dunlough Castle, standing just north of Mizen Head, is one of the oldest castles in Ireland (AD 1207). The north and east of Cork were taken by the Hiberno-Norman FitzGerald dynasty, who became the Earls of Desmond. Cork City was given an English Royal Charter in 1318 and for many centuries was an outpost for Old English culture. The Fitzgerald Desmond dynasty was destroyed in the Desmond Rebellions of 1569–1573 and 1579–1583. Much of county Cork was devastated in the fighting, particularly in the Second Desmond Rebellion. In the aftermath, much of Cork was colonised by English settlers in the Plantation of Munster.

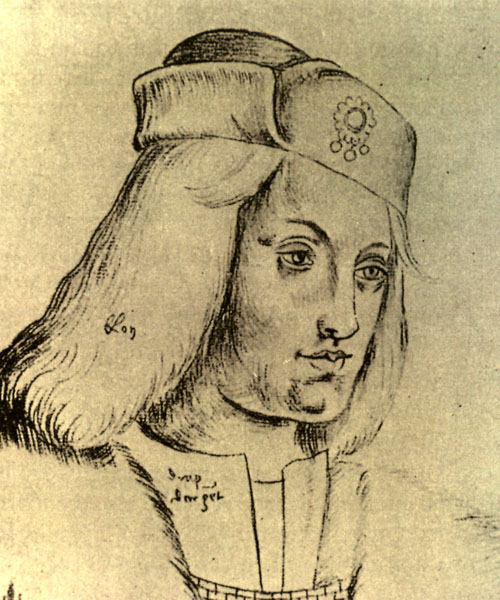
A 15th-century drawing of Perkin Warbeck

In 1491, Cork played a part in the English Wars of the Roses when Perkin Warbeck, a pretender to the English throne spread the story that he was really Richard of Shrewsbury (one of the Princes in the Tower), landed in the city and tried to recruit support for a plot to overthrow King Henry VII of England. The Cork people supported Warbeck because he was Flemish and not English; Cork was the only county in Ireland to join the fight. The mayor of Cork and several important citizens went with Warbeck to England, but when the rebellion collapsed they were all captured and executed. Cork's nickname of the 'rebel county' (and Cork city's of the 'rebel city') originates in these events.

In 1601, the decisive Battle of Kinsale took place in County Cork, which was to lead to English domination of Ireland for centuries. Kinsale had been the scene of the 4th Spanish Armada to help Irish rebels in the Nine Years' War (1594–1603). When this force was defeated, the rebel hopes for victory in the war were all but ended. County Cork was officially created by a division of the older County Desmond in 1606.

In the early 17th century, the townland of Leamcon (near Schull) was a pirate stronghold, and pirates traded easily in Baltimore and Whiddy Island.

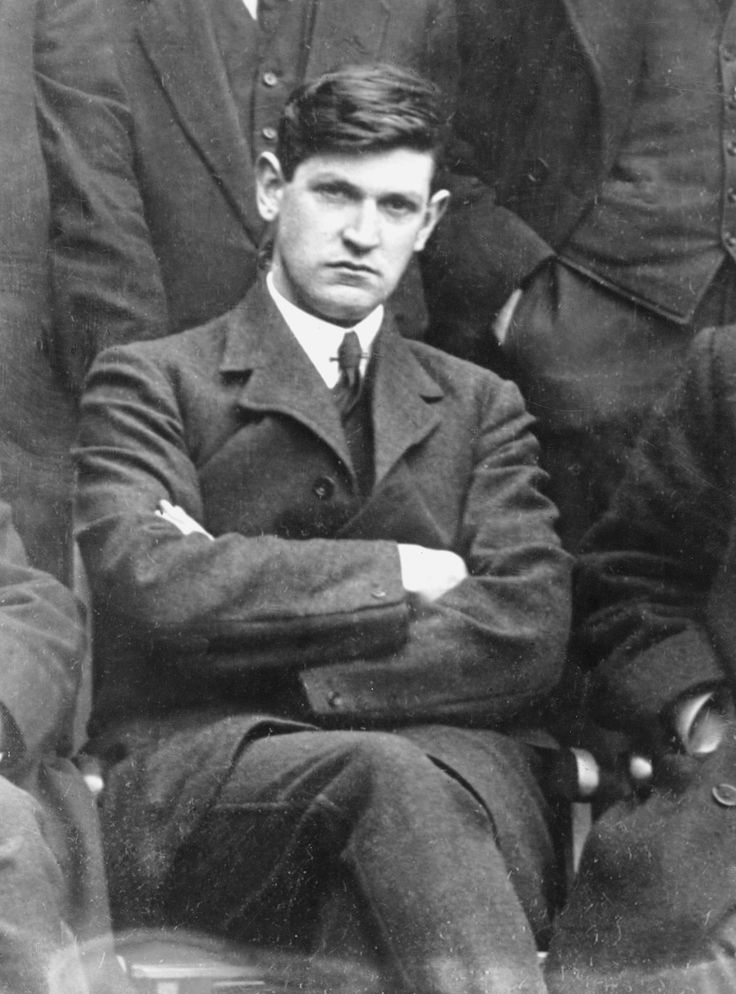
Michael Collins, photographed in 1919

In the 19th century, Cork was a centre for the Fenians and for the constitutional nationalism of the Irish Parliamentary Party, from 1910 that of the All-for-Ireland Party. The county was a hotbed of guerrilla activity during the Irish War of Independence (1919–1921). Three Cork Brigades of the Irish Republican Army operated in the county and another in the city. Prominent actions included the Kilmichael Ambush in November 1920 and the Crossbarry Ambush in March 1921.

The activity of IRA flying columns, such as the one under Tom Barry in west Cork, was popularised in the Ken Loach film The Wind That Shakes The Barley. On 11 December 1920, Cork City centre was gutted by fires started by the Black and Tans in reprisal for IRA attacks. Over 300 buildings were destroyed; many other towns and villages around the county, including Fermoy, suffered a similar fate.

During the Irish Civil War (1922–23), most of the IRA units in Cork sided against the Anglo-Irish Treaty. From July to August 1922 they held the city and county as part of the so-called Munster Republic. However, Cork was taken by troops of the Irish Free State in August 1922 in the Irish Free State offensive, which included both overland and seaborne attacks. For the remainder of the war, the county saw sporadic guerrilla fighting until the Anti-Treaty side called a ceasefire and dumped their arms in May 1923. Michael Collins, a key figure in the War of Independence, was born near Clonakilty and assassinated during the civil war in Béal na Bláth, both in west Cork.

== Irish language ==
County Cork has two Gaeltacht areas in which the Irish language is the primary medium of everyday speech. These are Múscraí (Muskerry) in the north of the county, especially the villages of Cill Na Martra (Kilnamartyra), Baile Bhúirne (Ballyvourney), Cúil Aodha (Coolea), Béal Átha an Ghaorthaidh (Ballingeary), and Oileán Chléire (Cape Clear Island).

There are 14,829 Irish language speakers in County Cork, with 3,660 native speakers in the Cork Gaeltacht. In 2011, there were 6,273 pupils attending the 21 Gaelscoileanna and six Gaelcholáistí all across the county. In 2006, there were 4,896 people in the county who identified as daily Irish speakers outside of the education system. The village of Ballingeary is a centre for Irish language tuition, with a summer school, Coláiste na Mumhan, or the College of Munster.

== Anthem ==
The song "The Banks of My Own Lovely Lee" is traditionally associated with the county. It is sometimes heard at GAA and other sports fixtures involving the county.

== Media ==
Several media publications are printed and distributed in County Cork. These include the Irish Examiner (formerly the Cork Examiner) and its sister publication The Echo (formerly the Evening Echo). Local and regional newspapers include the Carrigdhoun, the Cork Independent, The Corkman, the Mallow Star, the Douglas Post, the East Cork Journal and The Southern Star. Local radio stations include Cork's 96FM and dual-franchise C103, Red FM, and a number of community radio stations, such as CRY 104.0FM.

== Places of interest ==
Tourist sites include the Blarney Stone at Blarney Castle, Blarney. The port of Cobh in County Cork was the point of embarkation for many Irish emigrants travelling to Australia, Canada, New Zealand, South Africa or the United States. Cobh (at the time named 'Queenstown') was the last stop of the RMS Titanic before it departed on its fated journey.

Fota Wildlife Park, on Fota Island, is also a tourist attraction. Nearby is Fota House and Gardens and the Fota Golf Club and Resort; a European Tour standard golf course which hosted the Irish Open in 2001, 2002 and 2014.

West Cork is known for its rugged natural environment, beaches and social atmosphere, and is a common destination for British, German, French and Dutch tourists.

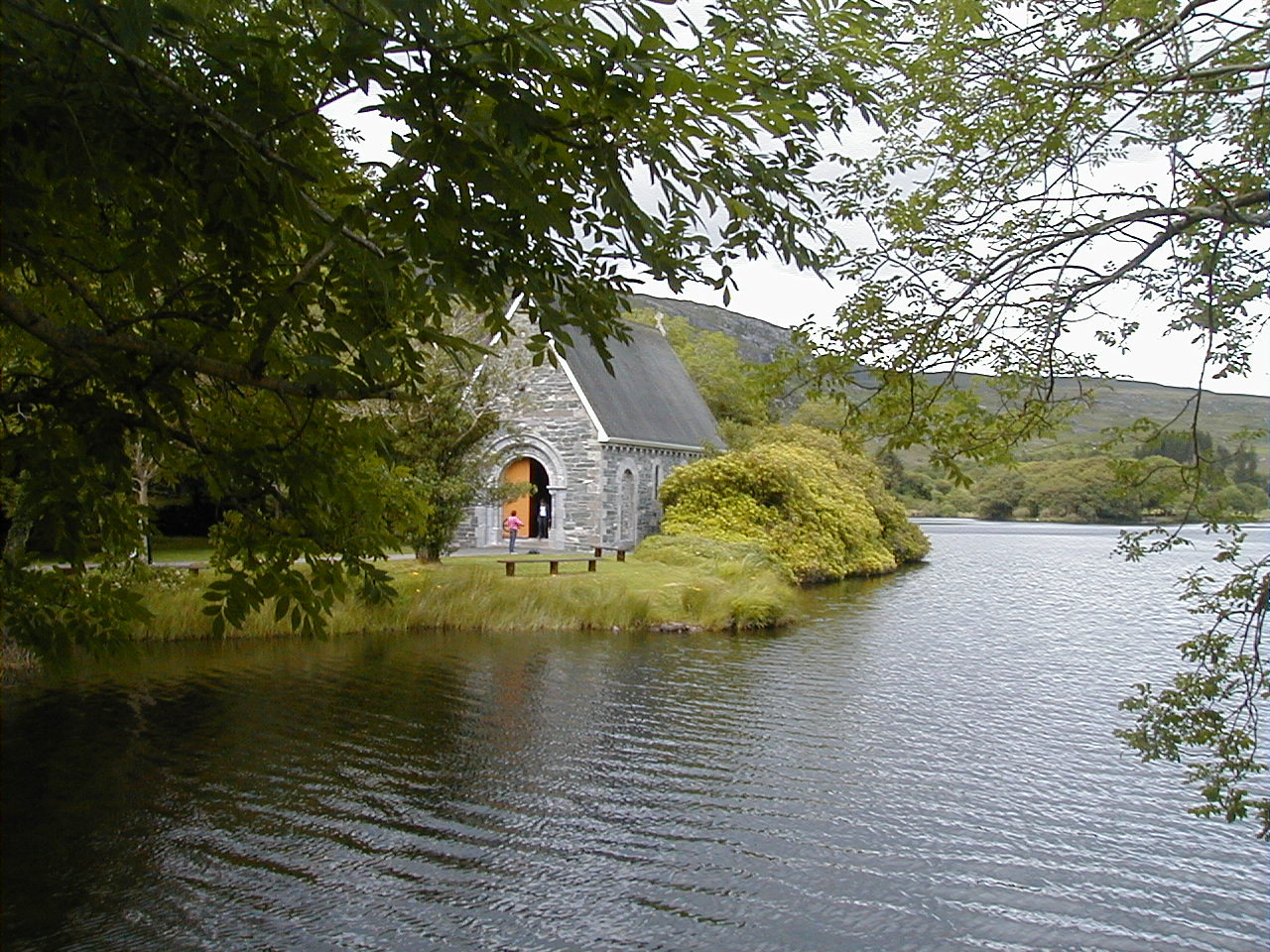
St Finbar's church, located on Gougane Barra, a 6th century monastery site.

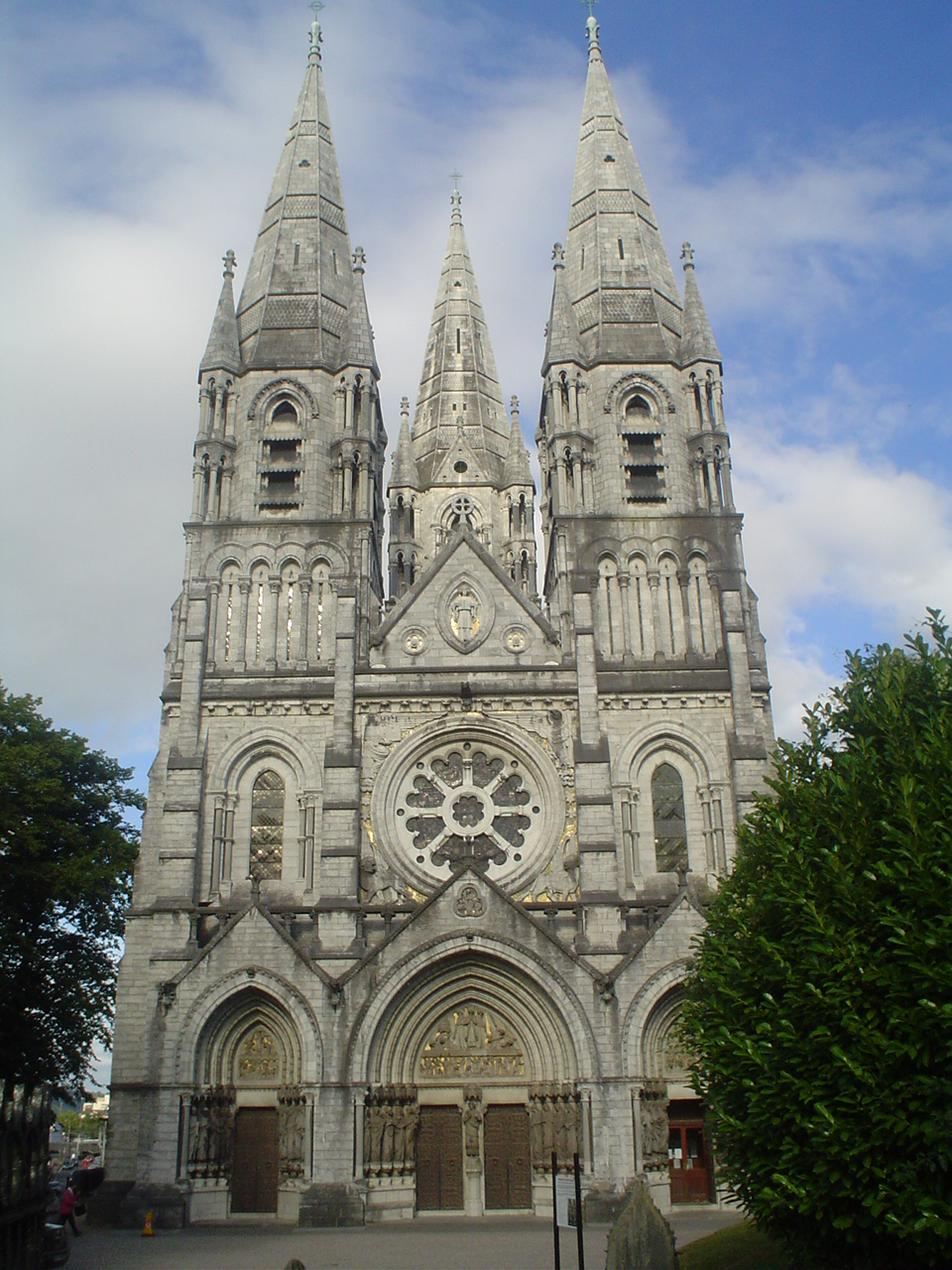
Saint Fin Barre's Cathedral, Cork city. Founded in 1879 on a 7th-century site.

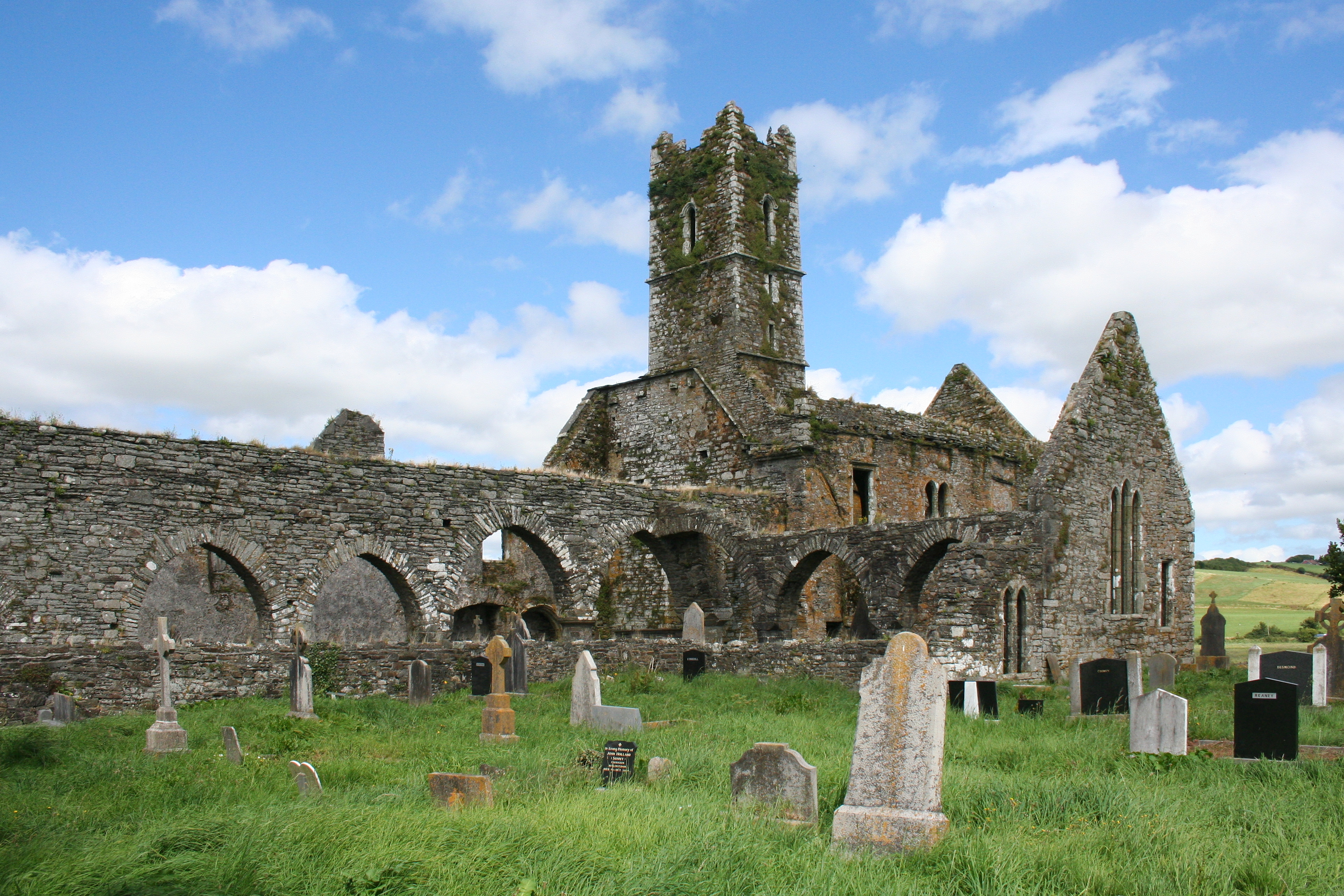
Timoleague Friary, West Cork. Founded 1240

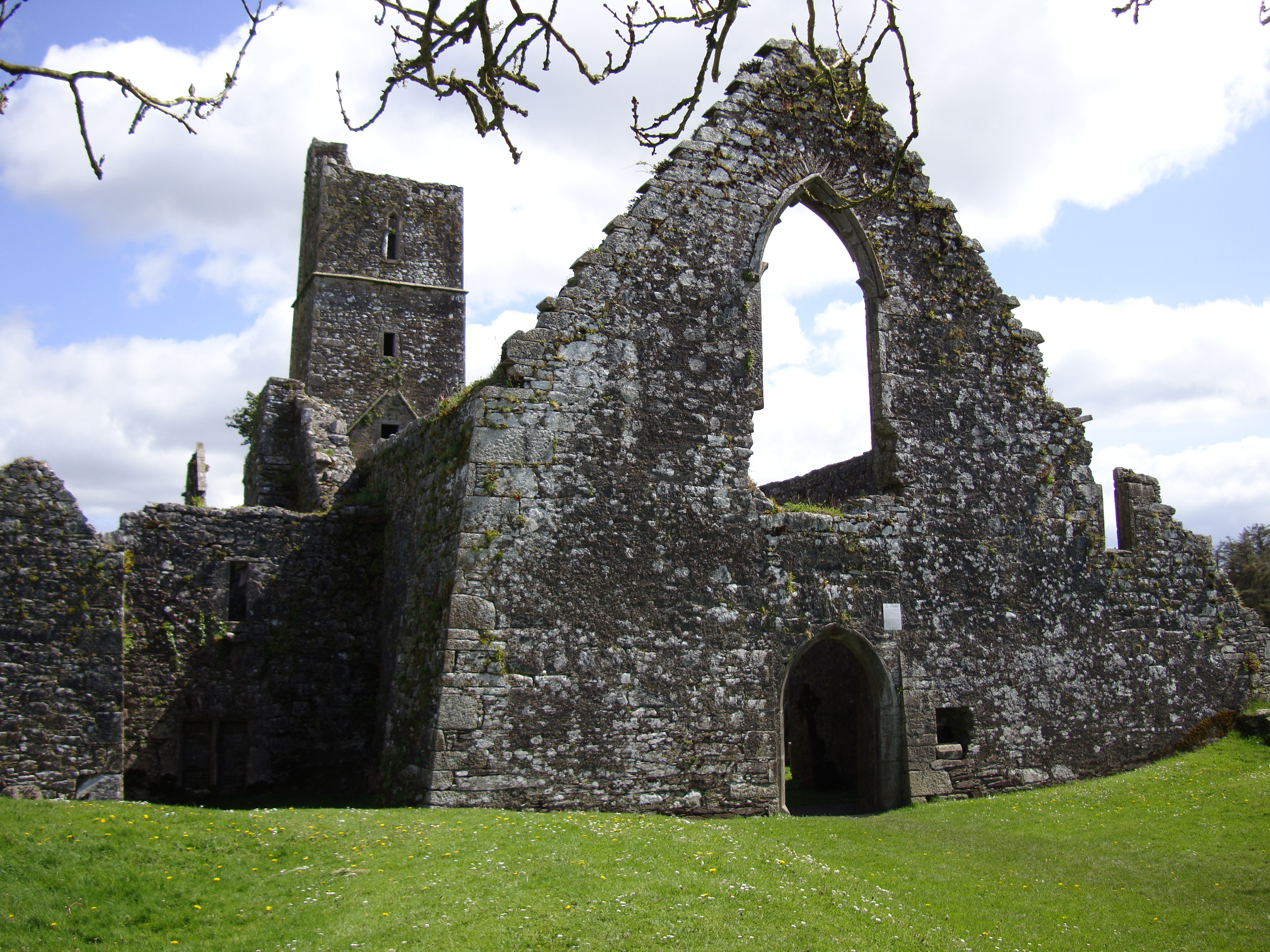
Kilcrea Friary in mid-Cork. Founded in 1465

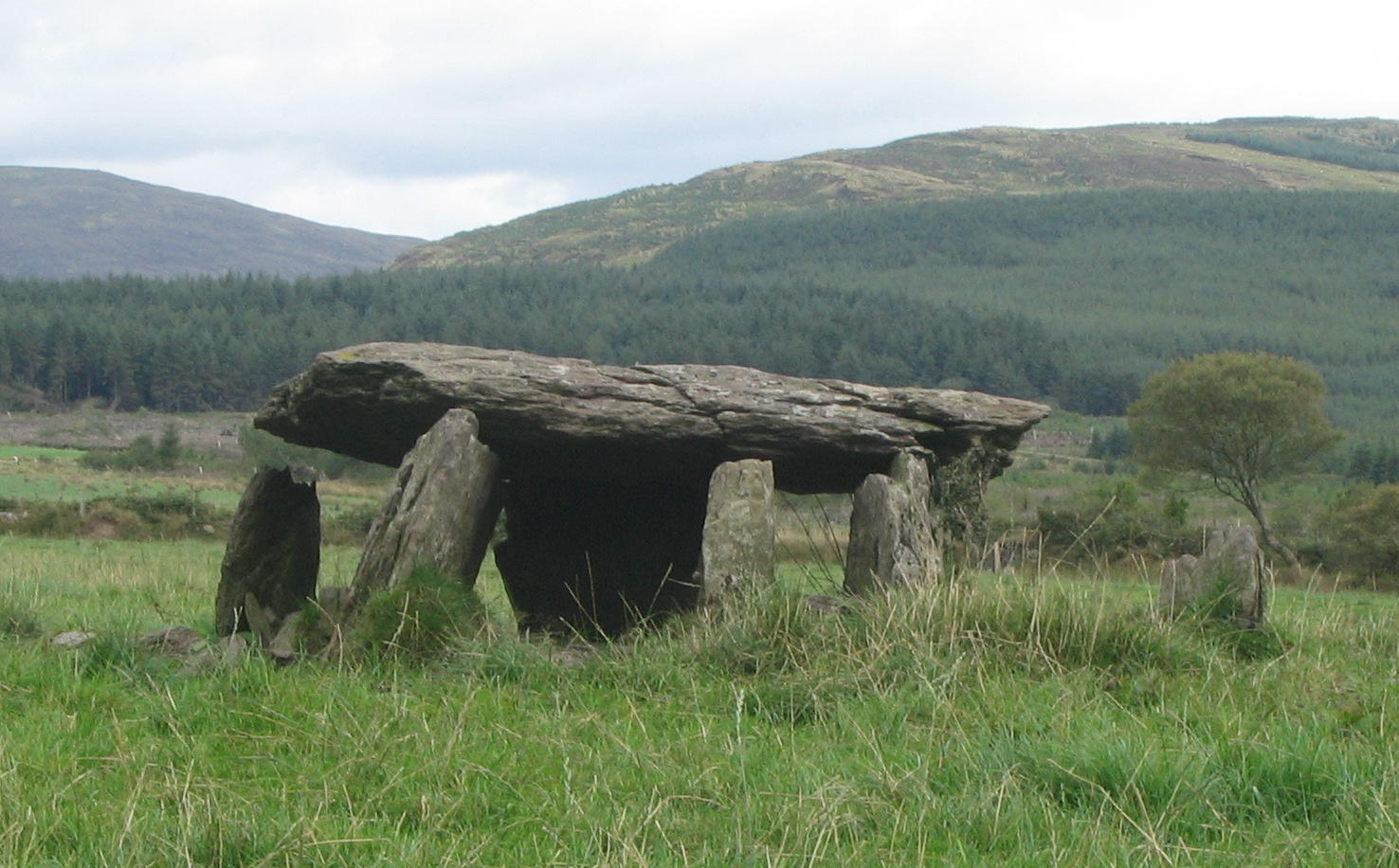
Wedge tomb, Glantane East

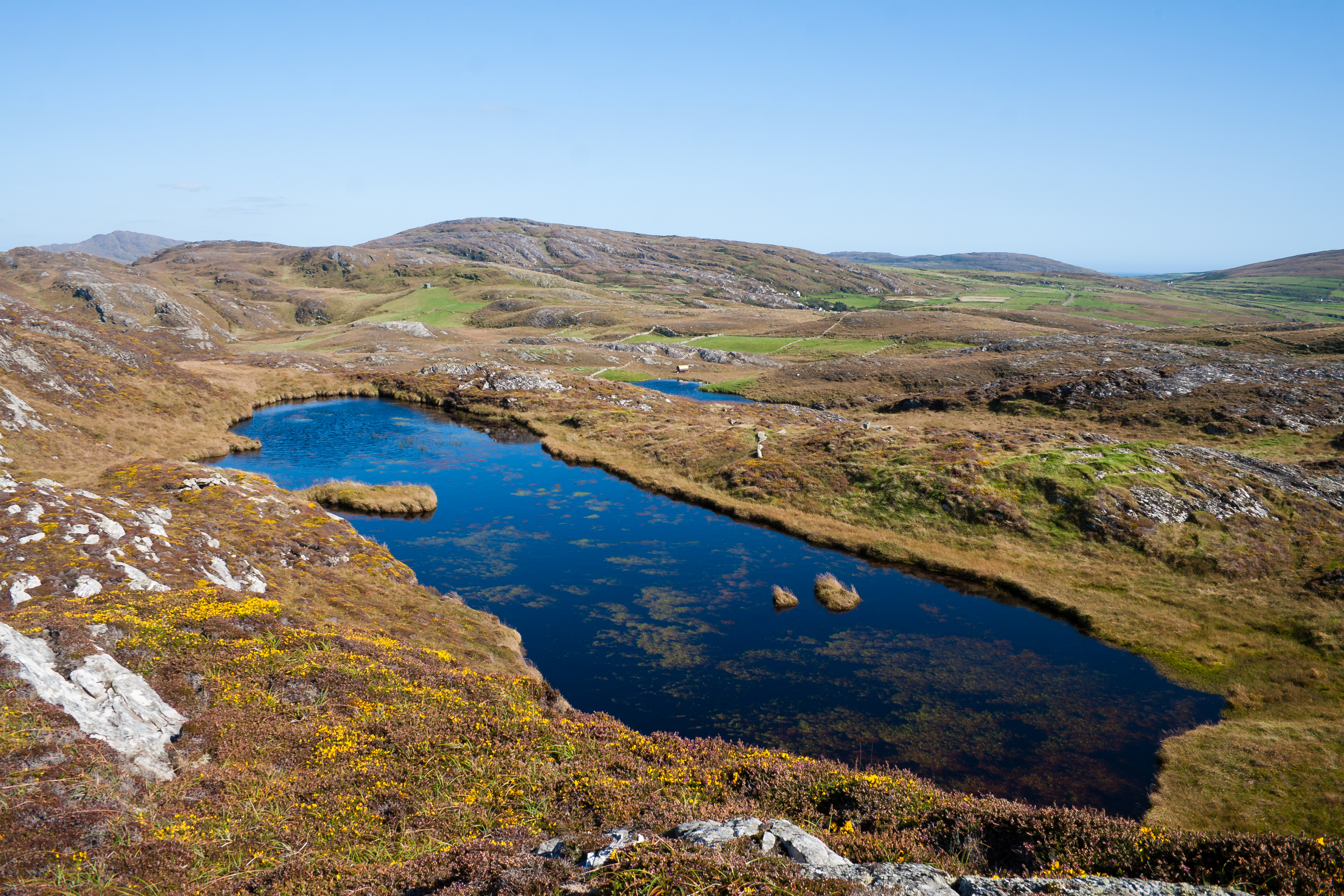
Upper lake at Three Castle Head, Mizen Head

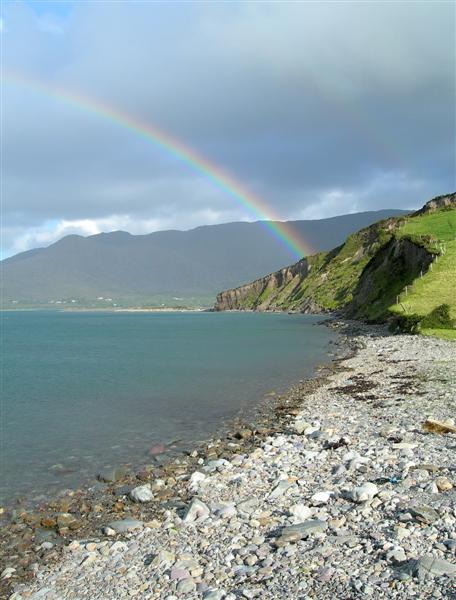
Pulleen Strand, on the Beara peninsula

== Economy ==
The South-West Region, comprising counties Cork and Kerry, contributed €103.2 billion (approximately US$111.6 billion) towards the Irish GDP in 2020.

The harbour area east of Cork city is home to many pharmaceutical and medical companies. Mahon Point Shopping Centre is Cork's largest, and Munster's second-largest, shopping centre; it contains over 75 stores including a retail park. The Golden Vale is among the most productive farmland for dairy in Ireland. The chief milk processor is Dairygold, a farmer-owned co-operative based in Mitchelstown, which processes 1.4 billion litres a year, converting the milk into cheeses and powder dairy nutrition for infant formula.

== Demographics ==
Leading population centres
Rank	City or town	Population (2022)
1	Cork	224,004
2	Carrigaline	18,239
3	Cobh	14,148
4	Midleton	13,906
5	Mallow	13,456
6	Youghal	8,564
7	Bandon	8,196
8	Fermoy	6,720
9	Passage West-Monkstown	6,051
10	Kinsale	5,991

The city of Cork forms the largest urban area in the county, with a total population of 224,004 as of 2022. Cork is the second-most populous city in the Republic of Ireland, and the third-most populous city on the island of Ireland. In 2022, the county had 13 towns with a population of over 4,000. The county has a population density of 77.8 inhabitants per square kilometre (202/sq mi). A large percentage of the population lives in urban areas.

In the 1841 census, before the outbreak of the Great Famine, County Cork had a recorded population of 854,118. By the 2022 census, Cork city and county had a combined population of 584,156 people.

In the 2022 census, ethnically the population included 78.5% White Irish people, 9.9% other White background, 1.4% Asian and 1.1% Black. In 2022, the largest religious denominations in Cork were: Catholicism (71%), Church of Ireland (2.3%), Orthodox (1.2%), and Islam (1.2%). Those stating that they had no religion accounted for 15.7% of the population in 2022.

== Transport ==
Cork's main transport is serviced from:

- Air: Cork International Airport
- Rail: Iarnród Éireann's InterCity, Commuter and Freight rail services
- Sea: Port of Cork at Cork Harbour

== People ==
Common surnames in the county include Barry, Buckley, Callaghan, Connell, Connor, Crowley, Lynch, McCarthy, Murphy, O'Leary, O'Sullivan, Sheehan, Walsh, and Fitzgerald (the latter with a Norman derivation).

== Sources ==
- Bourke, Edward; Hayden, Alan; Lynch, Ann; O'Sullivan, Michael (2011). Skellig Michael, Co. Kerry: The Monastery and South Peak: Archaeological Stratigraphic Report: Excavations 1986–2010. Dublin: Department of Culture, Heritage and the Gaeltacht. OCLC 795846647.
- Bracken, Damian; Riain-Raedel, Dagmar Ó (2006). Ireland and Europe in the Twelfth Century: Reform and Renewal. Dublin: Four Courts Press. ISBN 978-1-85182-848-7.
- Keohane, Frank (2020). Cork: City and County. Buildings of Ireland. New Haven, CT / London: Yale University Press. ISBN 978-0-300-22487-0.
- "Skellig Michael World Heritage Site Management Plan : 2008–2018" (PDF). Department of the Environment, Heritage and Local Government. 2008. OCLC 916003677. Archived (PDF) from the original on 30 August 2017.
