= List of townlands of County Limerick =

Townlands of County Limerick, Ireland

This is a sortable table of the approximately 2,068 townlands in County Limerick, Ireland.

Duplicate names occur where there is more than one townland with the same name in the county. Names marked in bold typeface are towns and villages, and the word Town appears for those entries in the Acres column.

== Townland list ==
Townland	Acres	Barony	Civil parish	Poor law union
Abbey	222	Coshlea	Kilflyn	Kilmallock
Abbeyfarm	55	Kilmallock	St. Peter's & St. Paul's	Kilmallock
**Abbeyfeale**	Town	Glenquin	Abbeyfeale	Newcastle
Abbeyfeale East	1,350	Glenquin	Abbeyfeale	Newcastle
Abbeyfeale West	718	Glenquin	Abbeyfeale	Newcastle
Abbeylands	105	Connello Lower	Rathkeale	Rathkeale
Abington	380	Owneybeg	Abington	Limerick
Acres	162	Glenquin	Killeedy	Kanturk
Adamstown	219	Smallcounty	Athneasy	Kilmallock
Adamswood	302	Connello Lower	Croagh	Rathkeale
**Adare**	Town	Coshma	Adare	Croom
Adare	856	Coshma	Adare	Croom
Aghalacka	358	Connello Lower	Askeaton	Rathkeale
Ahabeg	123	Clanwilliam	Carrigparson	Limerick
Ahabeg (Rose)	80	Clanwilliam	Carrigparson	Limerick
Ahacore	164	Owneybeg	Abington	Limerick
Ahadagh	438	Connello Upper	Kilmeedy	Newcastle
Ahaveheen	399	Connello Upper	Cloncrew	Newcastle
Ahawilk	1,010	Glenquin	Mahoonagh	Newcastle
Ahnagurra	398	Coshlea	Ballingarry	Kilmallock
Altavilla	274	Connello Lower	Lismakeery	Rathkeale
Altavilla	55	Connello Lower	Nantinan	Rathkeale
Amogan Beg	227	Connello Lower	Croagh	Rathkeale
Amogan More	511	Connello Lower	Croagh	Rathkeale
Anglesborough	1,253	Coshlea	Kilbeheny	Mitchelstown
Anglesborough	709	Coshlea	Galbally	Mitchelstown
Anglode	62	Clanwilliam	Caherconlish	Limerick
Anhid East	119	Coshma	Anhid	Croom
AnhidWest	378	Coshma	Anhid	Croom
Annagh	859	Owneybeg	Abington	Limerick
Annagh	519	Coshlea	Galbally	Mitchelstown
Appletown	713	Glenquin	Mahoonagh	Newcastle
**Ardagh**	Town	Shanid	Ardagh	Newcastle
Ardagh	75	Shanid	Ardagh	Newcastle
Ardaneer	250	Shanid	Shanagolden	Rathkeale
Ardanreagh	85	Coshma	Tullabracky	Kilmallock
Ardbohil	266	Connello Lower	Rathkeale	Rathkeale
Arddrine	330	Glenquin	Grange	Newcastle
Ardgoul North	192	Connello Lower	Nantinan	Rathkeale
Ardgoul South	176	Connello Lower	Nantinan	Rathkeale
Ardgoulbeg	180	Connello Lower	Nantinan	Rathkeale
Ardkilmartin	409	Kilmallock	St. Peter's & St. Paul's	Kilmallock
Ardlahan	275	Kenry	Kildimo	Rathkeale
Ardlaman	238	Shanid	Kilbradran	Rathkeale
Ardmore	41	Coshlea	Ballyscaddan	Kilmallock
Ardnacrohy	243	Glenquin	Monagay	Newcastle
Ardnamoher	597	Coshlea	Galbally	Mitchelstown
Ardnanean	114	Connello Lower	Rathkeale	Rathkeale
Ardnapreaghaun	91	Connello Lower	Croagh	Rathkeale
Ardnaveagh	182	Connello Lower	Doondonnell	Rathkeale
Ardpatrick	154	Coshlea	Ardpatrick	Kilmallock
Ardrahin	305	Coshlea	Galbally	Mitchelstown
Ardroe	221	Clanwilliam	Grean	Limerick
Ardshanbally	179	Coshma	Adare	Croom
Ardtomin	94	Connello Lower	Nantinan	Rathkeale
Ardvarna	172	Clanwilliam	Killeenagarriff	Limerick
Ardvone	56	Shanid	Ardagh	Newcastle
Ardykeohane	139	Coshma	Bruff	Kilmallock
Ardyoul	67	Kilmallock	St. Peter's & St. Paul's	Kilmallock
Arranagh	235	Glenquin	Monagay	Newcastle
Arrybreaga	167	Coonagh	Oola	Tipperary
Arywee	144	Clanwilliam	Fedamore	Limerick
Ash Hill	257	Kilmallock	St. Peter's & St. Paul's	Kilmallock
Ashfort	315	Pubblebrien	Crecora	Limerick
Ashgrove	455	Glenquin	Newcastle	Newcastle
Ashroe	802	Owneybeg	Abington	Limerick
**Askeaton**	Town	Connello Lower	Askeaton	Rathkeale
Askeaton	640	Connello Lower	Askeaton	Rathkeale
**Athea**	Town	Shanid	Rathronan	Newcastle
Athea Lower	552	Shanid	Rathronan	Newcastle
Athea Upper	1,986	Shanid	Rathronan	Newcastle
Athlacca North	492	Coshma	Athlacca	Kilmallock
Athlacca South	314	Coshma	Athlacca	Kilmallock
Attyflin	440	Pubblebrien	Killonahan	Limerick
Aughalin	565	Glenquin	Clonelty	Newcastle
Aughinish East	563	Shanid	Robertstown	Rathkeale
Aughinish West	502	Shanid	Robertstown	Rathkeale
Badgerfort	110	Smallcounty	Kilpeacon	Croom
Baggotstown	387	Smallcounty	Knockainy	Kilmallock
Baggotstown East	457	Smallcounty	Knockainy	Kilmallock
Baggotstown West	460	Smallcounty	Knockainy	Kilmallock
Ballagh	329	Glenquin	Killeedy	Newcastle
Ballaghbehy	1,438	Glenquin	Abbeyfeale	Newcastle
Ballaghbehy North	1,152	Glenquin	Abbeyfeale	Newcastle
Ballaghbehy South	521	Glenquin	Abbeyfeale	Newcastle
Ballinacarroona	63	Coshlea	Kilquane	Kilmallock
Ballinacurra (Bowman)	119	Pubblebrien	St. Michael's	Limerick
Ballinacurra (Hart)	196	Pubblebrien	St. Michael's	Limerick
Ballinacurra (Weston)	290	Pubblebrien	St. Michael's	Limerick
Ballinanima (Brew)	203	Coshlea	Kilfinnane	Kilmallock
Ballinanima (D'Arcy)	378	Coshlea	Kilfinnane	Kilmallock
Ballinanima (Massy)	178	Coshlea	Kilfinnane	Kilmallock
Ballinard	505	Smallcounty	Ballinard	Kilmallock
Ballincarroona	610	Smallcounty	Kilfrush	Kilmallock
Ballincarroona	96	Coshlea	Effin	Kilmallock
Ballincassa	67	Coonagh	Grean	Tipperary
Ballincolloo	387	Smallcounty	Uregare	Kilmallock
Ballincolly	312	Coshma	Hackmys	Kilmallock
Ballincrana	172	Coshlea	Particles	Kilmallock
Ballinculloo	207	Coshma	Athlacca	Kilmallock
Ballincurra	412	Coshma	Athlacca	Kilmallock
Ballincurra	310	Smallcounty	Ballynamona	Kilmallock
Ballincurra	285	Connello Lower	Croagh	Rathkeale
Ballincurra	163	Coshlea	Kilbreedy Major	Kilmallock
Balline	323	Coshlea	Emlygrennan	Kilmallock
Balline	212	Smallcounty	Athneasy	Kilmallock
Ballinfreera	86	Coshma	Croom	Croom
Ballingaddy North	361	Coshlea	Ballingaddy	Kilmallock
Ballingaddy South	129	Coshlea	Ballingaddy	Kilmallock
Ballingarrane	724	Connello Lower	Nantinan	Rathkeale
**Ballingarry**	Town	Connello Upper	Ballingarry	Croom
Ballingarry	630	Coshlea	Ballingarry	Kilmallock
Ballingayrour	468	Coshma	Dromin	Kilmallock
Ballingoola	394	Smallcounty	Cahercorney	Kilmallock
Ballingowan	216	Glenquin	Grange	Newcastle
Ballinina	369	Glenquin	Newcastle	Newcastle
Balliniska	673	Glenquin	Mahoonagh	Newcastle
Ballinknockane	169	Shanid	Kilmoylan	Rathkeale
Ballinlee	6	Coshma	Uregare	Kilmallock
Ballinlee North	233	Coshma	Dromin	Kilmallock
Ballinlee South	145	Coshma	Dromin	Kilmallock
Ballinlongig	664	Connello Upper	Dromcolliher	Newcastle
Ballinlough	856	Smallcounty	Ballinlough	Kilmallock
Ballinloughane	195	Shanid	Dunmoylan	Rathkeale
Ballinloughare	1,998	Shanid	Ardagh	Newcastle
Ballinlyna Lower	343	Coshlea	Kilfinnane	Kilmallock
Ballinlyny	266	Connello Lower	Kilscannell	Rathkeale
Ballinoran	178	Connello Upper	Bruree	Kilmallock
Ballinrea	212	Coshma	Dromin	Kilmallock
Ballinree	43	Shanid	Shanagolden	Glin
Ballinroche East	114	Pubblebrien	Crecora	Croom
Ballinroche North	120	Pubblebrien	Crecora	Croom
Ballinruane	1,560	Connello Upper	Kilmeedy	Croom
Ballinscaula	677	Coshlea	Athneasy	Kilmallock
Ballinscoola	265	Smallcounty	Kilcullane	Kilmallock
Ballinscoola	63	Smallcounty	Ballynamona	Kilmallock
Ballinstona North	418	Coshma	Uregare	Kilmallock
Ballinstona South	141	Smallcounty	Uregare	Kilmallock
Ballintaw	449	Coshma	Croom	Croom
Ballintober	1,633	Coshlea	Darragh	Kilmallock
Ballintober East	349	Glenquin	Killeedy	Newcastle
Ballintober South	132	Glenquin	Killeedy	Newcastle
Ballintober West	121	Glenquin	Killeedy	Newcastle
Ballintredida	141	Connello Lower	Nantinan	Rathkeale
Ballintubbrid	375	Glenquin	Monagay	Newcastle
Ballinvallig	112	Glenquin	Monagay	Newcastle
Ballinvana	369	Coshlea	Athneasy	Kilmallock
Ballinvana	126	Coshlea	Emlygrennan	Kilmallock
Ballinveala	352	Pubblebrien	Crecora	Croom
Ballinvira	413	Connello Lower	Croagh	Rathkeale
Ballinvira	26	Connello Lower	Cappagh	Rathkeale
Ballinvirick	278	Connello Lower	Nantinan	Rathkeale
Ballinvoher	367	Kenry	Iveruss	Rathkeale
Ballinvreena	752	Coshlea	Ballingarry	Kilmallock
Ballinvreena	154	Coshlea	Emlygrennan	Kilmallock
Ballinvulla	59	Connello Lower	Clonagh	Rathkeale
Ballinvulla	45	Connello Lower	Kilbradran	Rathkeale
Ballinvullin	382	Glenquin	Mahoonagh	Newcastle
Ballinwillin	179	Connello Upper	Bruree	Kilmallock
Ballinyna Upper	417	Coshlea	Kilfinnane	Kilmallock
Ballyadam	197	Clanwilliam	Caherconlish	Limerick
Ballyadam	75	Connello Lower	Nantinan	Rathkeale
Ballyaglish	259	Kenry	Iveruss	Rathkeale
**Ballyagran**	Town	Connello Upper	Corcomohide	Croom
Ballyagran	321	Connello Upper	Corcomohide	Croom
Ballyallinan North	619	Connello Lower	Rathkeale	Rathkeale
Ballyallinan South	666	Connello Lower	Rathkeale	Rathkeale
Ballyan	396	Shanid	Kilbradran	Rathkeale
Ballyane	184	Shanid	Kilmoylan	Glin
Ballyania	356	Coshma	Uregare	Kilmallock
Ballyanrahan East	316	Pubblebrien	Kilkeedy	Limerick
Ballyanrahan West	105	Pubblebrien	Kilkeedy	Limerick
Ballyart	320	Clanwilliam	Caherconlish	Limerick
Ballyashea	210	Kenry	Kildimo	Rathkeale
Ballybane	405	Connello Upper	Corcomohide	Croom
Ballybane	87	Coshma	Tullabracky	Kilmallock
Ballybaun	115	Connello Lower	Nantinan	Rathkeale
Ballybeg	162	Smallcounty	Uregare	Kilmallock
Ballybeg	158	Coonagh	Oola	Tipperary
Ballybeg	114	Clanwilliam	Dromkeen	Limerick
Ballybeggane	283	Connello Upper	Cloncagh	Newcastle
Ballyblake	179	Clanwilliam	Caherelly	Limerick
Ballybrennan	58	Clanwilliam	Cahernarry	Limerick
Ballybricken East	185	Clanwilliam	Inch St. Lawrence	Limerick
Ballybricken East	31	Clanwilliam	Caherelly	Limerick
Ballybricken North	167	Clanwilliam	Caherelly	Limerick
Ballybricken South	345	Clanwilliam	Caherelly	Limerick
Ballybricken West	321	Clanwilliam	Inch St. Lawrence	Limerick
Ballybrien	519	Coshlea	Ballylanders	Mitchelstown
Ballybronoge North	92	Pubblebrien	Killonahan	Limerick
Ballybronoge South	167	Pubblebrien	Killonahan	Limerick
Ballybrood	357	Clanwilliam	Ballybrood	Limerick
Ballybrown	325	Pubblebrien	Kilkeedy	Limerick
Ballybrown	138	Connello Lower	Rathkeale	Rathkeale
Ballybrown	136	Glenquin	Clonelty	Rathkeale
Ballycahane	254	Kenry	Kilcornan	Rathkeale
Ballycahane Lower	255	Pubblebrien	Ballycahane	Croom
Ballycahane Middle	247	Pubblebrien	Ballycahane	Croom
Ballycahane Upper	418	Pubblebrien	Ballycahane	Croom
Ballycahill	596	Smallcounty	Hospital	Kilmallock
Ballycampion	148	Coshma	Bruff	Kilmallock
Ballycanauna	273	Kenry	Iveruss	Rathkeale
Ballycannon	252	Connello Lower	Croagh	Rathkeale
Ballycarney	139	Pubblebrien	Kilkeedy	Limerick
Ballycarrane	274	Pubblebrien	Croom	Limerick
Ballycasey	631	Kenry	Kildimo	Croom
Ballyclogh	490	Connello Lower	Lismakeery	Rathkeale
Ballyclogh	361	Pubblebrien	Knocknagaul	Limerick
Ballyclogh	203	Clanwilliam	Kilmurry	Limerick
Ballyclogh Lower	37	Connello Upper	Bruree	Kilmallock
Ballyclogh Upper	174	Connello Upper	Bruree	Kilmallock
Ballycluvane	131	Glenquin	Monagay	Newcastle
Ballyconway	162	Glenquin	Monagay	Newcastle
Ballycormick	446	Shanid	Shanagolden	Glin
Ballycoshown	208	Coonagh	Doon	Tipperary
Ballyculhane	382	Kenry	Kildimo	Rathkeale
Ballycullane	736	Smallcounty	Glenogra	Croom
Ballycullane	346	Coshlea	Kilbreedy Major	Kilmallock
Ballycullane	286	Kilmallock	St. Peter's & St. Paul's	Kilmallock
Ballycullane Lower	163	Shanid	Kilfergus	Glin
Ballycullane Upper	324	Shanid	Kilfergus	Glin
Ballyculleen	429	Coshma	Croom	Croom
Ballycullen	263	Connello Lower	Lismakeery	Rathkeale
Ballycummin	697	Pubblebrien	Mungret	Limerick
Ballydaheen	195	Coshma	Bruff	Kilmallock
Ballydaly	69	Smallcounty	Knockainy	Kilmallock
Ballydonnell	350	Glenquin	Mahoonagh	Newcastle
Ballydonohoe	403	Shanid	Kilfergus	Glin
Ballydonohoe	207	Coshlea	Kilflyn	Kilmallock
Ballydoole	464	Kenry	Ardcanny	Rathkeale
Ballydoole	46	Kenry	Chapelrussell	Rathkeale
Ballydoorlis	141	Shanid	Kilcolman	Glin
Ballydoorty	415	Glenquin	Mahoonagh	Newcastle
Ballyduane	127	Pubblebrien	Mungret	Limerick
Ballyduff	506	Coshlea	Ballylanders	Mitchelstown
Ballyduhig	237	Glenquin	Killeedy	Newcastle
Ballyea	541	Connello Lower	Rathkeale	Rathkeale
Ballyea	476	Smallcounty	Fedamore	Croom
Ballyea	140	Connello Lower	Croagh	Rathkeale
Ballyeawood	246	Connello Lower	Rathkeale	Rathkeale
Ballyegny	168	Shanid	Rathronan	Glin
Ballyegny Beg	116	Connello Lower	Clonagh	Glin
Ballyegny More	240	Connello Lower	Clonagh	Glin
Ballyelan	532	Connello Upper	Ballingarry	Croom
Ballyellinan	229	Connello Lower	Lismakeery	Rathkeale
Ballyengland Lower	450	Connello Lower	Askeaton	Rathkeale
Ballyengland Upper	461	Connello Lower	Askeaton	Rathkeale
Ballyfauskeen	679	Coshlea	Ballylanders	Mitchelstown
Ballyfauskeen	156	Coshlea	Galbally	Mitchelstown
Ballyfeerode	493	Coshlea	Darragh	Kilmallock
Ballyfirreen North	44	Coonagh	Oola	Tipperary
Ballyfirreen South	13	Coonagh	Oola	Tipperary
Ballyfoleen North	232	Connello Upper	Kilfinny	Croom
Ballyfoleen North	201	Connello Upper	Kilfinny	Croom
Ballyfookeen	604	Connello Upper	Bruree	Kilmallock
Ballyfookoon	157	Coshma	Killonahan	Croom
Ballyfraley	257	Glenquin	Grange	Newcastle
Ballyfroota	486	Coshlea	Ballingarry	Kilmallock
Ballygeagoge	349	Coshlea	Particles	Kilmallock
Ballygeale	206	Coshma	Adare	Croom
Ballygeale	201	Coshma	Killonahan	Croom
Ballygeana	643	Coshlea	Galbally	Mitchelstown
Ballygeel	365	Glenquin	Monagay	Newcastle
Ballygillane	327	Coshlea	Ballingaddy	Kilmallock
Ballygiltenan Lower	490	Shanid	Kilfergus	Glin
Ballygiltenan North	135	Shanid	Kilfergus	Glin
Ballygiltenan Upper	1,110	Shanid	Kilfergus	Glin
Ballygoghlan	893	Shanid	Kilfergus	Glin
Ballygrennan	950	Connello Upper	Ballingarry	Croom
Ballygrennan	698	Coshma	Uregare	Kilmallock
Ballygrennan	437	Coshlea	Kilbreedy Major	Kilmallock
Ballygrennan	309	Pubblebrien	St. Munchin's	Limerick
Ballygrennan	267	Coshma	Croom	Croom
Ballygriffin	103	Coshma	Killeenoghty	Croom
Ballygubba North	247	Coshma	Tankardstown	Kilmallock
Ballygubba South	389	Coshma	Tankardstown	Kilmallock
Ballyguileataggle	483	Connello Upper	Ballingarry	Croom
Ballyguilebeg	95	Connello Upper	Ballingarry	Croom
Ballygulleen	422	Glenquin	Mahoonagh	Newcastle
Ballyguy	199	Clanwilliam	Abington	Limerick
Ballyguy	29	Clanwilliam	Clonkeen	Limerick
Ballyhaght	401	Coshlea	Kilquane	Kilmallock
Ballyhahil	497	Connello Upper	Cloncagh	Newcastle
**Ballyhahill**	Town	Shanid	Kilmoylan	Glin
Ballyhahill	605	Shanid	Kilmoylan	Glin
Ballyhaukish	110	Smallcounty	Knockainy	Kilmallock
Ballyhibbin	108	Connello Lower	Nantinan	Rathkeale
Ballyhinnaught	455	Connello Upper	Bruree	Kilmallock
Ballyhobin	265	Clanwilliam	Ballybrood	Limerick
Ballyhomin	345	Connello Lower	Askeaton	Rathkeale
Ballyhomock	223	Connello Lower	Nantinan	Rathkeale
Ballyhoodane	305	Clanwilliam	Inch St. Lawrence	Limerick
Ballyhoolahan	106	Shanid	Loghill	Glin
Ballyhurst	51	Coonagh	Ballynaclogh	Tipperary
Ballyine	874	Shanid	Ardagh	Newcastle
Ballykealy	83	Shanid	Rathronan	Glin
Ballykeefe	546	Pubblebrien	Mungret	Limerick
Ballykennedy North	130	Connello Upper	Cloncagh	Newcastle
Ballykennedy South	324	Connello Upper	Cloncagh	Newcastle
Ballykenny	463	Glenquin	Killeedy	Newcastle
Ballykenry	197	Connello Lower	Clonagh	Rathkeale
Ballykevan East	147	Connello Upper	Ballingarry	Newcastle
Ballykevan West	194	Connello Upper	Ballingarry	Newcastle
Ballyknockane	145	Connello Upper	Ballingarry	Croom
Ballylahiff	294	Coonagh	Oola	Tipperary
Ballylahiff	147	Glenquin	Newcastle	Newcastle
**Ballylanders**	Town	Coshlea	Ballylanders	Mitchelstown
Ballylanders	755	Coshlea	Ballylanders	Mitchelstown
Ballylanigan	99	Glenquin	Killeedy	Newcastle
Ballylin	483	Shanid	Rathronan	Newcastle
Ballylin	328	Connello Lower	Croagh	Rathkeale
Ballylin	197	Shanid	Kilmoylan	Rathkeale
Ballylin	108	Shanid	Kilbradran	Rathkeale
Ballylinane	198	Glenquin	Monagay	Newcastle
Ballylongford	282	Kenry	Adare	Croom
Ballylooby	446	Coshlea	Galbally	Mitchelstown
Ballyloughnaan	263	Pubblebrien	Croom	Croom
Ballyloundash	316	Smallcounty	Ballinard	Kilmallock
Ballyluddy	141	Coonagh	Ballynaclogh	Tipperary
Ballylusky	142	Coshma	Killonahan	Croom
Ballylusky	26	Coshma	Croom	Croom
Ballymacashel	90	Pubblebrien	Mungret	Limerick
Ballymacave	264	Connello Lower	Croagh	Rathkeale
Ballymacdonagh	143	Kenry	Kilcornan	Rathkeale
Ballymackeamore	535	Connello Upper	Kilfinny	Croom
Ballymackesy	182	Glenquin	Monagay	Newcastle
Ballymacreese	455	Clanwilliam	Ludden	Limerick
Ballymacrory	237	Coshma	Croom	Croom
Ballymacrory	145	Coshma	Anhid	Croom
Ballymacshaneboy	706	Coshlea	Kilquane	Kilmallock
Ballymacshaneboy	51	Coshlea	Effin	Kilmallock
Ballymacsradeen East	268	Coshma	Monasteranenagh	Croom
Ballymacsradeen West	345	Pubblebrien	Monasteranenagh	Croom
Ballymakeery	92	Shanid	Rathronan	Glin
Ballymartin	390	Kenry	Kilcornan	Rathkeale
Ballymartin	250	Pubblebrien	Monasteranenagh	Croom
Ballymongaun	86	Connello Upper	Cloncrew	Newcastle
Ballymongaun	68	Connello Upper	Dromcolliher	Newcastle
Ballymorrisheen	144	Connello Lower	Nantinan	Rathkeale
Ballymorrisheen	126	Glenquin	Grange	Newcastle
Ballymurphy	118	Pubblebrien	Crecora	Croom
Ballymurragh East	824	Glenquin	Monagay	Newcastle
Ballymurragh West	385	Glenquin	Monagay	Newcastle
Ballynabanoge	412	Coshma	Croom	Croom
Ballynabearna	352	Shanid	Ardagh	Newcastle
Ballynacaheragh	350	Connello Lower	Askeaton	Rathkeale
Ballynacally	89	Shanid	Ardagh	Newcastle
Ballynacarriga	845	Kenry	Ardcanny	Rathkeale
Ballynaclogh	290	Coonagh	Ballynaclogh	Tipperary
Ballynacourty	1,035	Coshlea	Darragh	Kilmallock
Ballynacourty	410	Kenry	Iveruss	Rathkeale
Ballynacourty	109	Clanwilliam	Stradbally	Limerick
Ballynacragga	229	Shanid	Shanagolden	Glin
Ballynacragga North	51	Shanid	Robertstown	Glin
Ballynacragga South	31	Shanid	Robertstown	Glin
Ballynagallagh	475	Smallcounty	Knockainy	Kilmallock
Ballynagally	424	Coonagh	Aglishcormick	Tipperary
Ballynagally	81	Coonagh	Grean	Tipperary
Ballynagarde	368	Clanwilliam	Cahernarry	Limerick
Ballynagarde	156	Clanwilliam	Fedamore	Limerick
Ballynagarde	134	Clanwilliam	Caheravally	Limerick
Ballynagaul	573	Shanid	Kilfergus	Glin
Ballynagool	350	Connello Lower	Croagh	Rathkeale
Ballynagoul	963	Coshma	Hackmys	Kilmallock
Ballynagowan	80	Clanwilliam	Killeenagarriff	Limerick
Ballynagowan	14	Clanwilliam	Stradbally	Limerick
Ballynagranagh	414	Smallcounty	Ballinlough	Kilmallock
Ballynagreanagh	362	Coonagh	Kilteely	Tipperary
Ballynaguila	459	Connello Lower	Croagh	Rathkeale
Ballynahaha	462	Connello Upper	Ballingarry	Croom
Ballynahallee	168	Kenry	Kildimo	Rathkeale
Ballynahinch	962	Coshlea	Knocklong	Kilmallock
Ballynahown	343	Coshlea	Ballingaddy	Kilmallock
Ballynahown	132	Coshma	Croom	Croom
Ballynahown	131	Glenquin	Monagay	Newcastle
Ballynakill	467	Connello Upper	Kilfinny	Croom
Ballynakill Beg	147	Glenquin	Mahoonagh	Newcastle
Ballynakill More	405	Glenquin	Mahoonagh	Newcastle
Ballynalacken	312	Coshlea	Ballingarry	Kilmallock
Ballynalahagh	31	Smallcounty	Knockainy	Kilmallock
Ballynamoloogh	220	Coshlea	Ballingaddy	Kilmallock
Ballynamona	844	Smallcounty	Ballynamona	Kilmallock
Ballynamona	565	Coshlea	Galbally	Mitchelstown
Ballynamona	438	Kenry	Kilcornan	Rathkeale
Ballynamona	267	Smallcounty	Uregare	Kilmallock
Ballynamucky	389	Connello Lower	Rathkeale	Croom
Ballynamuddagh	619	Coshlea	Galbally	Mitchelstown
Ballynamuddagh	476	Coshma	Dromin	Kilmallock
Ballynamuddagh	221	Shanid	Kilfergus	Glin
Ballynamuddagh	103	Connello Lower	Clonagh	Rathkeale
Ballynanty	404	Coshma	Tullabracky	Kilmallock
Ballynanty Beg	68	Pubblebrien	Killeely	Limerick
Ballynanty More	121	Pubblebrien	Killeely	Limerick
Ballynarooga Beg	72	Connello Upper	Cloncagh	Newcastle
Ballynarooga Beg (East)	131	Connello Upper	Ballingarry	Croom
Ballynarooga Beg (West)	209	Connello Upper	Ballingarry	Croom
Ballynarooga More (North)	117	Connello Upper	Cloncagh	Newcastle
Ballynarooga More (South)	427	Connello Upper	Cloncagh	Newcastle
Ballynash	80	Connello Lower	Askeaton	Rathkeale
Ballynash (Bishop)	417	Shanid	Shanagolden	Glin
Ballynash (Clare)	381	Shanid	Shanagolden	Glin
Ballynashig	149	Connello Upper	Ballingarry	Croom
Ballynatona	309	Coshlea	Kilbeheny	Mitchelstown
Ballynatona	251	Coshlea	Galbally	Mitchelstown
Ballyneale	656	Connello Upper	Ballingarry	Croom
**Ballyneety**	Town	Clanwilliam	Cahernarry	Limerick
Ballyneety	295	Shanid	Kilbradran	Rathkeale
Ballyneety	105	Coonagh	Oola	Tipperary
Ballyneety	94	Clanwilliam	Cahernarry	Limerick
Ballyneety North	164	Coonagh	Templebredon	Tipperary
Ballyneety South	228	Coonagh	Templebredon	Tipperary
Ballynisky	213	Connello Lower	Clonagh	Rathkeale
Ballynoe	666	Glenquin	Clonelty	Newcastle
Ballynoe	661	Connello Upper	Ballingarry	Croom
Ballynoe	158	Pubblebrien	Mungret	Limerick
Ballynoe	126	Glenquin	Mahoonagh	Newcastle
Ballynoe	118	Connello Upper	Bruree	Kilmallock
Ballynolan	119	Kenry	Kildimo	Rathkeale
Ballynort	657	Connello Lower	Askeaton	Rathkeale
Ballyogartha	66	Clanwilliam	Cahernarry	Limerick
**Ballyorgan**	Town	Coshlea	Kilflyn	Kilmallock
Ballyorgan	356	Coshlea	Kilflyn	Kilmallock
Ballyouragan	236	Coshma	Dysert	Croom
Ballyowen	175	Glenquin	Killeedy	Newcastle
Ballyphilip	644	Coshma	Croom	Croom
Ballyphilip	299	Clanwilliam	Aglishcormick	Limerick
Ballypierce	333	Glenquin	Newcastle	Newcastle
Ballyquirk	260	Glenquin	Monagay	Newcastle
Ballyreesode	140	Coshma	Bruff	Kilmallock
Ballyregan	457	Pubblebrien	Ballycahane	Croom
Ballyregan	104	Glenquin	Mahoonagh	Newcastle
Ballyriggin	336	Coshlea	Kilfinnane	Kilmallock
Ballyrobin	244	Connello Lower	Kilscannell	Rathkeale
Ballyroe	132	Shanid	Loghill	Glin
Ballyroe East	169	Connello Upper	Ballingarry	Croom
Ballyroe Lower	343	Coshlea	Kilfinnane	Kilmallock
Ballyroe Upper	351	Coshlea	Kilfinnane	Kilmallock
Ballyroe West	99	Connello Upper	Ballingarry	Croom
Ballyrune	187	Kenry	Kildimo	Rathkeale
Ballysalla	294	Connello Upper	Corcomohide	Croom
Ballysallagh	274	Clanwilliam	Caherelly	Limerick
Ballyshane	489	Coshlea	Darragh	Kilmallock
Ballyshane	137	Glenquin	Killeedy	Newcastle
Ballyshane	71	Pubblebrien	Kilpeacon	Croom
Ballyshanedehey	341	Coshlea	Kilquane	Kilmallock
Ballysheedy East	180	Clanwilliam	St. Nicholas	Limerick
Ballysheedy West	120	Clanwilliam	St. Nicholas	Limerick
Ballyshoneen	23	Coonagh	Oola	Tipperary
Ballyshonickbane	275	Kenry	Kilcornan	Rathkeale
Ballyshonikin	453	Coshlea	Effin	Kilmallock
Ballysimon	166	Clanwilliam	Kilmurry	Limerick
Ballysimon (Dickson)	24	Clanwilliam	Derrygalvin	Limerick
Ballysimon (Staunton)	123	Clanwilliam	Derrygalvin	Limerick
Ballysimon Commons	38	Clanwilliam	Derrygalvin	Limerick
Ballysteen	307	Kenry	Iveruss	Rathkeale
Ballysteen	220	Shanid	Kilbradran	Glin
Ballyteige Lower	339	Connello Upper	Bruree	Kilmallock
Ballyteige Upper	404	Connello Upper	Bruree	Kilmallock
Ballytrasna	342	Coonagh	Grean	Tipperary
Ballyvadddock	70	Connello Lower	Askeaton	Rathkeale
Ballyvaddock	117	Kenry	Iveruss	Rathkeale
Ballyvalode	249	Coonagh	Oola	Tipperary
Ballyvalode	152	Coonagh	Doon	Tipperary
Ballyvareen	314	Kenry	Kildimo	Rathkeale
Ballyvarra	478	Clanwilliam	Killeenagarriff	Limerick
Ballyvarra Wood	206	Clanwilliam	Killeenagarriff	Limerick
Ballyveelish	160	Pubblebrien	Crecora	Croom
Ballyveloge	354	Pubblebrien	Kilkeedy	Limerick
Ballyvockoge	357	Connello Lower	Nantinan	Rathkeale
Ballyvoghan	459	Shanid	Rathronan	Newcastle
Ballyvogue	224	Kenry	Kilcornan	Rathkeale
Ballyvollane	318	Clanwilliam	Stradbally	Limerick
Ballyvologe	282	Connello Upper	Ballingarry	Croom
Ballyvoneen	170	Coonagh	Grean	Tipperary
Ballyvoodane	275	Coshlea	Ballingaddy	Kilmallock
Ballyvoodane	48	Coshlea	Effin	Kilmallock
Ballyvorheen	832	Owneybeg	Abington	Limerick
Ballyvorneen	337	Clanwilliam	Caherconlish	Limerick
Ballyvouden	225	Coonagh	Kilteely	Kilmallock
Ballyvulhane	315	Coshma	Uregare	Kilmallock
Ballywilliam Demesne	212	Connello Lower	Rathkeale	Rathkeale
Ballywilliam North	150	Connello Lower	Rathkeale	Rathkeale
Ballywilliam South	259	Connello Lower	Rathkeale	Rathkeale
Ballywinterrourke	478	Connello Lower	Rathkeale	Rathkeale
Ballywinterrourkewood	348	Connello Lower	Rathkeale	Rathkeale
Banemore	402	Glenquin	Killeedy	Newcastle
Banemore	74	Clanwilliam	St. Nicholas	Limerick
Bansha	104	Kenry	Kilcornan	Rathkeale
Barna	970	Coshlea	Galbally	Mitchelstown
Barnagarrane	495	Glenquin	Killagholehane	Newcastle
Barnakyle	394	Pubblebrien	Mungret	Limerick
Barrysfarm	99	Smallcounty	Hospital	Kilmallock
Baskethill	226	Clanwilliam	Caherconlish	Limerick
Baunacloka	124	Pubblebrien	Mungret	Limerick
Baunatlea	59	Coshlea	Ballingaddy	Kilmallock
Baunmore	494	Coshlea	Ballingaddy	Kilmallock
Baunnageeragh	159	Smallcounty	Uregare	Kilmallock
Baunreagh	117	Connello Lower	Askeaton	Rathkeale
Baunteen	431	Coshlea	Galbally	Mitchelstown
Bauraneag	691	Shanid	Dunmoylan	Newcastle
Baurnagurrahy	398	Coshlea	Galbally	Mitchelstown
Baurnalicka	449	Connello Upper	Adare	Rathkeale
Bawnacouma	227	Smallcounty	Kilpeacon	Croom
Bawnagh	140	Coshlea	Kilbreedy Major	Kilmallock
Bawntard North	205	Kilmallock	St. Peter's & St. Paul's	Kilmallock
Bawntard South	142	Kilmallock	St. Peter's & St. Paul's	Kilmallock
Beabus	270	Coshma	Drehidtarsna	Croom
Beagh	256	Kenry	Iveruss	Rathkeale
Bealduvroga	477	Connello Lower	Rathkeale	Croom
Beechmount Demesne	249	Connello Lower	Rathkeale	Rathkeale
Behanagh	320	Coshlea	Kilbeheny	Mitchelstown
Biddyford	241	Clanwilliam	Killeenagarriff	Limerick
Bilboa	847	Coonagh	Doon	Tipperary
Bishopsfield	21	Coshlea	Emlygrennan	Kilmallock
Blackabbey	103	Coshma	Adare	Croom
Blossomhill	296	Connello Lower	Rathkeale	Rathkeale
Blossomhill	164	Kenry	Kilcornan	Rathkeale
Boarheeny	103	Coonagh	Doon	Tipperary
Boarmanshill	569	Owneybeg	Abington	Limerick
Bohard	434	Connello Upper	Kilmeedy	Newcastle
Boher	308	Clanwilliam	Abington	Limerick
Boher	208	Coshlea	Kilbeheny	Mitchelstown
Boherboy	78	Kenry	Kilcornan	Rathkeale
Boherbraddagh	156	Connello Lower	Clonshire	Rathkeale
Bohercarron	317	Coshlea	Galbally	Mitchelstown
Boherdotia	169	Coonagh	Oola	Tipperary
Boherduff	164	Clanwilliam	Caherelly	Limerick
Bohereen	101	Clanwilliam	Donaghmore	Limerick
Bohereen	40	Clanwilliam	St. Nicholas	Limerick
Bohereenkyle	190	Coshlea	Ballingarry	Kilmallock
Bohergar	280	Clanwilliam	Abington	Limerick
Boherload	394	Clanwilliam	Caheravally	Limerick
Bohernagore	629	Coshlea	Ballingaddy	Kilmallock
Bohernagraga	185	Coonagh	Oola	Tipperary
Boherroe	242	Clanwilliam	Aglishcormick	Limerick
Boherroe	121	Clanwilliam	Grean	Limerick
Boherygeela	352	Smallcounty	Glenogra	Croom
Boherygeela	248	Smallcounty	Tullabracky	Croom
Bolane	281	Kenry	Kildimo	Rathkeale
Boola	408	Glenquin	Killagholehane	Newcastle
Boolaglass	464	Connello Lower	Nantinan	Rathkeale
Boolanlisheen	742	Coshlea	Galbally	Mitchelstown
Boolavoord	205	Smallcounty	Fedamore	Croom
Boskill	280	Clanwilliam	Caherconlish	Limerick
Bosnetstown	784	Coshlea	Kilfinnane	Kilmallock
Bottomstown	773	Smallcounty	Knockainy	Kilmallock
Boughilbo	505	Shanid	Kilcolman	Glin
Boulabally	211	Coshma	Adare	Croom
Brackbaun	351	Coshlea	Kilbeheny	Mitchelstown
Brackloon	66	Clanwilliam	Stradbally	Limerick
Brackloon	66	Coonagh	Tuoghcluggin	Tipperary
Brackvoan	118	Coshma	Bruff	Kilmallock
Brackyle	487	Coonagh	Oola	Tipperary
Breesheen North	116	Kilmallock	St. Peter's & St. Paul's	Kilmallock
Breesheen South	191	Kilmallock	St. Peter's & St. Paul's	Kilmallock
Brickfield	423	Coshlea	Effin	Kilmallock
Briska Beg	267	Pubblebrien	Kilkeedy	Limerick
Briska More	264	Pubblebrien	Kilkeedy	Limerick
Briskagh	462	Shanid	Kilmoylan	Glin
Brittas	274	Clanwilliam	Caherconlish	Limerick
**Broadford**	Town	Glenquin	Killagholehane	Newcastle
Brufea	49	Clanwilliam	Inch St. Lawrence	Limerick
**Bruff**	Town	Coshma	Bruff	Kilmallock
Bruff	398	Coshma	Bruff	Kilmallock
**Bruree**	Town	Connello Upper	Bruree	Kilmallock
Bruree	142	Connello Upper	Bruree	Kilmallock
Buffanoky	852	Owneybeg	Doon	Limerick
Bulgaden	139	Coshlea	Kilbreedy Major	Kilmallock
Bulgaden Eady	372	Coshlea	Kilbreedy Major	Kilmallock
Bulgadenhall	223	Smallcounty	Uregare	Kilmallock
Bullaun	70	Connello Lower	Nantinan	Rathkeale
Bunavie	253	Coonagh	Grean	Tipperary
Bunkey	112	Clanwilliam	Stradbally	Limerick
Bunkey	88	Clanwilliam	Killeenagarriff	Limerick
Bunlicky	169	Pubblebrien	Mungret	Limerick
Bushyisland	153	Kenry	Kilcornan	Rathkeale
Caher (Connell)	943	Glenquin	Abbeyfeale	Newcastle
Caher (Hayes)	716	Glenquin	Abbeyfeale	Newcastle
Caher (Lane)	885	Glenquin	Abbeyfeale	Newcastle
Caheragh	461	Shanid	Kilfergus	Glin
Caheranardrish	124	Pubblebrien	Mungret	Limerick
Caherass	268	Coshma	Croom	Croom
Caherclogh	199	Connello Upper	Corcomohide	Croom
**Caherconlish**	Town	Clanwilliam	Caherconlish	Limerick
Caherconlish	209	Clanwilliam	Caherconlish	Limerick
Caherconreafy	70	Clanwilliam	Aglishcormick	Limerick
Cahercorney	719	Smallcounty	Cahercorney	Kilmallock
Caherdavin	94	Pubblebrien	St. Munchin's	Limerick
Caherelly East	724	Clanwilliam	Caherelly	Limerick
Caherelly West	419	Clanwilliam	Caherelly	Limerick
Caherhenesy	235	Connello Upper	Ballingarry	Croom
Caherlevoy	1,715	Glenquin	Killeedy	Newcastle
Caherline	354	Clanwilliam	Ballybrood	Limerick
Cahermoyle	457	Shanid	Rathronan	Rathkeale
Cahernagh	475	Shanid	Dunmoylan	Glin
Cahernarry (Cripps)	218	Clanwilliam	Cahernarry	Limerick
Cahernarry (Keane)	259	Clanwilliam	Cahernarry	Limerick
Cahervally	60	Pubblebrien	Knocknagaul	Limerick
Cahirduff	388	Pubblebrien	Monasteranenagh	Croom
Cahirguillamore	427	Smallcounty	Glenogra	Croom
Cahirguillamore	238	Coshma	Tullabracky	Croom
Callahow	260	Connello Upper	Cloncrew	Newcastle
Callow	450	Connello Lower	Nantinan	Rathkeale
Camas	670	Glenquin	Monagay	Newcastle
Camas	398	Glenquin	Killeedy	Newcastle
Camas North	704	Smallcounty	Monasteranenagh	Croom
Camas South	438	Smallcounty	Monasteranenagh	Kilmallock
Camheen	185	Pubblebrien	Mungret	Limerick
Cantogher	150	Glenquin	Killeedy	Newcastle
**Cappagh**	Town	Connello Lower	Cappagh	Rathkeale
Cappagh	786	Connello Lower	Cappagh	Rathkeale
**Cappamore**	Town	Owneybeg	Tuogh	Limerick
Cappamore	190	Coonagh	Doon	Limerick
Cappanafaraha	244	Coshma	Bruree	Kilmallock
Cappanahanagh	648	Owneybeg	Abington	Limerick
Cappananty	529	Connello Upper	Corcomohide	Croom
Cappanihane	770	Connello Upper	Corcomohide	Croom
Cappanouk	983	Owneybeg	Abington	Limerick
Capparoe	55	Kenry	Adare	Croom
Cappercullen	358	Owneybeg	Abington	Limerick
Carheeny	228	Kenry	Kildimo	Rathkeale
Carnane	455	Smallcounty	Fedamore	Croom
Carrickittle	525	Smallcounty	Kilteely	Kilmallock
Carrig Beg	403	Coonagh	Castletown	Tipperary
Carrig East	135	Pubblebrien	Kilkeedy	Limerick
Carrig More	363	Coonagh	Castletown	Tipperary
Carrig West	612	Pubblebrien	Kilkeedy	Limerick
Carriganattin	134	Clanwilliam	Rochestown	Limerick
Carrigarreely	214	Clanwilliam	Caherconlish	Limerick
Carrigeen	673	Coshma	Dysert	Croom
Carrigeen	602	Coshlea	Kilbeheny	Mitchelstown
Carrigeen	307	Smallcounty	Monasteranenagh	Croom
Carrigeen Mountain	2,082	Coshlea	Kilbeheny	Mitchelstown
Carrigkerry	722	Shanid	Ardagh	Newcastle
Carrigmartin	195	Clanwilliam	Cahernarry	Limerick
Carrigogunnel	136	Pubblebrien	Kilkeedy	Limerick
Carrigparson	283	Clanwilliam	Carrigparson	Limerick
Carrons	316	Shanid	Kilcolman	Glin
Carrow	501	Coshlea	Kilbeheny	Mitchelstown
Carrow	278	Coshma	Croom	Croom
Carroward East	224	Connello Upper	Dromcolliher	Newcastle
Carroward West	420	Connello Upper	Dromcolliher	Newcastle
Carrowbane Beg	135	Shanid	Loghill	Glin
Carrowbane More	337	Shanid	Loghill	Glin
Carrowbreedoge	28	Shanid	Kilmoylan	Rathkeale
Carrowclogh	105	Shanid	Kilmoylan	Rathkeale
Carrowgar	127	Glenquin	Grange	Newcastle
Carrowkeel	21	Clanwilliam	Stradbally	Limerick
Carrowkeel	18	Clanwilliam	Killeenagarriff	Limerick
Carrowmore	330	Connello Upper	Cloncagh	Newcastle
Cartown	170	Kenry	Ardcanny	Rathkeale
Castle Demesne	96	Glenquin	Newcastle	Newcastle
Castlecluggin	127	Coonagh	Tuoghcluggin	Tipperary
**Castleconnell**	Town	Clanwilliam	Stradbally	Limerick
Castlecreagh	250	Coshlea	Galbally	Mitchelstown
Castle-erkin North	287	Clanwilliam	Caherconlish	Limerick
Castle-erkin South	246	Clanwilliam	Caherconlish	Limerick
Castlefarm	595	Smallcounty	Hospital	Kilmallock
Castlefarm	142	Smallcounty	Ballynamona	Kilmallock
Castlegarde	500	Coonagh	Doon	Tipperary
Castlegrey	129	Kenry	Kilcornan	Rathkeale
Castlelloyd	95	Coonagh	Oola	Tipperary
Castlematrix	228	Connello Lower	Rathkeale	Rathkeale
Castlemungret	327	Pubblebrien	Mungret	Limerick
Castleoliver	786	Coshlea	Particles	Kilmallock
Castlequarter	254	Coshlea	Kilbeheny	Mitchelstown
Castlequarter	197	Smallcounty	Fedamore	Croom
Castleroberts	783	Coshma	Adare	Croom
Castletown	1,472	Connello Upper	Corcomohide	Croom
Castletown	433	Kenry	Kilcornan	Rathkeale
Castletroy	293	Clanwilliam	Kilmurry	Limerick
Churchfield	100	Shanid	Shanagolden	Rathkeale
Churchquarter	99	Coshlea	Kilbeheny	Mitchelstown
**Churchtown**	Town	Glenquin	Newcastle	Newcastle
Churchtown	560	Glenquin	Newcastle	Newcastle
Clash North	810	Shanid	Rathronan	Newcastle
Clash South	584	Shanid	Rathronan	Newcastle
Clashanea	90	Coonagh	Oola	Tipperary
Clashbane	210	Clanwilliam	Caherconlish	Limerick
Clashganniff	281	Shanid	Kilmoylan	Glin
Clashganniff	57	Shanid	Shanagolden	Glin
Clashgortmore	279	Connello Upper	Corcomohide	Kilmallock
Cleanglass North	1,120	Glenquin	Killeedy	Newcastle
Cleanglass South	691	Glenquin	Killeedy	Newcastle
Clogh East	233	Connello Lower	Croagh	Rathkeale
Clogh West	298	Connello Lower	Croagh	Rathkeale
Cloghacloka	339	Pubblebrien	Mungret	Limerick
Cloghadalton	62	Coonagh	Oola	Tipperary
Cloghaderreen	402	Coonagh	Grean	Tipperary
Cloghadoolarty North	297	Smallcounty	Fedamore	Croom
Cloghadoolarty South	104	Smallcounty	Fedamore	Croom
Cloghanarold	244	Connello Lower	Doondonnell	Rathkeale
Cloghaready North	14	Coonagh	Templebredon	Tipperary
Cloghaready South	13	Coonagh	Templebredon	Tipperary
Cloghast	336	Coshlea	Ballingarry	Kilmallock
Cloghatacka	190	Pubblebrien	Kilkeedy	Limerick
Cloghatrida	313	Connello Lower	Rathkeale	Rathkeale
Cloghaviller	345	Smallcounty	Ballinard	Kilmallock
Clogher	88	Coonagh	Doon	Tipperary
Clogher East	695	Coshma	Dromin	Kilmallock
Clogher West	369	Coshma	Dromin	Kilmallock
Cloghilawarreela	153	Coonagh	Templebredon	Tipperary
Cloghkeating	456	Pubblebrien	Mungret	Limerick
Cloghnadromin	554	Clanwilliam	Abington	Limerick
Cloghnamanagh	94	Smallcounty	Fedamore	Croom
Clonagh	353	Connello Lower	Clonagh	Rathkeale
Cloncagh	306	Connello Upper	Cloncagh	Newcastle
Clonconane	300	Pubblebrien	St. Munchin's	Limerick
Cloncrew	166	Connello Upper	Cloncrew	Newcastle
Clondrinagh	331	Pubblebrien	Killeely	Limerick
Clonkeen (Barrington)	290	Clanwilliam	Clonkeen	Limerick
Clonkeen (Molyneux)	214	Clanwilliam	Clonkeen	Limerick
Clonlong	36	Clanwilliam	St. Nicholas	Limerick
Clonloughna	119	Owneybeg	Abington	Limerick
Clonmacken	227	Pubblebrien	St. Munchin's	Limerick
Clonshavoy	24	Owneybeg	Abington	Limerick
Clonshire Beg	270	Connello Lower	Clonshire	Rathkeale
Clonshire More	218	Connello Lower	Clonshire	Rathkeale
Cloon and Commons	222	Clanwilliam	Stradbally	Limerick
Cloonaduff	50	Pubblebrien	Croom	Limerick
Cloonanna	661	Pubblebrien	Croom	Limerick
Cloonbrien	398	Coshma	Athlacca	Kilmallock
Clooncaura	51	Kenry	Kildimo	Rathkeale
Clooncon	371	Glenquin	Killeedy	Newcastle
Clooncon	77	Glenquin	Monagay	Newcastle
Clooncooravane North	145	Glenquin	Mahoonagh	Newcastle
Clooncooravane South	141	Glenquin	Mahoonagh	Newcastle
Clooncrippa	593	Connello Upper	Kilmeedy	Newcastle
Clooncunna North	220	Clanwilliam	Abington	Limerick
Clooncunna South	29	Clanwilliam	Abington	Limerick
Cloonee	435	Connello Upper	Corcomohide	Croom
Cloongownagh	460	Kenry	Adare	Croom
Cloonlahard East	802	Shanid	Kilmoylan	Glin
Cloonlahard West	728	Shanid	Kilmoylan	Glin
Cloonlara	180	Connello Upper	Cloncrew	Newcastle
Cloonlogue	178	Coshma	Kilbreedy Minor	Kilmallock
Cloonlusk	354	Coonagh	Doon	Tipperary
Cloonmore	731	Glenquin	Mahoonagh	Newcastle
Cloonnagalleen	313	Kenry	Kilcornan	Rathkeale
Cloonoughter	636	Shanid	Kilfergus	Glin
Cloonoul	181	Connello Lower	Cappagh	Rathkeale
Cloonpasteen	419	Connello Upper	Kilmeedy	Newcastle
Cloonreask	245	Connello Lower	Askeaton	Rathkeale
Cloonreask	128	Connello Lower	Tomdeely	Rathkeale
Cloonregan	119	Connello Upper	Ballingarry	Croom
Cloonroosk	287	Connello Upper	Kilmeedy	Newcastle
Cloonsherick	166	Glenquin	Mahoonagh	Newcastle
Cloonsherick	108	Glenquin	Killeedy	Newcastle
Cloonteen	357	Coonagh	Doon	Tipperary
Cloontemple	72	Connello Upper	Ballingarry	Croom
Cloonty	458	Shanid	Shanagolden	Glin
Cloonty	401	Shanid	Kilmoylan	Glin
Cloonyclohassy	170	Shanid	Kilmoylan	Glin
Cloonygarra	238	Coshma	Dromin	Kilmallock
Cloonyscrehane	196	Glenquin	Monagay	Newcastle
Cloonyscrehane	102	Glenquin	Grange	Newcastle
Clorane	347	Coshma	Croom	Croom
Clorhane	470	Kenry	Adare	Croom
Cloverfield	171	Clanwilliam	Aglishcormick	Limerick
Clovers	309	Coshlea	Kilflyn	Kilmallock
Cluggin	115	Coonagh	Tuoghcluggin	Tipperary
Clyduff East	66	Clanwilliam	Killeenagarriff	Limerick
Clyduff West	32	Clanwilliam	Killeenagarriff	Limerick
Clynabroga	26	Coonagh	Templebredon	Tipperary
Common	653	Connello Upper	Ballingarry	Croom
Commons	97	Connello Upper	Kilfinny	Rathkeale
Commons	89	Shanid	Ardagh	Newcastle
Commons	17	Connello Upper	Adare	Rathkeale
Commons	16	Connello Upper	Drehidtarsna	Rathkeale
Commons	15	Coshma	Effin	Kilmallock
Commons and Cloon	222	Clanwilliam	Stradbally	Limerick
Conigar	513	Pubblebrien	Mungret	Limerick
Conigar	267	Connello Lower	Lismakeery	Rathkeale
Cooga Lower	541	Coonagh	Doon	Tipperary
Cooga Upper	307	Coonagh	Doon	Tipperary
Cool	116	Coonagh	Kilteely	Kilmallock
Cool East	713	Shanid	Rathronan	Newcastle
Cool West	643	Shanid	Rathronan	Newcastle
Coolaboy	304	Connello Upper	Dromcolliher	Newcastle
Coolacokery	440	Shanid	Ardagh	Newcastle
Coolagowan	323	Connello Upper	Corcomohide	Croom
Coolaleen	450	Glenquin	Killeedy	Newcastle
Coolalough	454	Smallcounty	Hospital	Kilmallock
Coolanoran	805	Connello Lower	Kilscannell	Rathkeale
Coolatin	198	Coshlea	Kilbeheny	Mitchelstown
Coolavehy	569	Coshlea	Kilflyn	Kilmallock
Coolballyshane	292	Connello Lower	Clonshire	Rathkeale
Coolbane	94	Clanwilliam	Stradbally	Limerick
Coolbaun	458	Coonagh	Castletown	Tipperary
Coolbaun	61	Kenry	Adare	Croom
Coolbeg	181	Kenry	Kildimo	Rathkeale
Coolboy	650	Coshlea	Kilbeheny	Mitchelstown
Coolboy	222	Coshlea	Athlacca	Kilmallock
Coolbreedeen	258	Owneybeg	Abington	Limerick
Coolcappagh	159	Connello Lower	Clonagh	Rathkeale
Coolcronoge	56	Shanid	Ardagh	Newcastle
Cooleen	88	Coshma	Bruree	Kilmallock
Coolfree	1,018	Coshlea	Kilflyn	Kilmallock
Coolfune	144	Smallcounty	Glenogra	Croom
Coolishal	61	Clanwilliam	Carrigparson	Limerick
Cooliska	287	Glenquin	Mahoonagh	Newcastle
Coolnadown	145	Coonagh	Templebredon	Tipperary
Coolnahila (Palmer)	271	Owneybeg	Abington	Limerick
Coolnahila (Powell)	199	Owneybeg	Abington	Limerick
Coolnaknockane	155	Connello Upper	Cloncrew	Newcastle
Coolnamohoge	517	Coshlea	Kilbeheny	Mitchelstown
Coolnamona	363	Coonagh	Castletown	Tipperary
Coolnanoglagh	289	Glenquin	Monagay	Newcastle
Coolnapisha	357	Coonagh	Oola	Tipperary
Coolnapisha	130	Coonagh	Doon	Tipperary
Coolnashamroge	196	Clanwilliam	Aglishcormick	Limerick
Coologe	231	Coonagh	Grean	Tipperary
Coologe	23	Pubblebrien	Croom	Croom
Coolrahnee	208	Connello Lower	Askeaton	Rathkeale
Coolraine	216	Pubblebrien	St. Munchin's	Limerick
Coolready	383	Clanwilliam	Stradbally	Limerick
Coolreagh	306	Connello Upper	Bruree	Kilmallock
Coolreagh	60	Clanwilliam	Cahernarry	Limerick
Coolreiry	149	Clanwilliam	Stradbally	Limerick
Coolroe	115	Kilmallock	St. Peter's & St. Paul's	Kilmallock
Coolrus	1,030	Connello Upper	Ballingarry	Croom
Coolscart	175	Smallcounty	Hospital	Kilmallock
Cooltomin	567	Shanid	Kilbradran	Rathkeale
Coolybrown	177	Connello Lower	Kilscannell	Rathkeale
Coolygorman	227	Glenquin	Mahoonagh	Newcastle
Coolyhenan	347	Clanwilliam	Derrygalvin	Limerick
Coolyroe	168	Glenquin	Mahoonagh	Newcastle
Coombs	780	Coshlea	Ballingaddy	Kilmallock
Coonagh East	270	Pubblebrien	Killeely	Limerick
Coonagh West	548	Pubblebrien	Killeely	Limerick
Cooperhill	524	Pubblebrien	Killeely	Limerick
Copay	27	Kenry	Adare	Croom
Corbally	321	Limerick, Muni. Borough of	St. Patrick's	Limerick
Corbally	156	Shanid	Shanagolden	Glin
Corbally	122	Coshlea	Galbally	Mitchelstown
Corbally	39	Pubblebrien	Kilkeedy	Limerick
Corcamore	1,346	Pubblebrien	Killeedy	Limerick
Corelish East	169	Coonagh	Grean	Tipperary
Corelish West	266	Clanwilliam	Grean	Tipperary
Corgrig	357	Shanid	Robertstown	Glin
Corkanree	124	Pubblebrien	St. Michael's	Limerick
Corrabul	139	Pubblebrien	Croom	Croom
Corrabulbeg	60	Pubblebrien	Croom	Croom
Correenfeeradda	32	Smallcounty	Knockainy	Kilmallock
Cottage	137	Smallcounty	Uregare	Kilmallock
Court	697	Kenry	Kildimo	Rathkeale
Court	98	Shanid	Kilfergus	Glin
Courtbrack	264	Pubblebrien	St. Michael's	Limerick
Courtbrown	596	Connello Lower	Askeaton	Rathkeale
Courtmatrix	390	Connello Lower	Rathkeale	Rathkeale
Cowpark	188	Kenry	Kilcornan	Rathkeale
Crabbs-land	34	Clanwilliam	St. Nicholas	Limerick
Crag	672	Glenquin	Abbeyfeale	Newcastle
Cragbeg	261	Pubblebrien	Kilkeedy	Limerick
Cragganacree	129	Kenry	Kildimo	Rathkeale
Craggard	180	Shanid	Kilmoylan	Rathkeale
Craggs	383	Shanid	Kilmoylan	Rathkeale
Craggs	141	Shanid	Robertstown	Rathkeale
Cragmore	623	Connello Lower	Askeaton	Rathkeale
Cragreagh	90	Kenry	Kilcornan	Rathkeale
Crataloe East	783	Shanid	Rathronan	Newcastle
Crataloe West	777	Shanid	Rathronan	Newcastle
Crean	777	Smallcounty	Glenogra	Croom
Crean	619	Smallcounty	Tullabracky	Croom
Crean	202	Glenquin	Monagay	Newcastle
Creevebeg	81	Coshma	Croom	Croom
Creeves	259	Connello Lower	Lismakeery	Rathkeale
Creeves	241	Shanid	Dunmoylan	Rathkeale
Creggane	972	Coshma	Hackmys	Kilmallock
Crehaun	206	Coonagh	Doon	Tipperary
**Croagh**	Town	Connello Lower	Croagh	Rathkeale
Croagh	684	Connello Lower	Croagh	Rathkeale
Croagh Commons	50	Connello Lower	Croagh	Rathkeale
Croaghane	94	Shanid	Robertstown	Glin
Croaghane	73	Shanid	Shanagolden	Glin
Croghteen	257	Connello Upper	Corcomohide	Croom
Crokerspark	205	Kenry	Kilcornan	Rathkeale
Cromwell	733	Smallcounty	Ballinlough	Kilmallock
Croom	900	Coshma	Croom	Croom
Cross	353	Coonagh	Tuoghcluggin	Tipperary
Cross	45	Shanid	Ardagh	Newcastle
Crossagalla	243	Clanwilliam	St. Nicholas	Limerick
Crusheenkeenoge	39	Shanid	Ardagh	Newcastle
Cullamus	85	Kilmallock	St. Peter's & St. Paul's	Kilmallock
Cullane Middle	491	Coshlea	Ballylanders	Mitchelstown
Cullane North	638	Coshlea	Ballylanders	Mitchelstown
Cullane South	747	Coshlea	Ballylanders	Mitchelstown
Cullenagh	330	Owneybeg	Doon	Limerick
Cullenagh	265	Glenquin	Monagay	Newcastle
Cummeen	109	Coshma	Adare	Croom
Cunnagavale	235	Owneybeg	Tuogh	Limerick
Cunnihee	132	Clanwilliam	Carrigparson	Limerick
Curmweela	1	Connello Lower	Morgans	Rathkeale
Curra Beg	133	Shanid	Loghill	Glin
Curra More	332	Shanid	Loghill	Glin
Curragh	566	Glenquin	Mahoonagh	Newcastle
Curragh	97	Clanwilliam	Killeenagarriff	Limerick
Curraghafoil	947	Coonagh	Doon	Tipperary
Curraghakimikeen	563	Coonagh	Doon	Tipperary
Curraghaveara	67	Clanwilliam	Grean	Limerick
Curraghbeg	121	Kenry	Adare	Croom
Curraghbridge	435	Kenry	Adare	Croom
Curraghkilbran	282	Coshlea	Galbally	Mitchelstown
Curraghlahan	516	Coonagh	Doon	Tipperary
Curraghnaboul	83	Clanwilliam	Dromkeen	Limerick
Curraghnadeely	48	Connello Lower	Nantinan	Rathkeale
Curraghroche	396	Coshlea	Galbally	Mitchelstown
Curraghturk	794	Coshlea	Ballylanders	Mitchelstown
Currahchase	593	Kenry	Kilcornan	Rathkeale
Currahchase	512	Kenry	Adare	Rathkeale
Currahchase North	283	Kenry	Kilcornan	Rathkeale
Curraheen	158	Kenry	Kildimo	Rathkeale
Curraheen North	166	Connello Lower	Nantinan	Rathkeale
Curraheen South	100	Connello Lower	Nantinan	Rathkeale
Cush	795	Coshlea	Emlygrennan	Kilmallock
Danganbeg	211	Glenquin	Mahoonagh	Newcastle
Darkisland	70	Coonagh	Doon	Tipperary
Darragh Beg	336	Coshlea	Darragh	Kilmallock
Darragh More	485	Coshlea	Darragh	Kilmallock
Darranstown	733	Coshlea	Emlygrennan	Kilmallock
Darrery	426	Glenquin	Killeedy	Newcastle
Deanery-land	16	Limerick, Muni. Borough of	St. Nicholas	Limerick
Deanstown	116	Connello Lower	Cappagh	Rathkeale
Deebert	129	Kilmallock	St. Peter's & St. Paul's	Kilmallock
Deegerty	215	Kenry	Kilcornan	Rathkeale
Deelish	140	Shanid	Kilmoylan	Rathkeale
Deelish	49	Connello Lower	Clonagh	Rathkeale
Deerpark	317	Coshlea	Galbally	Mitchelstown
Deerpark	75	Clanwilliam	Dromkeen	Limerick
Deerpark	44	Clanwilliam	Grean	Limerick
Derk	372	Coonagh	Grean	Tipperary
Derraulin	597	Connello Upper	Corcomohide	Croom
Derreen	1,330	Shanid	Nantinan	Glin
Derreen	184	Kenry	Kilcornan	Rathkeale
Derreen	82	Clanwilliam	Stradbally	Limerick
Derry	147	Connello Lower	Nantinan	Rathkeale
Derrybeg	152	Pubblebrien	Knocknagaul	Limerick
Derryhasna	204	Clanwilliam	Stradbally	Limerick
Derryknockane	349	Pubblebrien	Knocknagaul	Limerick
Derrylusk	114	Clanwilliam	Stradbally	Limerick
Derryvinnane	163	Coshma	Adare	Croom
Dohora	558	Coshma	Croom	Croom
Dohora	236	Coshma	Anhid	Croom
Dollas	126	Connello Upper	Ballingarry	Croom
Dollas Lower	245	Coshma	Croom	Croom
Dollas Upper	466	Coshma	Croom	Croom
Dooally	399	Glenquin	Newcastle	Newcastle
Doocatteen	200	Glenquin	Newcastle	Newcastle
Doohyle Beg	188	Connello Lower	Nantinan	Rathkeale
Doohyle More	159	Connello Lower	Nantinan	Rathkeale
**Doon**	Town	Coonagh	Doon	Tipperary
Doon	41	Pubblebrien	Kilkeedy	Limerick
Doon North	888	Coonagh	Doon	Tipperary
Doon South	873	Coonagh	Doon	Tipperary
Doonakenna	418	Glenquin	Monagay	Newcastle
Doonbeirne	217	Connello Lower	Rathkeale	Croom
Dooncaha	611	Shanid	Dunmoylan	Glin
Dooneen	376	Pubblebrien	Crecora	Croom
Dooneen Upper	60	Pubblebrien	Crecora	Croom
Doonmoon	205	Coshlea	Knocklong	Kilmallock
Doonskerdeen	125	Shanid	Robertstown	Glin
Doonvullen Lower	256	Clanwilliam	Ballybrood	Limerick
Doonvullen Upper	350	Clanwilliam	Ballybrood	Limerick
Dooradoyle	467	Pubblebrien	Mungret	Limerick
Doorlus	172	Connello Upper	Ballingarry	Croom
Downs	174	Connello Upper	Ballingarry	Croom
Dreenaan	64	Connello Upper	Corcomohide	Croom
Drehidtarsna	244	Coshma	Drehidtarsna	Rathkeale
Drewscourt East	991	Connello Upper	Corcomohide	Croom
Drewscourt West	627	Connello Upper	Corcomohide	Croom
Dromacummer East	220	Coshma	Bruree	Kilmallock
Dromacummer West	193	Coshma	Bruree	Kilmallock
Dromada	185	Shanid	Rathronan	Newcastle
Dromagarraun	281	Shanid	Kilmoylan	Glin
Dromalta	322	Owneybeg	Tuogh	Limerick
Dromard Demesne	713	Connello Lower	Rathkeale	Rathkeale
Drombane	229	Clanwilliam	Grean	Limerick
Drombanny	560	Clanwilliam	Caheravally	Limerick
Drombanny	483	Clanwilliam	Cahernarry	Limerick
Drombanny	355	Clanwilliam	Donaghmore	Limerick
Drombeg	574	Smallcounty	Glenogra	Croom
Dromcluher	292	Owneybeg	Tuogh	Limerick
**Dromcolliher**	Town	Connello Upper	Dromcolliher	Newcastle
Dromdarrig	146	Pubblebrien	Mungret	Limerick
Dromdeeveen	982	Glenquin	Monagay	Newcastle
Dromeenboy	152	Coonagh	Grean	Tipperary
Dromeliagh	671	Owneybeg	Abington	Limerick
Dromin	378	Glenquin	Grange	Newcastle
Dromin (Beeson)	303	Glenquin	Newcastle	Newcastle
Dromin (Macturlogh)	369	Glenquin	Newcastle	Newcastle
Dromin North	175	Coshma	Dromin	Kilmallock
Dromin South	247	Coshma	Dromin	Kilmallock
Drominaclara	106	Kenry	Kilcornan	Rathkeale
Drominacreen	425	Connello Upper	Kilmeedy	Newcastle
Drominboy	91	Clanwilliam	Stradbally	Limerick
Drominboy Lower	162	Clanwilliam	Killeenagarriff	Limerick
Drominboy Upper	90	Clanwilliam	Killeenagarriff	Limerick
Drominoona	109	Kenry	Iveruss	Rathkeale
Drominycarra	201	Smallcounty	Fedamore	Croom
Drominycullane	51	Kenry	Iveruss	Rathkeale
Dromkeen	112	Clanwilliam	Grean	Limerick
Dromkeen North	164	Clanwilliam	Dromkeen	Limerick
Dromkeen South	152	Clanwilliam	Dromkeen	Limerick
Dromlara	352	Coonagh	Grean	Limerick
Dromlohan	375	Kenry	Kilcornan	Rathkeale
Dromloughan north	142	Pubblebrien	Killeenoghty	Croom
Dromloughan South	68	Pubblebrien	Killeenoghty	Croom
Drommoher	129	Kenry	Kilcornan	Rathkeale
Dromore	48	Kenry	Kildimo	Rathkeale
Dromrahnee	105	Shanid	Ardagh	Newcastle
Dromreask	775	Shanid	Kilfergus	Glin
Dromroe	729	Glenquin	Monagay	Newcastle
Dromroe	151	Clanwilliam	Kilmurry	Limerick
Dromsallagh	851	Owneybeg	Tuogh	Limerick
Dromtrasna (Collins)	1,610	Glenquin	Abbeyfeale	Newcastle
Dromtrasna (Hartnett)	865	Glenquin	Abbeyfeale	Newcastle
Dromtrasna North	656	Glenquin	Abbeyfeale	Newcastle
Dromtrasna South	967	Glenquin	Abbeyfeale	Newcastle
Dromturk	72	Connello Lower	Kilbradran	Rathkeale
Duckstown	788	Connello Lower	Rathkeale	Rathkeale
Dunganville Lower	137	Glenquin	Newcastle	Newcastle
Dunganville Upper	241	Glenquin	Newcastle	Newcastle
Dungeeha	173	Glenquin	Newcastle	Newcastle
Dungeeha	130	Glenquin	Grange	Newcastle
Dunkip	574	Coshma	Croom	Croom
Dunmoylan	433	Shanid	Dunmoylan	Glin
Dunmoylan	180	Shanid	Kilmoylan	Glin
Dunnaman	1,521	Coshma	Croom	Croom
Duntryleague	764	Coshlea	Galbally	Mitchelstown
Durnish	181	Shanid	Robertstown	Glin
Durraclogh	443	Connello Upper	Ballingarry	Croom
Dysert	84	Shanid	Robertstown	Rathkeale
Edwardstown	103	Clanwilliam	Cahernarry	Limerick
Effin	737	Coshma	Effin	Kilmallock
Ellaha	100	Shanid	Robertstown	Rathkeale
Elmpark Demesne	318	Pubblebrien	Kilkeedy	Limerick
Elton	739	Smallcounty	Knockainy	Kilmallock
Enaghgare	96	Shanid	Ardagh	Newcastle
Enaghroe	223	Smallcounty	Fedamore	Croom
Englishtenements	81	Connello Lower	Rathkeale	Rathkeale
Englishtown	34	Borough of Limerick	St. Mary's	Limerick
Enniscoush	344	Connello Upper	Rathkeale	Rathkeale
Enniscoush	57	Connello Upper	Nantinan	Rathkeale
Evegallahoo	211	Glenquin	Grange	Newcastle
Eyon	542	Clanwilliam	Abington	Limerick
Faha	228	Kenry	Kildimo	Rathkeale
Faha Demesne	428	Pubblebrien	Kilkeedy	Limerick
Fahanasoodry	411	Coshlea	Ballylanders	Mitchelstown
Fairhall	105	Clanwilliam	Stradbally	Limerick
Fairyfield Glebe	55	Kilmallock	St. Peter's & St. Paul's	Kilmallock
Falleenadatha	332	Owneybeg	Doon	Limerick
Fanningstown	1,049	Smallcounty	Fedamore	Croom
Fanningstown	604	Coshlea	Particles	Kilmallock
Fanningstown	544	Coshma	Adare	Croom
Fantstown	366	Coshlea	Kilbreedy Major	Kilmallock
Farnane	431	Owneybeg	Abington	Limerick
Farnanefranklin	605	Owneybeg	Doon	Limerick
Farranafina	74	Coonagh	Oola	Tipperary
Farranatlaba	197	Shanid	Ardagh	Newcastle
Farranmiller	106	Shanid	Kilfergus	Glin
Farranshone Beg	34	Pubblebrien and Muni. Borough	St. Nicholas	Limerick
Farranshone More	232	Pubblebrien and Muni. Borough	St. Nicholas	Limerick
Farrihy	1,030	Glenquin	Killagholehane	Newcastle
Fawnamore	209	Shanid	Robertstown	Rathkeale
Fawnlehane	464	Glenquin	Mahoonagh	Newcastle
Fearoe	146	Pubblebrien	Killeenoghty	Croom
**Fedamore**	Town	Smallcounty	Fedamore	Croom
Fedamore	188	Smallcounty	Fedamore	Croom
Feeagh	103	Connello Lower	Nantinan	Rathkeale
**Feenagh**	Town	Connello Upper	Kilmeedy	Newcastle
Feenagh	455	Connello Upper	Kilmeedy	Newcastle
Feloree	70	Clanwilliam	Aglishcormick	Limerick
Feohanagh	1,196	Glenquin	Mahoonagh	Newcastle
Fihidy	368	Connello Lower	Croagh	Rathkeale
Finniterstown	536	Connello Upper	Adare	Rathkeale
Finniterstown	438	Connello Upper	Drehidtarsna	Rathkeale
Finnoo	671	Shanid	Kilmoylan	Glin
Flankerhouse	14	Clanwilliam	St. Nicholas	Limerick
Flean Beg	112	Shanid	Kilfergus	Glin
Flean More	1,031	Shanid	Kilfergus	Glin
Flemingstown	284	Coshlea	Ballingaddy	Kilmallock
Foilycleara	408	Coonagh	Doon	Tipperary
Forkeala	1,090	Owneybeg	Abington	Limerick
Fort East	570	Connello Upper	Colmanswell	Kilmallock
Fort Middle	836	Connello Upper	Colmanswell	Kilmallock
Fort West	474	Connello Upper	Colmanswell	Kilmallock
Fortetna	175	Pubblebrien	Killonahan	Croom
Fortyacres	66	Connello Upper	Bruree	Kilmallock
Foxhall East	289	Connello Upper	Colmanswell	Kilmallock
Foxhall West	316	Connello Upper	Colmanswell	Kilmallock
Foyle	115	Clanwilliam	Killeenagarriff	Limerick
**Foynes**	Town	Shanid	Robertstown	Glin
Foynes Island	293	Shanid	Robertstown	Glin
Frankfort	518	Connello Upper	Ballingarry	Newcastle
Friarstown	512	Clanwilliam	Rochestown	Limerick
Friarstown	415	Clanwilliam	Caheravally	Limerick
Friarstown	166	Clanwilliam	Caherelly	Limerick
Friarstown	70	Clanwilliam	Fedamore	Limerick
Friarstown North	314	Smallcounty	Fedamore	Croom
Friarstown South	65	Smallcounty	Fedamore	Limerick
**Galbally**	Town	Coshlea	Galbally	Mitchelstown
Galbally	240	Coshlea	Galbally	Mitchelstown
Galboola	250	Clanwilliam	Rathjordan	Limerick
Galvone	48	Clanwilliam	St. Nicholas	Limerick
Galway	183	Connello Lower	Askeaton	Rathkeale
Gannavane	378	Coonagh	Doon	Tipperary
Gannavane Upper	528	Owneybeg	Doon	Limerick
Garbally	429	Connello Upper	Kilmeedy	Newcastle
Garbally	171	Coshma	Dromin	Kilmallock
Garbally	73	Glenquin	Mahoonagh	Newcastle
Garbally	46	Coshma	Bruff	Kilmallock
Gardenfield	429	Glenquin	Monagay	Newcastle
Gardenfield East	157	Connello Upper	Dromcolliher	Newcastle
Gardenfield South	329	Connello Upper	Dromcolliher	Newcastle
Gardenfield West	159	Connello Upper	Dromcolliher	Newcastle
Gardenhill	538	Clanwilliam	Stradbally	Limerick
Gardenhill	5	Clanwilliam	Killeenagarriff	Limerick
Garranard	167	Kenry	Kilcornan	Rathkeale
Garranbane	927	Owneybeg	Abington	Limerick
Garranboy	258	Connello Lower	Clonshire	Rathkeale
Garrane	657	Pubblebrien	Monasteranenagh	Croom
Garrane	506	Connello Upper	Bruree	Kilmallock
Garrane	504	Glenquin	Mahoonagh	Newcastle
Garrane Beg	32	Coonagh	Grean	Tipperary
Garrane More	198	Coonagh	Grean	Tipperary
Garranekeagh	270	Coshma	Effin	Kilmallock
Garranekeevan	180	Glenquin	Newcastle	Newcastle
Garranroe	370	Coshma	Killonahan	Croom
Garraun	67	Clanwilliam	Killeenagarriff	Limerick
Garraunykee	90	Clanwilliam	Killeenagarriff	Limerick
Garraunykee	88	Clanwilliam	Stradbally	Limerick
Garravin	268	Coonagh	Tuoghcluggin	Tipperary
Garrison	147	Coonagh	Grean	Tipperary
Garroose	773	Connello Upper	Bruree	Kilmallock
Garryarthur	625	Coshlea	Kilflyn	Kilmallock
Garrydoolis	355	Coonagh	Templebredon	Tipperary
Garryduff	1,083	Glenquin	Monagay	Newcastle
Garryduff	133	Coonagh	Oola	Tipperary
Garryduff	93	Glenquin	Mahoonagh	Newcastle
Garryduff	59	Clanwilliam	Caherconlish	Limerick
Garryellen	304	Smallcounty	Fedamore	Croom
Garryfine	1,024	Connello Upper	Bruree	Kilmallock
Garryfrask	151	Coonagh	Tuoghcluggin	Tipperary
Garryglass	120	Clanwilliam	Derrygalvin	Limerick
Garryheakin	222	Coonagh	Oola	Tipperary
Garrymore	163	Clanwilliam	Killeenagarriff	Limerick
Garrynagoord	90	Clanwilliam	Aglishcormick	Limerick
Garrynalyna	284	Coshlea	Galbally	Mitchelstown
Garryncahera	334	Smallcounty	Ballinlough	Kilmallock
Garryncoonagh North	612	Coshlea	Effin	Kilmallock
Garryncoonagh South	155	Coshlea	Effin	Kilmallock
Garrynderk North	501	Coshma	Effin	Kilmallock
Garrynderk South	358	Coshma	Effin	Kilmallock
Garrynlease	124	Coshlea	Kilfinnane	Kilmallock
Garrynoe	109	Kilmallock	St. Peter's & St. Paul's	Kilmallock
**Garryspellane**	Town	Coshlea	Ballyscaddan	Kilmallock
Garryvurragha	272	Coshlea	Kilbeheny	Mitchelstown
Geeragh	423	Coshlea	Kilbeheny	Mitchelstown
Gibbonstown	465	Coshlea	Kilbreedy Major	Kilmallock
Gibbonstown	91	Coshlea	Athneasy	Kilmallock
Glascurram	213	Pubblebrien	Kilkeedy	Limerick
Glashapullagh	490	Shanid	Kilmoylan	Glin
Glebe	86	Glenquin	Monagay	Newcastle
Glebe	70	Pubblebrien	Kilkeedy	Limerick
Glebe	44	Glenquin	Killeedy	Newcastle
Glebe	41	Coonagh	Oola	Tipperary
Glebe	30	Coshma	Drehidtarsna	Croom
Glebe	29	Pubblebrien	Crecora	Croom
Glebe	20	Limerick, Muni. Borough of	Killeely	Limerick
Glen	249	Clanwilliam	Cahernarry	Limerick
Glen	128	Coonagh	Grean	Tipperary
Glenacurrane	422	Coshlea	Kilbeheny	Mitchelstown
Glenagower	809	Shanid	Rathronan	Newcastle
Glenagragara	1,125	Shanid	Kilfergus	Glin
Glenanair East	1,322	Coshlea	Particles	Kilmallock
Glenanair West	1,151	Coshlea	Particles	Kilmallock
Glenaree	360	Coshlea	Ballingarry	Kilmallock
Glenastar	788	Glenquin	Newcastle	Newcastle
Glenbane East	260	Shanid	Shanagolden	Rathkeale
Glenbane West	73	Shanid	Shanagolden	Rathkeale
Glenbaun	1,424	Shanid	Kilmoylan	Glin
Glenbevan	173	Coshma	Croom	Croom
Glenbrohane	230	Coshlea	Ballingarry	Kilmallock
Glendarragh	1,042	Glenquin	Monagay	Newcastle
Glendiheen	199	Shanid	Rathronan	Glin
Glenduff	879	Glenquin	Monagay	Newcastle
Glenfield	428	Kilmallock	St. Peter's & St. Paul's	Kilmallock
Glengort North	697	Glenquin	Killeedy	Newcastle
Glengort South	1,507	Glenquin	Killeedy	Newcastle
Glenlary	813	Coshlea	Ballingarry	Kilmallock
Glenma	154	Coshma	Athlacca	Kilmallock
Glenmore	86	Glenquin	Monagay	Newcastle
Glenmore East	731	Glenquin	Killeedy	Newcastle
Glenmore West	320	Glenquin	Killeedy	Newcastle
Glennagowan	271	Glenquin	Newcastle	Newcastle
Glennahaglish	427	Coshlea	Ballylanders	Mitchelstown
Glennameade	483	Kenry	Kildimo	Rathkeale
Gleno	760	Owneybeg	Abington	Limerick
Gleno Knocklatteragh	144	Owneybeg	Abington	Limerick
Gleno Newtown	194	Owneybeg	Abington	Limerick
Glenogra	409	Smallcounty	Glenogra	Croom
Glenosheen	773	Coshlea	Particles	Kilmallock
Glenquin	712	Glenquin	Killeedy	Newcastle
Glenquin	203	Glenquin	Monagay	Newcastle
Glenquin South	332	Glenquin	Monagay	Newcastle
Glensharrold	1,220	Shanid	Rathronan	Newcastle
Glensharrold	996	Shanid	Kilcolman	Newcastle
Glenstal	1,084	Owneybeg	Abington	Limerick
Glenville	235	Shanid	Rathronan	Newcastle
Glenwilliam	552	Connello Upper	Ballingarry	Croom
**Glin**	Town	Shanid	Kilfergus	Glin
Glin Demesne	406	Shanid	Kilfergus	Glin
Goat Island	161	Coshma	Uregare	Kilmallock
Gooig	573	Clanwilliam	Stradbally	Limerick
Gormanstown	51	Smallcounty	Knockainy	Kilmallock
Gormanstown	48	Smallcounty	Uregare	Kilmallock
Gormanstown (Grady)	238	Smallcounty	Athneasy	Kilmallock
Gormanstown (Phillips)	292	Smallcounty	Athneasy	Kilmallock
Gortaclareen	173	Coonagh	Oola	Tipperary
Gortacloona	374	Smallcounty	Knockainy	Kilmallock
Gortacrank	27	Coshma	Effin	Kilmallock
Gortadroma	385	Shanid	Dunmoylan	Glin
Gortaganniff	62	Coshma	Adare	Croom
Gortakilleen	127	Coonagh	Oola	Tipperary
Gortalassa	282	Connello Upper	Kilmeedy	Newcastle
Gortavacoosh	127	Owneybeg	Abington	Limerick
Gortavalla East	318	Coonagh	Doon	Tipperary
Gortavalla North	310	Coonagh	Doon	Tipperary
Gortavalla South	561	Coonagh	Doon	Tipperary
Gortboy	163	Kilmallock	St. Peter's & St. Paul's	Kilmallock
Gortboy	114	Clanwilliam	Caherelly	Limerick
Gortboy	87	Glenquin	Grange	Newcastle
Gortboy	87	Glenquin	Newcastle	Newcastle
Gortbrien	85	Clanwilliam	Caherconlish	Limerick
Gorteen	533	Connello Upper	Kilmeedy	Newcastle
Gorteen	111	Glenquin	Mahoonagh	Newcastle
Gorteen	85	Glenquin	Killeedy	Newcastle
Gorteen	82	Connello Upper	Ballingarry	Croom
Gorteen	27	Pubblebrien	Croom	Limerick
Gorteen East	178	Connello Upper	Cloncagh	Newcastle
Gorteen West	119	Connello Upper	Cloncagh	Newcastle
Gorteennacreeagh	68	Smallcounty	Knockainy	Kilmallock
Gorteennamrock	85	Connello Lower	Nantinan	Rathkeale
Gorteennaskagh	296	Clanwilliam	Caherconlish	Limerick
Gorteenreynard	130	Glenquin	Monagay	Newcastle
Gorteens	129	Connello Upper	Kilbolane	Newcastle
Gortfadda	186	Connello Upper	Kilfinny	Croom
Gortgarralt	241	Smallcounty	Fedamore	Croom
Gortmanna	37	Coonagh	Doon	Tipperary
Gortmore	178	Connello Upper	Kilmeedy	Newcastle
Gortmore	133	Glenquin	Mahoonagh	Newcastle
Gortnaboola	18	Coonagh	Tuoghcluggin	Tipperary
Gortnaboola	8	Coonagh	Oola	Tipperary
Gortnaclohy	752	Glenquin	Killeedy	Newcastle
Gortnacoolagh	44	Coonagh	Grean	Tipperary
Gortnacreha Lower	509	Connello Upper	Cloncagh	Newcastle
Gortnacreha Upper	445	Connello Upper	Cloncagh	Newcastle
Gortnadromin	119	Clanwilliam	Dromkeen	Limerick
Gortnagarde	153	Coonagh	Doon	Tipperary
Gortnaglogh	6	Shanid	Newcastle	Newcastle
Gortnagluggin	235	Connello Upper	Kilmeedy	Newcastle
Gortnagross	870	Shanid	Rathronan	Newcastle
Gortnagrour	100	Connello Lower	Clonshire	Rathkeale
Gortnakistin	227	Coonagh	Doon	Tipperary
Gortnalahagh	24	Clanwilliam	Stradbally	Limerick
Gortnanuv	67	Coonagh	Ballynaclogh	Tipperary
Gortnascarry	197	Coonagh	Doon	Limerick
Gortnaskagh	72	Smallcounty	Kilcullane	Kilmallock
Gortnaskehy	262	Glenquin	Killeedy	Newcastle
Gortreagh	109	Connello Lower	Croagh	Rathkeale
Gortroe	565	Connello Upper	Corcomohide	Croom
Gortroe	323	Connello Upper	Colmanswell	Kilmallock
Gortroe	174	Glenquin	Grange	Newcastle
Gortroe	133	Connello Lower	Clonagh	Rathkeale
Gortskagh	347	Glenquin	Mahoonagh	Newcastle
Gortyknaveen	70	Glenquin	Monagay	Newcastle
Gortyvahane	181	Coonagh	Oola	Tipperary
Gotoon	279	Smallcounty	Hospital	Kilmallock
Gotoon	84	Coshlea	Ballingaddy	Kilmallock
Gouldavoher	211	Pubblebrien	Mungret	Limerick
Gragane	372	Clanwilliam	Caherconlish	Limerick
Graig	487	Connello Upper	Corcomohide	Croom
Graigacurragh	609	Connello Upper	Ballingarry	Croom
Graiganster	191	Kilmallock	St. Peter's & St. Paul's	Kilmallock
Graiganster	89	Coshma	Effin	Kilmallock
Graigbeg	219	Connello Upper	Ballingarry	Croom
Graigeen	122	Connello Lower	Nantinan	Rathkeale
Graigoor	178	Shanid	Kilbradran	Rathkeale
Graigue	296	Coshma	Adare	Croom
Graigue	118	Connello Lower	Rathkeale	Rathkeale
Graigue	71	Connello Lower	Clonshire	Rathkeale
Graigue	54	Connello Lower	Cappagh	Rathkeale
Graigues	232	Connello Lower	Nantinan	Rathkeale
Graigues	69	Kenry	Kilcornan	Rathkeale
Graiguesparling	137	Coshma	Adare	Croom
Granagh	366	Connello Upper	Ballingarry	Croom
Granard	140	Connello Upper	Croom	Croom
Grange	1,097	Smallcounty	Monasteranenagh	Croom
Grange	331	Coshlea	Knocklong	Kilmallock
Grange	296	Smallcounty	Tullabracky	Croom
Grange	111	Clanwilliam	Fedamore	Limerick
Grange East	200	Clanwilliam	Caherconlish	Limerick
Grange Lower	126	Clanwilliam	Killeenagarriff	Limerick
Grange Upper	288	Clanwilliam	Killeenagarriff	Limerick
Grange Upper	260	Glenquin	Grange	Newcastle
Grange West	157	Clanwilliam	Caherconlish	Limerick
Grass Island	2	Kenry	Ardcanny	Rathkeale
Greenane	236	Clanwilliam	Caherconlish	Limerick
Greenhills	574	Pubblebrien	Knocknagaul	Limerick
Greenish Island	46	Connello Lower	Tomdeely	Rathkeale
Greenmount	301	Pubblebrien	Crecora	Croom
Grillagh	281	Coshma	Tullabracky	Kilmallock
Griston East	233	Coshlea	Ballingarry	Kilmallock
Griston West	197	Coshlea	Ballingarry	Kilmallock
Grouselodge	363	Shanid	Kilcolman	Glin
Grove Island	3	Limerick, Muni. Borough of	St. Patrick's	Limerick
Hammondstown	69	Coshlea	Knocklong	Kilmallock
Harding Grove	354	Coshma	Bruree	Kilmallock
Hazelfield	150	Shanid	Robertstown	Rathkeale
**Herbertstown**	Town	Smallcounty	Ballinard	Kilmallock
**Herbertstown**	Town	Smallcounty	Kilcullane	Kilmallock
Herbertstown (O'Grady)	163	Smallcounty	Kilcullane	Kilmallock
Herbertstown (Powell)	163	Smallcounty	Kilcullane	Kilmallock
Hermitage	167	Clanwilliam	Stradbally	Limerick
Hernsbrook	167	Glenquin	Killeedy	Newcastle
Highmount	638	Connello Upper	Kilmeedy	Newcastle
Highmount	284	Connello Upper	Cloncrew	Newcastle
Highpark	519	Clanwilliam	Caherconlish	Limerick
Holly Island	2	Connello Lower	Tomdeely	Rathkeale
Honeypound	86	Pubblebrien	Croom	Croom
**Hospital**	Town	Smallcounty	Hospital	Kilmallock
Houndscourt	250	Coshlea	Kilflyn	Kilmallock
Howardstown North	64	Coshma	Bruree	Kilmallock
Howardstown South	327	Coshma	Bruree	Kilmallock
Hundredacres East	161	Clanwilliam	Caherconlish	Limerick
Hundredacres West	163	Clanwilliam	Caherconlish	Limerick
Huntingstown	27	Clanwilliam	Stradbally	Limerick
Inch St Lawrence	135	Clanwilliam	Ludden	Limerick
Inch St Lawrence North	344	Clanwilliam	Inch St. Lawrence	Limerick
Inch St Lawrence South	128	Clanwilliam	Inch St. Lawrence	Limerick
Incha	208	Connello Upper	Corcomohide	Croom
Inchacoomb	544	Coshlea	Galbally	Mitchelstown
Inchagreenoge	37	Shanid	Robertstown	Rathkeale
Inchinclare	257	Coshma	Croom	Croom
Inchinclare	240	Coshma	Athlacca	Croom
Inchmore	70	Clanwilliam	St. Nicholas	Limerick
Inishkeen	162	Glenquin	Mahoonagh	Newcastle
Irishtown	61	Limerick, Muni. Borough of	St. John's	Limerick
Island Dromagh	109	Coshlea	Knocklong	Kilmallock
Island MacTeige	47	Shanid	Robertstown	Rathkeale
Islandboy	104	Connello Lower	Rathkeale	Rathkeale
Islandduane	222	Pubblebrien	Mungret	Limerick
Islandea	207	Coshma	Adare	Croom
Issane	125	Kenry	Iveruss	Rathkeale
Jamestown	836	Coshlea	Kilquane	Kilmallock
Jockeyhall	265	Pubblebrien	Crecora	Croom
Keale	1,606	Shanid	Rathronan	Newcastle
Keale	652	Coshlea	Kilflyn	Kilmallock
Keeloges	961	Coshlea	Galbally	Mitchelstown
Keeloges	254	Coonagh	Oola	Tipperary
Kells	372	Connello Upper	Dromcolliher	Newcastle
Kerrikyle	397	Shanid	Rathronan	Newcastle
Keyanna	228	Clanwilliam	Derrygalvin	Limerick
Kilballyowen	1,079	Smallcounty	Knockainy	Kilmallock
Kilbane	210	Clanwilliam	Kilmurry	Limerick
Kilbeg East	41	Connello Upper	Ballingarry	Croom
Kilbeg West	164	Connello Upper	Ballingarry	Croom
Kilbehy	247	Connello Lower	Nantinan	Rathkeale
Kilbradran	413	Shanid	Kilbradran	Rathkeale
Kilbreedy	720	Kenry	Kilcornan	Rathkeale
Kilbreedy	428	Coshma	Bruree	Kilmallock
Kilbreedy	370	Coshma	Kilbreedy Minor	Kilmallock
Kilbreedy East	139	Coshlea	Kilbreedy Major	Kilmallock
Kilbreedy West	132	Coshlea	Kilbreedy Major	Kilmallock
Kilcolman	291	Connello Upper	Kilmeedy	Newcastle
Kilcolman	220	Pubblebrien	Kilkeedy	Limerick
Kilcolman	137	Shanid	Kilcolman	Glin
Kilcolman East	449	Connello Lower	Rathkeale	Rathkeale
Kilcolman West	248	Connello Lower	Rathkeale	Rathkeale
Kilcool	147	Connello Lower	Doondonnell	Rathkeale
Kilcoorha	360	Glenquin	Killeedy	Newcastle
Kilcosgrave	134	Shanid	Kilmoylan	Glin
Kilcosgrave	42	Shanid	Shanagolden	Glin
Kilcruaig	565	Coshlea	Kilflyn	Kilmallock
Kilcullane	724	Smallcounty	Kilcullane	Kilmallock
Kilculleen	527	Clanwilliam	Ludden	Limerick
Kilcurly	334	Kenry	Adare	Croom
Kilcurly	239	Pubblebrien	Monasteranenagh	Croom
Kilderry	508	Smallcounty	Ballycahane	Croom
Kilderry	121	Pubblebrien	Monasteranenagh	Croom
**Kildimo**	Town	Kenry	Kildimo	Rathkeale
Kildimo	340	Kenry	Kildimo	Rathkeale
Kildonnell	122	Pubblebrien	Ballycahane	Croom
Kildromin	750	Smallcounty	Kilteely	Kilmallock
Kilduff	252	Coonagh	Ballynaclogh	Tipperary
Kilduff	167	Coonagh	Grean	Tipperary
Kilduffahoo	862	Owneybeg	Doon	Limerick
Kilfergus	109	Shanid	Loghill	Glin
**Kilfinnane**	Town	Coshlea	Kilfinnane	Kilmallock
Kilfinnane	667	Coshlea	Kilfinnane	Kilmallock
Kilfinny	717	Connello Upper	Kilfinny	Croom
Kilfrush	797	Smallcounty	Kilfrush	Kilmallock
Kilgarriff	662	Coshlea	Ballingarry	Kilmallock
Kilglass	671	Coshlea	Kilbeheny	Mitchelstown
Kilgobbin	439	Coshma	Adare	Croom
Kilgolban	414	Glenquin	Clonelty	Newcastle
Kilgreana	81	Coshlea	Galbally	Mitchelstown
Kilgrogan	237	Kenry	Adare	Croom
Kilkaskin	261	Smallcounty	Fedamore	Croom
Kilkinlea Lower	807	Glenquin	Abbeyfeale	Newcastle
Kilkinlea Upper	818	Glenquin	Abbeyfeale	Newcastle
Kilknockan	199	Kenry	Adare	Croom
Killacolla	666	Shanid	Kilfergus	Glin
Killacolla	369	Connello Upper	Corcomohide	Kilmallock
Killacolla (Barker)	91	Shanid	Kilfergus	Glin
Killaculleen	1,296	Glenquin	Killeedy	Newcastle
Killaghteen	626	Glenquin	Ardagh	Newcastle
Killalee	40	Clanwilliam and Muni. Borough	St. John's	Limerick
Killanahan	196	Pubblebrien	Killeenoghty	Croom
Killard	202	Shanid	Ardagh	Newcastle
Killaready	316	Glenquin	Mahoonagh	Newcastle
Killea	159	Connello Lower	Croagh	Rathkeale
Killeagh	195	Clanwilliam	Ballybrood	Limerick
Killeany Beg	164	Shanid	Kilfergus	Glin
Killeany More	925	Shanid	Kilfergus	Glin
Killeedy North	625	Glenquin	Killeedy	Newcastle
Killeedy South	465	Glenquin	Killeedy	Newcastle
Killeen	513	Coshlea	Kilfinnane	Kilmallock
Killeen	506	Coshlea	Ballylanders	Mitchelstown
Killeen	298	Glenquin	Killeedy	Newcastle
Killeen	202	Coshma	Adare	Croom
Killeen	91	Kenry	Kilcornan	Rathkeale
Killeenagarriff	278	Clanwilliam	Killeenagarriff	Limerick
Killeenavera	129	Clanwilliam	Grean	Limerick
Killeenavera	86	Clanwilliam	Dromkeen	Limerick
Killeenoghty	200	Pubblebrien	Killeenoghty	Croom
Killeheen	347	Connello Lower	Kilscannell	Rathkeale
Killeline	170	Glenquin	Monagay	Newcastle
Killinane	187	Coshlea	Galbally	Mitchelstown
Killinure	343	Clanwilliam	Caherconlish	Limerick
Killonahan	320	Pubblebrien	Killonahan	Croom
Killonan	702	Clanwilliam	Kilmurry	Limerick
Killonan	218	Clanwilliam	Derrygalvin	Limerick
Killorath	289	Smallcounty	Glenogra	Croom
Killoughty	202	Connello Upper	Ballingarry	Croom
Killuragh	736	Owneybeg	Tuogh	Limerick
Kilmacanerla North	460	Connello Upper	Ballingarry	Croom
Kilmacanerla South	116	Connello Upper	Ballingarry	Croom
Kilmacat	218	Kenry	Ardcanny	Rathkeale
Kilmacogue	227	Coonagh	Doon	Tipperary
Kilmacow	1,078	Connello Upper	Ballingarry	Croom
**Kilmallock**	Town	Kilmallock	St. Peter's & St. Paul's	Kilmallock
Kilmallock	31	Kilmallock	St. Peter's & St. Paul's	Kilmallock
Kilmallock Hill	38	Kilmallock	St. Peter's & St. Paul's	Kilmallock
**Kilmeedy**	Town	Connello Upper	Kilmeedy	Newcastle
Kilmeedy	191	Connello Upper	Kilmeedy	Newcastle
Kilmihil	571	Coshlea	Ballingaddy	Kilmallock
Kilmihil	435	Connello Upper	Ballingarry	Croom
Kilmore	965	Connello Upper	Ballingarry	Croom
Kilmore Demesne	112	Connello Upper	Ballingarry	Croom
Kilmoreen	381	Kenry	Kildimo	Rathkeale
Kilmoylan	82	Shanid	Kilmoylan	Glin
Kilmoylan Lower	366	Coonagh	Doon	Tipperary
Kilmoylan Upper	246	Coonagh	Doon	Tipperary
Kilmurry	358	Coshlea	Emlygrennan	Kilmallock
Kilmurry (Archer)	351	Connello Upper	Kilmeedy	Newcastle
Kilmurry (Lane)	665	Connello Upper	Kilmeedy	Newcastle
Kilmurrybog	102	Connello Upper	Kilmeedy	Newcastle
Kilnamona	261	Connello Upper	Cloncagh	Newcastle
Kilpeacon	450	Smallcounty	Kilpeacon	Croom
Kilquane	96	Connello Lower	Clonagh	Rathkeale
Kilreash	127	Shanid	Ardagh	Newcastle
Kilrodane	161	Shanid	Newcastle	Newcastle
Kilrodane	141	Shanid	Ardagh	Newcastle
Kilrush	140	Pubblebrien and Muni. Borough	St. Munchin's	Limerick
Kilscanlan	349	Coshlea	Galbally	Mitchelstown
Kilscannell	617	Connello Lower	Kilscannell	Rathkeale
Kilshane	28	Connello Upper	Ballingarry	Croom
Kiltanna	370	Glenquin	Clonelty	Newcastle
**Kilteely**	Town	Coonagh	Kilteely	Kilmallock
Kilteely	199	Coonagh	Kilteely	Kilmallock
Kilteery	579	Shanid	Loghill	Glin
Kiltemplan	162	Pubblebrien	Kilkeedy	Limerick
Kiltenan North	219	Connello Lower	Croagh	Rathkeale
Kiltenan South	248	Connello Lower	Croagh	Rathkeale
Kimeheer	88	Shanid	Robertstown	Glin
Kinard	431	Shanid	Kilfergus	Glin
King's Island	132	Limerick, Muni. Borough of	St. Munchin's	Limerick
Kingsland	216	Connello Upper	Ballingarry	Croom
Kishyquirk	288	Clanwilliam	Abington	Limerick
Knightstreet	104	Connello Upper	Ballingarry	Croom
Knock	80	Pubblebrien	St. Munchin's	Limerick
Knockaclugga	296	Shanid	Kilmoylan	Glin
Knockacraig	453	Connello Upper	Dromcolliher	Newcastle
Knockadea	380	Coshlea	Ballylanders	Mitchelstown
**Knockaderry**	Town	Glenquin	Clonelty	Newcastle
Knockaderry	706	Glenquin	Clonelty	Newcastle
**Knockainy**	Town	Smallcounty	Knockainy	Kilmallock
Knockainy East	71	Smallcounty	Knockainy	Kilmallock
Knockainy West	1,160	Smallcounty	Knockainy	Kilmallock
Knockananty	240	Clanwilliam	Derrygalvin	Limerick
Knockanbaun	295	Clanwilliam	Killeenagarriff	Limerick
Knockane	166	Glenquin	Monagay	Newcastle
Knockanea	343	Clanwilliam	Caherconlish	Limerick
Knockanebrack	477	Coshlea	Galbally	Mitchelstown
Knockanerry	299	Owneybeg	Abington	Limerick
Knockanes	472	Coshma	Adare	Croom
Knockannacreeva	170	Coshma	Bruree	Kilmallock
Knockardnacorlan	240	Shanid	Robertstown	Rathkeale
Knockatancashlane	267	Clanwilliam	Caherconlish	Limerick
Knockaunavad	156	Connello Lower	Rathkeale	Rathkeale
Knockaunavlyman	56	Coshlea	Ballingarry	Kilmallock
Knockaunavoddig	226	Connello Upper	Bruree	Kilmallock
Knockaundoolis	162	Coonagh	Templebredon	Tipperary
Knockaunnacurraha	235	Coshlea	Galbally	Mitchelstown
Knockaunnagun	161	Shanid	Rathronan	Newcastle
Knockaunroe	110	Coonagh	Grean	Tipperary
Knockballyfookeen	433	Coonagh	Oola	Tipperary
Knockbrack	992	Glenquin	Abbeyfeale	Newcastle
Knockbrack East	173	Clanwilliam	Killeenagarriff	Limerick
Knockbrack East	16	Clanwilliam	Stradbally	Limerick
Knockbrack West	31	Clanwilliam	Killeenagarriff	Limerick
Knockbrack West	23	Clanwilliam	Stradbally	Limerick
Knockbrien	74	Clanwilliam	Cahernarry	Limerick
Knockbweeheen	301	Shanid	Kilcolman	Glin
Knockcommane	293	Coshlea	Kilbeheny	Mitchelstown
Knockcoolkeare	675	Glenquin	Killeedy	Kanturk
Knockcorragh	131	Clanwilliam	Caherelly	Limerick
Knockderk	412	Coonagh	Grean	Tipperary
Knockdown	1,076	Shanid	Kilmoylan	Glin
Knockdromin	148	Connello Lower	Clonshire	Rathkeale
Knockdromin	101	Connello Lower	Cappagh	Rathkeale
Knockea	62	Clanwilliam	Cahernarry	Limerick
Knockeen	107	Clanwilliam	Caherconlish	Limerick
Knockeravella	11	Coonagh	Templebredon	Tipperary
Knockfennell	238	Smallcounty	Monasteranenagh	Croom
Knockfenora	336	Connello Upper	Bruree	Kilmallock
Knockfinnisk	1,017	Shanid	Dunmoylan	Newcastle
Knockglass	658	Glenquin	Killagholehane	Newcastle
Knockgrean	88	Coonagh	Grean	Tipperary
Knocklary	317	Coshlea	Ballingarry	Kilmallock
Knocklong	117	Smallcounty	Kilfrush	Kilmallock
Knocklong East	559	Coshlea	Knocklong	Kilmallock
Knocklong West	702	Coshlea	Knocklong	Kilmallock
Knockmore	225	Connello Upper	Bruree	Kilmallock
Knocknaboha	141	Shanid	Ardagh	Newcastle
Knocknabooly East	573	Shanid	Loghill	Glin
Knocknabooly Middle	225	Shanid	Loghill	Glin
Knocknabooly West	517	Shanid	Loghill	Glin
Knocknacarriga	252	Coonagh	Doon	Tipperary
Knocknacrohy	196	Coonagh	Grean	Tipperary
Knocknadiha	1,095	Glenquin	Killeedy	Newcastle
Knocknagalty	1,754	Coshlea	Kilbeheny	Mitchelstown
Knocknagornagh	1,699	Shanid	Kilmoylan	Glin
Knocknagorteeny	439	Owneybeg	Abington	Limerick
Knocknagranshy	290	Pubblebrien	Monasteranenagh	Croom
Knocknascrow	1,571	Coshlea	Kilbeheny	Mitchelstown
Knocknasnaa	1,825	Glenquin	Abbeyfeale	Newcastle
Knockpatrick	242	Shanid	Robertstown	Glin
Knockroe	555	Coonagh	Kilteely	Tipperary
Knockroe	174	Kenry	Kildimo	Rathkeale
Knockroe	47	Clanwilliam	Caherconlish	Limerick
Knockroe (Mason)	446	Clanwilliam	Inch St. Lawrence	Limerick
Knockroe (Wilson)	269	Clanwilliam	Inch St. Lawrence	Limerick
Knockrour	249	Coshlea	Kilbeheny	Mitchelstown
Knocksentry	221	Clanwilliam	Killeenagarriff	Limerick
Knocksouna	446	Coshma	Tankardstown	Kilmallock
Knocktoosh	1,100	Glenquin	Killagholehane	Newcastle
Knocktoran	405	Coshlea	Knocklong	Kilmallock
Knockuregare	357	Coshma	Uregare	Kilmallock
Kyle	66	Smallcounty	Knockainy	Kilmallock
Kyleavarraga Middle	52	Kenry	Adare	Rathkeale
Kyleavarraga North	44	Kenry	Adare	Rathkeale
Kyleavarraga South	150	Kenry	Adare	Rathkeale
Kylegarve	320	Coonagh	Doon	Tipperary
Kylenagoneeny	273	Coonagh	Oola	Tipperary
Kyletaun	468	Connello Lower	Rathkeale	Rathkeale
Lack West	305	Coshlea	Galbally	Mitchelstown
Lacka	248	Clanwilliam	Stradbally	Limerick
Lacka	162	Pubblebrien	Monasteranenagh	Croom
Lacka Beg	254	Coonagh	Doon	Tipperary
Lacka Lower	165	Glenquin	Killagholehane	Newcastle
Lacka More	310	Coonagh	Doon	Tipperary
Lacka Upper	193	Glenquin	Killagholehane	Newcastle
Lackanagoneeny	286	Coonagh	Doon	Tipperary
Lackanagrour	117	Coshma	Bruree	Kilmallock
Lackanascarry	89	Coonagh	Ballynaclogh	Tipperary
Lackelly East	153	Coshlea	Galbally	Mitchelstown
Lackendarragh	1,165	Coshlea	Kilbeheny	Mitchelstown
Laghtane East	250	Clanwilliam	Killeenagarriff	Limerick
Laghtane West	3	Clanwilliam	Killeenagarriff	Limerick
Laskiltagh	43	Coshma	Croom	Croom
Laurencetown North	340	Coshlea	Particles	Kilmallock
Laurencetown South	423	Coshlea	Particles	Kilmallock
Leagane	152	Coshma	Effin	Kilmallock
Leahys	470	Shanid	Robertstown	Glin
Lemonfield	434	Pubblebrien	Knocknagaul	Limerick
Lickadoon	671	Clanwilliam	Caheravally	Limerick
Liffane	392	Connello Lower	Lismakeery	Rathkeale
**Limerick City**	Town	Limerick City	St. John's	Limerick
**Limerick City**	Town	Limerick City	St. Lawrence's	Limerick
**Limerick City**	Town	Limerick City	St. Mary's	Limerick
**Limerick City**	Town	Limerick City	St. Michael's	Limerick
**Limerick City**	Town	Limerick City	St. Munchin's	Limerick
**Limerick City**	Town	Limerick City	St. Nicholas'	Limerick
**Limerick City**	Town	Limerick City	St. Patrick's	Limerick
Linfield	334	Coonagh	Grean	Tipperary
Lisbane	370	Shanid	Dunmoylan	Rathkeale
Liscreagh	146	Owneybeg	Abington	Limerick
Lisduane	677	Connello Upper	Ballingarry	Croom
Lisduff	106	Connello Upper	Ballingarry	Croom
Lisgaugh	139	Coonagh	Doon	Tipperary
Lisgordan	216	Shanid	Rathronan	Glin
Lisheen	84	Coonagh	Ballynaclogh	Tipperary
Lisheensheela	250	Connello Upper	Kilmeedy	Newcastle
Lisillaun	1	Connello Lower	Morgans	Rathkeale
Liskennett East	235	Connello Upper	Ballingarry	Croom
Liskennett West	301	Connello Upper	Ballingarry	Croom
Liskilleen (Dickson)	72	Shanid	Ardagh	Newcastle
Liskilleen (O'Brien)	151	Shanid	Ardagh	Rathkeale
Liskilly	179	Coshma	Adare	Croom
Lismakeery	522	Connello Lower	Lismakeery	Rathkeale
Lismullane	267	Clanwilliam	Abington	Limerick
Lisnacullia	131	Connello Lower	Clonagh	Rathkeale
Lisnacullia	88	Coonagh	Oola	Tipperary
Lisnacullia	48	Coonagh	Doon	Tipperary
Lisnafulla	240	Glenquin	Killeedy	Newcastle
Lisnagry	429	Clanwilliam	Stradbally	Limerick
Lisnalanniv	365	Coshlea	Kilbeheny	Mitchelstown
Lisnamuck	363	Connello Lower	Croagh	Rathkeale
Lisready (Clare)	322	Shanid	Loghill	Glin
Lisready (Cripps)	475	Shanid	Loghill	Glin
Lissaleen	199	Pubblebrien	Croom	Limerick
Lissamota	607	Connello Upper	Ballingarry	Croom
Lissanalta	238	Pubblebrien	Knocknagaul	Limerick
Lissanarroor	161	Coshlea	Galbally	Mitchelstown
Lissaniska East	328	Glenquin	Clonelty	Newcastle
Lissaniska West	292	Glenquin	Clonelty	Newcastle
Lissard	684	Coshlea	Galbally	Mitchelstown
Lissatotan	286	Shanid	Kilbradran	Rathkeale
Lissatotan	33	Connello Lower	Clonagh	Rathkeale
Lissavarra	152	Connello Upper	Ballingarry	Croom
Lissowen	189	Coonagh	Doon	Tipperary
Lissurland	174	Glenquin	Monagay	Newcastle
Lodge	543	Smallcounty	Hospital	Kilmallock
Logavinshire	135	Pubblebrien	Crecora	Croom
**Loghill**	Town	Shanid	Loghill	Glin
Loghill	645	Shanid	Loghill	Glin
Loghill	508	Connello Lower	Rathkeale	Rathkeale
Lombardstown	199	Clanwilliam	Caherconlish	Limerick
Longford	4	Coonagh	Doon	Tipperary
Longford East	100	Coonagh	Oola	Tipperary
Longford West	95	Coonagh	Oola	Tipperary
Longstone	91	Clanwilliam	Grean	Limerick
Lotteragh Lower	106	Connello Upper	Bruree	Kilmallock
Lotteragh Upper	311	Connello Upper	Bruree	Kilmallock
Loughananna	457	Coshlea	Kilbeheny	Mitchelstown
Loughanleagh	78	Pubblebrien	Mungret	Limerick
Loughanstown	108	Clanwilliam	Caheravally	Limerick
Loughanstown	11	Clanwilliam	Fedamore	Limerick
Loughaun	95	Connello Lower	Nantinan	Rathkeale
Loughgur	1,285	Smallcounty	Knockainy	Kilmallock
Loughmore Commons	38	Pubblebrien	Mungret	Limerick
Ludden Beg	243	Clanwilliam	Ludden	Limerick
Ludden More	437	Clanwilliam	Ludden	Limerick
Lurraga	155	Pubblebrien	Croom	Limerick
Lurraga	97	Connello Lower	Nantinan	Rathkeale
Lurraga	25	Pubblebrien	Mungret	Limerick
Lyre	69	Coshlea	Galbally	Mitchelstown
Maddyboy	609	Clanwilliam	Clonkeen	Limerick
Maddyboy	84	Clanwilliam	Abington	Limerick
Maelra	130	Coonagh	Oola	Tipperary
Maghera	85	Pubblebrien	Croom	Croom
Magherareagh	36	Smallcounty	Athneasy	Kilmallock
Magherareagh	21	Smallcounty	Kilbreedy Major	Kilmallock
**Mahoonagh**	Town	Glenquin	Mahoonagh	Newcastle
Mahoonagh Beg	91	Glenquin	Mahoonagh	Newcastle
Mahoonagh More	311	Glenquin	Mahoonagh	Newcastle
Maidstown	380	Coshma	Dromin	Kilmallock
Marlbrook	37	Pubblebrien	Crecora	Croom
Martinstown	527	Coshlea	Athneasy	Kilmallock
Maryville	143	Pubblebrien	Ballycahane	Croom
Mauricetown	893	Glenquin	Killeedy	Newcastle
Mayne	107	Glenquin	Mahoonagh	Newcastle
Meadagh	142	Coshma	Uregare	Kilmallock
Meanus	298	Smallcounty	Glenogra	Croom
Meentolla	494	Owneybeg	Abington	Limerick
Meenyline North	957	Glenquin	Monagay	Newcastle
Meenyline South	531	Glenquin	Monagay	Newcastle
Mellon	580	Kenry	Ardcanny	Rathkeale
Millfarm	212	Smallcounty	Hospital	Kilmallock
Millmount	241	Coshlea	Ballingaddy	Kilmallock
Milltown	360	Kenry	Iveruss	Rathkeale
Milltown	239	Connello Lower	Croagh	Rathkeale
Milltown	149	Coonagh	Aglishcormick	Tipperary
Milltown	141	Clanwilliam	Derrygalvin	Limerick
Milltown	118	Coshma	Uregare	Kilmallock
Milltown	117	Smallcounty	Knockainy	Kilmallock
Milltown	57	Coshlea	Ballingaddy	Kilmallock
Milltown	51	Coonagh	Doon	Tipperary
Milltown	30	Clanwilliam	Kilmurry	Limerick
Milltown North	192	Connello Lower	Lismakeery	Rathkeale
Milltown South	140	Connello Lower	Lismakeery	Rathkeale
Minister's-land	175	Shanid	Ardagh	Newcastle
Mitchelstown	127	Kenry	Iveruss	Rathkeale
Mitchelstowndown	133	Coshlea	Ballingarry	Kilmallock
Mitchelstowndown East	144	Coshlea	Knocklong	Kilmallock
Mitchelstowndown North	277	Coshlea	Knocklong	Kilmallock
Mitchelstowndown West	277	Coshlea	Knocklong	Kilmallock
Moanaaviddoge	96	Coonagh	Oola	Tipperary
Moanahila	177	Coonagh	Oola	Tipperary
Moanduff	135	Coonagh	Castletown	Tipperary
Moanleana	451	Glenquin	Mahoonagh	Newcastle
Moanmore	212	Coshlea	Particles	Kilmallock
Moanmore	100	Smallcounty	Fedamore	Croom
Moanoola	133	Coonagh	Oola	Tipperary
Moanour	632	Coonagh	Oola	Tipperary
Moanroe	309	Coonagh	Oola	Tipperary
Moanroe	56	Clanwilliam	Dromkeen	Limerick
Moanroe Beg	182	Glenquin	Killeedy	Newcastle
Moanroe More	379	Glenquin	Killeedy	Newcastle
Moanwing	98	Connello Lower	Rathkeale	Rathkeale
Moher	481	Owneybeg	Abington	Limerick
Mohernagh	822	Shanid	Kilmoylan	Glin
Moig	305	Shanid	Kilmoylan	Glin
Moig East	116	Kenry	Kilcornan	Rathkeale
Moig East Glebe	77	Kenry	Kilcornan	Rathkeale
Moig North	244	Connello Lower	Askeaton	Rathkeale
Moig South	811	Connello Lower	Askeaton	Rathkeale
Moig West	218	Kenry	Kilcornan	Rathkeale
Moigh	209	Clanwilliam	Caherconlish	Limerick
Monabraher	142	Pubblebrien and Muni. Borough	Killeely	Limerick
Monaclinoe	94	Clanwilliam	St. Lawrence's	Limerick
Monamuck	31	Clanwilliam and Muni. Borough	St. John's	Limerick
Monanooag	104	Kenry	Kildimo	Rathkeale
Monashinnagh	51	Shanid	Ardagh	Newcastle
Monaster North	262	Pubblebrien	Monasteranenagh	Croom
Monaster South	381	Coshma	Monasteranenagh	Croom
Monavaha	96	Shanid	Robertstown	Glin
Monavaha	77	Shanid	Shanagolden	Glin
Mondellihy	342	Coshma	Adare	Croom
Monearla	172	Coshma	Adare	Croom
Moneen	119	Coshlea	Particles	Kilmallock
Moneteen	71	Pubblebrien	Mungret	Limerick
Moneymohill	624	Shanid	Dunmoylan	Glin
Mongfune	590	Owneybeg	Abington	Limerick
**Montpelier**	Town	Clanwilliam	Stradbally	Limerick
Montpelier	263	Clanwilliam	Stradbally	Limerick
Moohane	170	Smallcounty	Cahercorney	Kilmallock
Moorestown	817	Coshlea	Kilfinnane	Kilmallock
Morenane	859	Connello Upper	Ballingarry	Croom
Morgans North	807	Connello Lower	Morgans	Rathkeale
Morgans South	405	Connello Lower	Morgans	Rathkeale
Mornane	751	Kenry	Kilcornan	Rathkeale
**Moroe**	Town	Owneybeg	Abington	Limerick
Moroe	135	Owneybeg	Abington	Limerick
Moroewood	241	Owneybeg	Abington	Limerick
Mortgage	358	Smallcounty	Fedamore	Croom
Mortlestown	819	Coshlea	Particles	Kilmallock
Mountblakeney	562	Coshma	Kilbreedy Minor	Kilmallock
Mountcatherine	26	Coonagh	Ballynaclogh	Tipperary
Mountcatherine	17	Coonagh	Grean	Tipperary
Mountcollins	1,025	Glenquin	Killeedy	Newcastle
Mountcoote	310	Coshlea	Ardpatrick	Kilmallock
Mountdavid	327	Shanid	Shanagolden	Glin
Mounteagle	167	Connello Upper	Bruree	Kilmallock
Mountfox	291	Kilmallock	St. Peter's & St. Paul's	Kilmallock
Mountkennet	21	Limerick, Muni. Borough of	St. Michael's	Limerick
Mountminnett	286	Clanwilliam	Ballybrood	Limerick
Mountpleasant	172	Kenry	Ardcanny	Rathkeale
Mountplummer	1,171	Glenquin	Monagay	Newcastle
Mountrussell	1,134	Coshlea	Ballingaddy	Kilmallock
Mountshannon	318	Clanwilliam	Stradbally	Limerick
Mountshannon	2	Clanwilliam	Killeenagarriff	Limerick
Mountsion	176	Clanwilliam	Grean	Limerick
Mountsion	7	Clanwilliam	Dromkeen	Limerick
Mounttrenchard	525	Shanid	Loghill	Glin
Mountwilliam	59	Coshma	Adare	Croom
Moveedy	121	Glenquin	Grange	Newcastle
Moylish	73	Pubblebrien	St. Munchin's	Limerick
Moymore	133	Coonagh	Grean	Tipperary
Moyreen	509	Shanid	Dunmoylan	Glin
Muingacree	805	Owneybeg	Doon	Limerick
Mulderricksfield	178	Shanid	Kilmoylan	Rathkeale
Mulderricksfield	118	Shanid	Robertstown	Rathkeale
Mullagh	312	Shanid	Kilmoylan	Rathkeale
Mullans	82	Smallcounty	Knockainy	Kilmallock
Mundellihy	890	Connello Upper	Dromcolliher	Newcastle
Nantinan	71	Connello Lower	Nantinan	Rathkeale
**Newcastle**	Town	Glenquin	Monagay	Newcastle
**Newcastle**	Town	Glenquin	Newcastle	Newcastle
Newcastle	697	Clanwilliam	Kilmurry	Limerick
Newgarden North	203	Clanwilliam	Stradbally	Limerick
Newgarden South	6	Clanwilliam	Stradbally	Limerick
Newpark	139	Coshlea	Effin	Kilmallock
Newpark	111	Connello Lower	Croagh	Rathkeale
Newtown	1,664	Pubblebrien	Kilkeedy	Limerick
Newtown	457	Clanwilliam	Kilmurry	Limerick
Newtown	410	Coonagh	Tuoghcluggin	Tipperary
Newtown	365	Kenry	Kilcornan	Rathkeale
Newtown	289	Smallcounty	Hospital	Kilmallock
Newtown	289	Coshlea	Galbally	Mitchelstown
Newtown	243	Smallcounty	Kilpeacon	Croom
Newtown	143	Coshma	Bruff	Kilmallock
Newtown	56	Clanwilliam	Inch St. Lawrence	Limerick
Newtown	22	Clanwilliam	Caherconlish	Limerick
Newtown North	276	Coonagh	Oola	Tipperary
Newtown South	18	Coonagh	Oola	Tipperary
**Nicker**	Town	Coonagh	Grean	Tipperary
Nicker	194	Coonagh	Grean	Tipperary
Oatlands	115	Clanwilliam	Caheravally	Limerick
Oldabbey	547	Shanid	Robertstown	Glin
Oldcourt	147	Connello Lower	Croagh	Rathkeale
Oldtown (Bennett)	541	Smallcounty	Hospital	Kilmallock
Oldtown (Ryan)	212	Smallcounty	Hospital	Kilmallock
**Oola**	Town	Coonagh	Oola	Tipperary
Oolahills East	530	Coonagh	Oola	Tipperary
Oolahills West	73	Coonagh	Oola	Tipperary
Oorla	97	Shanid	Robertstown	Rathkeale
Pallas	366	Kenry	Chapelrussell	Rathkeale
Pallas	270	Connello Upper	Kilmeedy	Newcastle
Pallas	171	Coonagh	Grean	Tipperary
Pallas	66	Kenry	Kilcornan	Rathkeale
**Pallas Grean**	Town	Coonagh	Grean	Tipperary
Pallasbeg	492	Owneybeg	Tuogh	Limerick
Pallashill	128	Coonagh	Grean	Tipperary
**Pallaskenry**	Town	Kenry	Chapelrussell	Rathkeale
Park	634	Shanid	Dunmoylan	Glin
Park	454	Coshlea	Galbally	Mitchelstown
Park	240	Clanwilliam and Muni. Borough	St. Patrick's	Limerick
Park	72	Clanwilliam	Stradbally	Limerick
Parkaree	51	Pubblebrien	Monasteranenagh	Croom
Parkatotaun	74	Clanwilliam	Fedamore	Limerick
Parkatotaun	49	Clanwilliam	Caheravally	Limerick
Parklewis	47	Connello Lower	Rathkeale	Rathkeale
Parkmore	66	Shanid	Robertstown	Glin
Parkmore	59	Shanid	Shanagolden	Glin
Parkroe	215	Clanwilliam	Caheravally	Limerick
Parkroe	33	Coshma	Dromin	Kilmallock
Parkwood	20	Clanwilliam	Stradbally	Limerick
Patrickswell	473	Smallcounty	Knockainy	Kilmallock
Peafield	41	Clanwilliam	Kilmurry	Limerick
Pigott's Island	3	Kenry	Kilcornan	Rathkeale
Plaukarauka	133	Coonagh	Grean	Tipperary
Port	1,205	Glenquin	Abbeyfeale	Newcastle
Port	64	Kenry	Adare	Croom
Portane	112	Coonagh	Oola	Tipperary
Portane	24	Coonagh	Doon	Tipperary
Portauns	357	Kilmallock	St. Peter's & St. Paul's	Kilmallock
Portboy	136	Smallcounty	Ballynamona	Kilmallock
Portcrusha	286	Clanwilliam	Stradbally	Limerick
Portnard	2,123	Owneybeg	Tuogh	Limerick
Poultaloon	188	Smallcounty	Fedamore	Croom
Powerfield	22	Smallcounty	Monasteranenagh	Croom
Prior's-land	226	Limerick, Muni. Borough of	St. Michael's	Limerick
Prior's-land	61	Limerick, Muni. Borough of	Killeely	Limerick
Proonts	27	Kilmallock	St. Peter's & St. Paul's	Kilmallock
Prospect	289	Clanwilliam	Stradbally	Limerick
Prospect	99	Coonagh	Oola	Tipperary
Puckane	224	Owneybeg	Abington	Limerick
Pullagh	283	Coonagh	Doon	Tipperary
Pullagh	218	Coshma	Croom	Croom
Pust North	180	Clanwilliam	Caherconlish	Limerick
Pust North	46	Clanwilliam	Inch St. Lawrence	Limerick
Pust South	49	Clanwilliam	Inch St. Lawrence	Limerick
Pust South	21	Clanwilliam	Caherconlish	Limerick
Race	48	Coonagh	Grean	Tipperary
Racebeg	19	Coonagh	Ballynaclogh	Tipperary
Ragamus	164	Smallcounty	Knockainy	Kilmallock
Rahanagh	166	Glenquin	Killeedy	Newcastle
Rahard	81	Coonagh	Tuoghcluggin	Tipperary
Raheen	394	Clanwilliam	Caheravally	Limerick
Raheen	357	Connello Lower	Croagh	Rathkeale
Raheen	324	Coshma	Tullabracky	Croom
Raheen	268	Coshlea	Ballyscaddan	Kilmallock
Raheen	115	Clanwilliam	Killeenagarriff	Limerick
Raheenagh	895	Glenquin	Killeedy	Newcastle
Raheennamadra	397	Coshlea	Knocklong	Kilmallock
Raheenroe	84	Coshlea	Particles	Kilmallock
Raheenroe	40	Coshlea	Kilflyn	Kilmallock
Rahina	58	Pubblebrien	Kilkeedy	Limerick
Ranahan	322	Connello Lower	Rathkeale	Rathkeale
Rath	377	Owneybeg	Abington	Limerick
Rathanny	713	Smallcounty	Knockainy	Kilmallock
Rathbane North	359	Clanwilliam and Muni. Borough	St. Nicholas	Limerick
Rathbane South	159	Clanwilliam	St. Nicholas	Limerick
Rathbranagha	443	Coshma	Croom	Croom
Rathcahill East	746	Glenquin	Monagay	Newcastle
Rathcahill West	1,041	Glenquin	Monagay	Newcastle
Rathcannon	2,130	Coshma	Athlacca	Kilmallock
Rathfarra	75	Shanid	Shanagolden	Glin
Rathfreedy	268	Glenquin	Clonelty	Newcastle
Rathgoonan	66	Connello Lower	Clonagh	Rathkeale
Rathjordan	813	Clanwilliam	Rathjordan	Limerick
**Rathkeale**	Town	Connello Lower	Rathkeale	Rathkeale
Rathkeale	302	Connello Lower	Rathkeale	Rathkeale
Rathkeale Commons	46	Connello Lower	Rathkeale	Rathkeale
Rathmale	183	Pubblebrien	Mungret	Limerick
Rathmore North	718	Smallcounty	Monasteranenagh	Croom
Rathmore South	594	Smallcounty	Monasteranenagh	Croom
Rathnagore	78	Shanid	Kilbradran	Rathkeale
Rathnaneane	116	Glenquin	Monagay	Newcastle
Rathnaseer	483	Connello Lower	Nantinan	Rathkeale
Rathpalantine	347	Glenquin	Mahoonagh	Newcastle
Rathreagh Beg	171	Connello Lower	Clonagh	Rathkeale
Rathreagh More	300	Connello Lower	Clonagh	Rathkeale
Rathurd	189	Clanwilliam	St. Nicholas	Limerick
Rathurd	139	Clanwilliam	Donaghmore	Limerick
Rathwood	280	Owneybeg	Abington	Limerick
Rawleystown	261	Smallcounty	Cahercorney	Kilmallock
Raymondstown	186	Coshma	Dromin	Kilmallock
Reanagillee Commons	320	Glenquin	Killeedy	Newcastle
Reask	386	Coonagh	Tuoghcluggin	Tipperary
Reboge	226	Clanwilliam and Muni. Borough	St. Patrick's	Limerick
Reboge Island	78	Limerick, Muni. Borough of	St. Patrick's	Limerick
Reboge Meadows	29	Clanwilliam	St. Patrick's	Limerick
Reenavanna East	378	Coonagh	Doon	Tipperary
Reenavanna West	279	Coonagh	Doon	Tipperary
Reens East	167	Connello Lower	Kilscannell	Rathkeale
Reens West	169	Connello Lower	Kilscannell	Rathkeale
Reerasta North	72	Shanid	Ardagh	Newcastle
Reerasta South	83	Shanid	Ardagh	Newcastle
Richhill	64	Clanwilliam	Stradbally	Limerick
Richmondvilla	135	Pubblebrien	Crecora	Croom
Riddlestown	819	Connello Lower	Doondonnell	Rathkeale
Rincullia	151	Shanid	Robertstown	Rathkeale
Rineroe	431	Coshma	Adare	Croom
Ringmoylan	113	Kenry	Kilcorcoran	Rathkeale
Ringmoylan	99	Kenry	Ardcanny	Rathkeale
Rintulla	128	Kenry	Kilcornan	Rathkeale
Rivers	317	Clanwilliam	Kilmurry	Limerick
Rivers	118	Clanwilliam	Stradbally	Limerick
Rivers	21	Clanwilliam	Killeenagarriff	Limerick
Riversfield	159	Coshlea	Ardpatrick	Kilmallock
Robertstown	285	Shanid	Robertstown	Rathkeale
Rochestown	465	Clanwilliam	Rochestown	Limerick
Rockbarton	245	Coshma	Tullabracky	Croom
Rockbarton	241	Smallcounty	Glenogra	Croom
Rockfarm	60	Clanwilliam	Ballybrood	Limerick
Rockfield	129	Smallcounty	Ballycahane	Croom
**Rockhill**	Town	Connello Upper	Bruree	Kilmallock
Rockstown	233	Clanwilliam	Fedamore	Limerick
Rockstown	52	Clanwilliam	Rochestown	Limerick
Rooskagh East	1,022	Shanid	Ardagh	Newcastle
Rooskagh West	921	Shanid	Ardagh	Newcastle
Rootiagh	274	Smallcounty	Ballinard	Kilmallock
Rootiagh	179	Pubblebrien	Crecora	Limerick
Rossard	22	Clanwilliam	Ludden	Limerick
Rossbane	140	Connello Upper	Corcomohide	Croom
Rossbrien	323	Pubblebrien	St. Michael's	Limerick
Rossmore	231	Connello Upper	Corcomohide	Croom
Rosstemple	354	Coshma	Athlacca	Kilmallock
Rosstemple	65	Coshma	Croom	Croom
Routagh	345	Clanwilliam	Donaghmore	Limerick
Rower Beg	250	Coshma	Adare	Croom
Rower More	182	Coshma	Adare	Croom
Roxborough	526	Clanwilliam	Caheravally	Limerick
Ruan	67	Clanwilliam	Stradbally	Limerick
Ruppulagh	1,094	Coshlea	Darragh	Kilmallock
Rylanes	207	Connello Lower	Rathkeale	Croom
Rylanes	88	Connello Upper	Ballingarry	Croom
Ryves Castle	390	Coshlea	Ballyscaddan	Kilmallock
Sallymount	68	Clanwilliam	Stradbally	Limerick
Sandylane	267	Clanwilliam	Abington	Limerick
Sandylane	174	Clanwilliam	Caherconlish	Limerick
Scart	234	Clanwilliam	Derrygalvin	Limerick
Scart	195	Coonagh	Kilteely	Tipperary
Scart	183	Clanwilliam	Cahernarry	Limerick
Scart	141	Connello Lower	Nantinan	Rathkeale
Scarteen	242	Coshlea	Ballyscaddan	Kilmallock
Scoul	37	Coshma	Uregare	Kilmallock
Scoul	35	Coshma	Dromin	Kilmallock
Scrowmore	377	Coshlea	Kilbeheny	Mitchelstown
Seeconglas	770	Glenquin	Killeedy	Newcastle
Shanaclogh	193	Pubblebrien	Crecora	Croom
Shanaclogh	147	Connello Upper	Croom	Croom
Shanaclogh East	78	Coonagh	Oola	Tipperary
Shanaclogh West	106	Coonagh	Oola	Tipperary
Shanacloon	355	Coonagh	Doon	Tipperary
**Shanagolden**	Town	Shanid	Shanagolden	Glin
Shanagolden	57	Shanid	Shanagolden	Glin
Shanagolden Demesne	259	Shanid	Shanagolden	Glin
Shanagolden Demesne	13	Shanid	Robertstown	Glin
Shanbally	265	Kenry	Kilcornan	Rathkeale
Shandangan	14	Coonagh	Tuoghcluggin	Tipperary
Shangarry	201	Glenquin	Monagay	Newcastle
Shanid Lower	552	Shanid	Kilmoylan	Glin
Shanid Upper	159	Shanid	Kilmoylan	Glin
Shannabooly	146	Pubblebrien	St. Munchin's	Limerick
Shannon Grove	476	Kenry	Ardcanny	Rathkeale
Shannonview	31	Connello Lower	Askeaton	Rathkeale
Shanpallas	221	Kenry	Chapelrussell	Rathkeale
Shanrath	343	Glenquin	Mahoonagh	Newcastle
Shantraud	40	Kenry	Adare	Croom
Sheshiv	181	Connello Upper	Cloncrew	Newcastle
Singland	523	Clanwilliam and Muni. Borough	St. Patrick's	Limerick
**Sixmilebridge**	Town	Smallcounty	Monasteranenagh	Croom
Skagh	383	Coshma	Croom	Croom
Skahard	140	Clanwilliam	Caherconlish	Limerick
Skehacreggaun	99	Pubblebrien	Mungret	Limerick
Skehanagh	406	Connello Lower	Kilscannell	Rathkeale
Skehanagh	136	Pubblebrien	Ballycahane	Croom
Skehanagh	110	Pubblebrien	Kilpeacon	Croom
Skool	292	Smallcounty	Fedamore	Limerick
Skoolhill	214	Smallcounty	Fedamore	Limerick
Sluggary	347	Pubblebrien	Mungret	Limerick
Snugborough	169	Coshlea	Galbally	Mitchelstown
Spital-land	185	Clanwilliam and Muni. Borough	St. Laurence's	Limerick
Spittle	607	Coshlea	Ballylanders	Mitchelstown
Spittle	368	Coshlea	Darragh	Kilmallock
Springfield	414	Glenquin	Killagholehane	Newcastle
Springlodge	79	Pubblebrien	Monasteranenagh	Croom
Srahane	231	Clanwilliam	Carrigparson	Limerick
Srahane East	218	Clanwilliam	Caherconlish	Limerick
Srahane West	63	Clanwilliam	Caherconlish	Limerick
Sreelane	111	Clanwilliam	Kilmurry	Limerick
Sroolane	216	Shanid	Shanagolden	Rathkeale
Sroolane North	81	Shanid	Robertstown	Rathkeale
Sroolane South	20	Shanid	Robertstown	Rathkeale
St Francisabbey	10	Limerick, Muni. Borough of	St. Mary's	Limerick
**St. Patrickswell**	Town	Pubblebrien	Killonahan	Croom
**St. Patrickswell**	Town	Pubblebrien	Kilkeedy	Limerick
**St. Patrickswell**	Town	Pubblebrien	Mungret	Limerick
Steales	143	Kilmallock	St. Peter's & St. Paul's	Kilmallock
Stephenstown	170	Coshlea	Athneasy	Kilmallock
Stokesfield	182	Shanid	Robertstown	Rathkeale
**Stonehall**	Town	Kenry	Kilcornan	Rathkeale
Stonehall	201	Kenry	Kilcornan	Rathkeale
Stonepark	132	Clanwilliam	Ludden	Limerick
Stonetown	30	Limerick, Muni. Borough of	St. Nicholas	Limerick
Stoneville	191	Connello Lower	Nantinan	Rathkeale
Stoneville	98	Connello Lower	Rathkeale	Rathkeale
Stookeens	147	Coshlea	Kilbreedy Major	Kilmallock
Stradbally North	180	Clanwilliam	Stradbally	Limerick
Stradbally South	3	Clanwilliam	Stradbally	Limerick
Sugarhill	1,467	Glenquin	Monagay	Newcastle
Summerville	258	Kenry	Kilcornan	Rathkeale
Sunglen	131	Coonagh	Grean	Tipperary
Sunville	37	Coonagh	Grean	Tipperary
Sunville Lower	287	Coshlea	Particles	Kilmallock
Sunville Upper	554	Coshlea	Particles	Kilmallock
Tankardstwon	311	Smallcounty	Uregare	Kilmallock
Tankardstwon North	430	Coshma	Tankardstown	Kilmallock
Tankardstwon South	196	Coshma	Tankardstown	Kilmallock
Teermena	234	Glenquin	Monagay	Newcastle
Teermore	371	Coshlea	Kilbreedy Major	Kilmallock
Teernahilla	433	Connello Upper	Cloncagh	Newcastle
Teervena	104	Connello Upper	Cloncagh	Newcastle
Templeathea East	1,656	Shanid	Rathronan	Newcastle
Templeathea West	1,453	Shanid	Rathronan	Newcastle
Templebredon	66	Coonagh	Templebredon	Tipperary
Templeglentan East	789	Glenquin	Monagay	Newcastle
Templeglentan West	1,380	Glenquin	Monagay	Newcastle
Templemichael	280	Clanwilliam	Caherconlish	Limerick
Tervoe	526	Pubblebrien	Kilkeedy	Limerick
Thomastown	1,027	Coshlea	Kilfinnane	Kilmallock
Thomastown	952	Coshma	Kilbreedy Minor	Kilmallock
Thornfield	101	Clanwilliam	Killeenagarriff	Limerick
Tiermore	115	Shanid	Shanagolden	Glin
Tinnacullia	247	Kenry	Kilcorcoran	Rathkeale
Tinnakilla	596	Shanid	Kilmoylan	Glin
Tinnatarriff	318	Owneybeg	Tuogh	Limerick
Toberagarriff	265	Owneybeg	Abington	Limerick
Tobermalug	279	Clanwilliam	Caherconlish	Limerick
Tobermurry	230	Kenry	Kildimo	Rathkeale
Tobernea	45	Coshma	Kilbreedy Minor	Kilmallock
Tobernea East	465	Coshma	Effin	Kilmallock
Tobernea Middle	211	Coshma	Effin	Kilmallock
Tobernea West	458	Coshma	Effin	Kilmallock
Toberyquin	221	Clanwilliam	Caheravally	Limerick
Tomdeely North	776	Connello Lower	Tomdeely	Rathkeale
Tomdeely South	306	Connello Lower	Tomdeely	Rathkeale
Tonaree	64	Coonagh	Templebredon	Tipperary
Tonbaun	115	Pubblebrien	Crecora	Croom
Tonlegee	98	Kenry	Kildimo	Rathkeale
Tonteere	228	Clanwilliam	Ballybrood	Limerick
Toomaline Lower	495	Coonagh	Doon	Tipperary
Toomaline Upper	276	Coonagh	Doon	Tipperary
Toor	492	Coshlea	Particles	Kilmallock
Tooradoo	509	Shanid	Rathronan	Newcastle
Tooraleagan	250	Coshlea	Ballylanders	Mitchelstown
Tooraree Lower	907	Shanid	Kilfergus	Glin
Tooraree Upper	621	Shanid	Kilfergus	Glin
Tooreen	706	Coshma	Croom	Croom
Tooreen	436	Clanwilliam	Carrigparson	Limerick
Tooreendonnell	808	Shanid	Kilmoylan	Glin
Tooreennagreana	890	Glenquin	Killeedy	Newcastle
Toorlougher	492	Owneybeg	Abington	Limerick
Toornafulla	1,544	Glenquin	Killeedy	Newcastle
Toryhill	298	Pubblebrien	Croom	Croom
Towlerton	119	Clanwilliam	Kilmurry	Limerick
Treanboy	123	Glenquin	Monagay	Newcastle
Treanlewis	172	Kilmallock	St. Peter's & St. Paul's	Kilmallock
Treanmanagh	225	Coonagh	Grean	Tipperary
Treanmanagh	73	Coonagh	Tuoghcluggin	Tipperary
Tubbrid	172	Shanid	Kilmoylan	Rathkeale
Tulla	774	Coshlea	Darragh	Kilmallock
Tullabeg	68	Coonagh	Ballynaclogh	Tipperary
Tullabracky	377	Coshma	Tullabracky	Kilmallock
Tullaha	379	Glenquin	Killagholehane	Newcastle
Tullerboy	583	Coshma	Athlacca	Kilmallock
Tulligmacthomas	677	Connello Upper	Dromcolliher	Newcastle
Tulligoline North	1,054	Glenquin	Monagay	Newcastle
Tulligoline South	674	Glenquin	Monagay	Newcastle
Tullovin	601	Coshma	Croom	Croom
Tullovin	100	Coshma	Anhid	Croom
Tullyglass	149	Shanid	Kilfergus	Glin
Tullyleague	1,178	Shanid	Kilfergus	Glin
Tullyleak	141	Coshlea	Kilbreedy Major	Kilmallock
Tuogh	787	Kenry	Adare	Croom
Tuogh	733	Owneybeg	Tuogh	Limerick
Turagh	412	Owneybeg	Tuogh	Limerick
Tynacocka	47	Coshma	Uregare	Kilmallock
Uregare	343	Coshma	Uregare	Kilmallock
Waller's Island	1	Kenry	Kilcornan	Rathkeale
Walshestown	230	Glenquin	Mahoonagh	Newcastle
Waterpark	178	Clanwilliam	Killeenagarriff	Limerick
Wellfield	25	Coshma	Dromin	Kilmallock
White Island	20	Connello Lower	Tomdeely	Rathkeale
Whitehall	99	Clanwilliam	Carrigparson	Limerick
Williamstown	99	Clanwilliam	Fedamore	Limerick
Williamstown	25	Clanwilliam	Caheravally	Limerick
Wolfsburgess East	131	Connello Lower	Rathkeale	Rathkeale
Wolfsburgess West	144	Connello Lower	Rathkeale	Rathkeale
Wonderhill	252	Smallcounty	Kilteely	Kilmallock
Woodfarm	456	Clanwilliam	Caherconlish	Limerick
Woodfield	421	Connello Upper	Dromcolliher	Newcastle
Woodpark	158	Clanwilliam	Stradbally	Limerick
Woodroad	134	Clanwilliam	Stradbally	Limerick
Woodstock	27	Connello Upper	Ballingarry	Croom
Woodstown	188	Clanwilliam	Killeenagarriff	Limerick
