= Ballinard (civil parish) =

Civil parish in County Limerick, Ireland

Ballinard Baile an Aird
- Civil parish
- Location in Ireland
- Coordinates: 52°31′N 8°27′W
- Country: Ireland
- Province: Munster
- County: County Limerick

Ballinard (Irish: Baile an Aird, meaning 'the high town') is a civil parish and townland located in the eastern part of County Limerick, Ireland. The civil parish is part of the barony of Smallcounty. The largest population centre is the village of Herbertstown. The south-eastern part of the parish borders the parish of Kilcullane. Geologically, the parish rests on a substratum of limestone, except in some few places where the basalt rises.

== History ==
According to Lewis' Topography of Ireland (1837), the parish contained 867 inhabitants and comprised 1366 statute acres. The land was recorded as "in general good". The rectory was impropriate in Edward Deane Freeman. The tithes of the parish amounted to £148, 18 shillings, of which two-thirds were payable to the impropriator and the remainder to the vicar. Lewis recorded that there were two pay schools in the parish. The remains of "Ballynard Castle" were to be found on the hill by Ballinard townland itself. This castle was the main seat of a branch of the FitzGerald dynasty that was built in the fifteenth century. The Powel family, who gave their name to a neighbouring townland, had a mansion at Eaglestown.

== Ecclesiastical parish ==
Like all civil parishes, this civil parish is derived from, and co-extensive with a pre-existing Church of Ireland parish of the same name in the diocese of Cashel and Emly. The church mentioned in Lewis's survey is located in the townland of Ballinard. At that time, the church was in ruins.

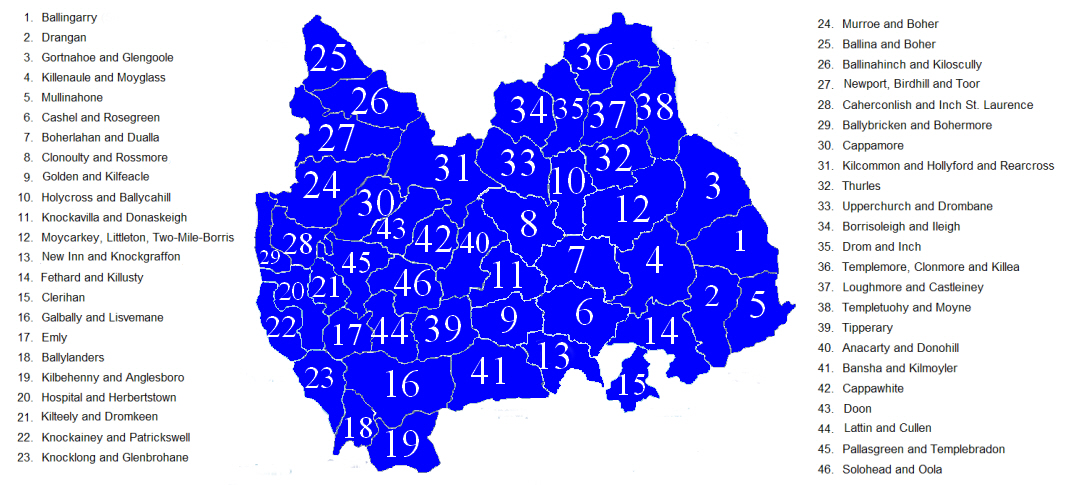
Parishes of the Catholic Archdiocese of Cashel and Emly

In the Catholic Church, the civil parish forms part of the ecclesiastical parish of "Herbertstown and Hospital" located at the western edge of the Roman Catholic Archdiocese of Cashel and Emly. There are two church buildings in the parish: the Sacred Heart Church, Herbertstown; St. John The Baptist, Hospital.

== Townlands ==
There are four townlands in the parish:

- Ballinard which constitutes 505 acres and contains the ruins of Ballinard Castle, the ruins of the Medieval parish church and the eastern side of the village of Herbertstown.
- Ballyloundash which constitutes 316 acres
- Cloghaviller which constitutes 545 acres and contains the ruins of Cloghaviller House
- Rootiagh which constitutes 274 acres.
