= Kilcullane =

Civil parish in County Limerick, Ireland

Kilcullane Cill Chathláin
- Civil parish
- Location in Ireland
- Coordinates: 52°30′N 8°29′W
- Country: Ireland
- Province: Munster
- County: County Limerick

Kilcullane (Irish: Cill Chathláin, meaning 'the church of Cathlán') is a civil parish and townland located in County Limerick, Ireland. The civil parish is in the barony of Smallcounty. It is located in east County Limerick near the village of Bruff. The north-eastern part of the parish borders the parish of Ballinard.

== Ecclesiastical parish ==
Like all civil parishes, this civil parish is derived from, and co-extensive with a pre-existing Church of Ireland parish of the same name in the diocese of Cashel and Emly. According to Lewis' Topography of Ireland (1837), the Medieval church located in the townland of Kilcullane was recorded as being in ruins.

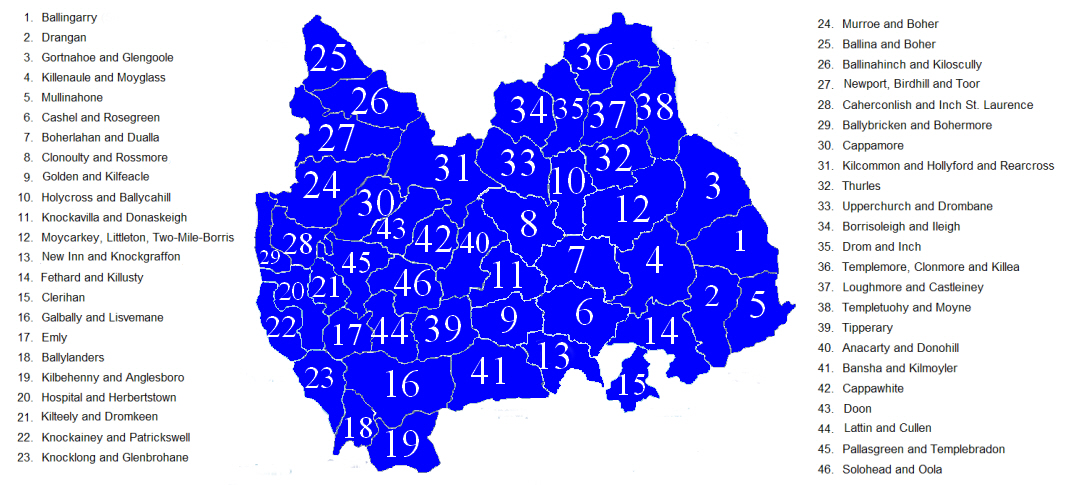
Parishes of the Catholic Archdiocese of Cashel and Emly

In the Catholic Church, the civil parish forms part of the ecclesiastical parish of "Herbertstown and Hospital" located at the western edge of the Roman Catholic Archdiocese of Cashel and Emly. There are two church buildings in the parish: the Sacred Heart Church, Herbertstown; St. John The Baptist, Hospital.

== Townlands ==
There are five townlands in the parish:

- Ballinscoola which constitutes 265 acres and is bounded to the west by the River Camogue
- Herbertstown (O'Grady) which constitutes 163 acres and forms the western side of the village of Herbertstown.
- Herbertstown (Powell) which constitutes 163 acres and forms the southern edge of the village of Herbertstown.
- Kilcullane which constitutes 724 acres and contains Kilcullane House alongside the ruins of a church and a castle.
- Gortnaskagh which constitutes 72 acres and contained Gortnaskagh Lodge.
