= Drominboy =

Townlands in County Limerick, Ireland

Drominboy An Dromainn Bhuí
- Interactive map of Drominboy
- Coordinates: 52°41′13″N 8°29′25″W
- Country: Ireland
- Province: Munster
- County: County Limerick
- Barony: Clanwilliam
- Civil parishes: Stradbally; Killeenagarriff
- Electoral division: Castleconnell

Area
  - Total: 1.40 km^{2} (0.54 sq mi)

Drominboy (Irish: An Dromainn Bhuí, "the yellow ridge") is a group of three townlands near Castleconnell in eastern County Limerick, Ireland: Drominboy, Drominboy Lower and Drominboy Upper. They lie in the electoral division of Castleconnell, with a postal address of Lisnagry.

== Etymology ==
The name comes from Irish dromainn ("ridge") and buí ("yellow"). In The Origin and History of Irish Names of Places, P. W. Joyce's index of names glosses Drominboy as "yellow little ridge". The Placenames Branch records these historical forms:

Year	Form
c. 1550	na dromann buide
1617	Dromenboy
1625	Drommonboy
1659	Dromenboy
1666	Dromonbegg
1840	Drominboy

== Geography ==
The three townlands are contiguous and together cover about 140 hectares (346 acres) in the barony of Clanwilliam. Drominboy proper is in the civil parish of Stradbally, and the Lower and Upper townlands are in Killeenagarriff.

Townland	Irish name	Area	Civil parish
Drominboy	An Dromainn Bhuí	37.33 hectares (92.2 acres)	Stradbally
Drominboy Lower	An Dromainn Bhuí Íochtarach	66.34 hectares (163.9 acres)	Killeenagarriff
Drominboy Upper	An Dromainn Bhuí Uachtarach	36.35 hectares (89.8 acres)	Killeenagarriff

== History ==
Drominboy lies in the hinterland of Castleconnell, a Shannon-side settlement long associated with the de Burgh lords of Clanwilliam, to whom the lordship was granted in 1199. The townland name is first recorded in the mid-16th century and appears in several spellings through the 17th century.

The three townlands appear as separate entries in the area returns of the 1891 and 1901 censuses. They are also listed in Griffith's Valuation (Limerick, 1851) and the 1901 and 1911 censuses, and these records can be searched online.

=== Historical buildings ===
==== Drominboy House ====
Drominboy House, located in Drominboy Lower, was the home of the McGrath family, who farmed there in the 19th and early 20th centuries. Michael McGrath (died 1881) and his wife Margaret (née Foley, died 1923) lived there, and their descendants include members of the Lane and Hourigan families. The mother of Michael Hourigan who served as Mayor of Limerick in 2004–2005 was born in Drominboy. Micheal's daughter Neasa Hourigan was a Green Party Teachta Dála for Dublin Central from 2020 to 2024. The family of Paddy Lane through his grandmother also originates from Drominboy.

Cllr Seán Hartigan of the Green Party, who currently owns Drominboy House, mentioned it in some newspaper articles.

==== Hourigan's ====
Hourigan's is a protected eighteenth-century thatched dwelling in Drominboy Upper recognised for its architectural and technical significance.

NIAH record	21900626
Location	Drominboy Upper, Lisnagry, County Limerick
Date of construction	c. 1770
Heritage rating	Regional
Categories of interest	Architectural, Technical
Features	Detached three-bay single-storey thatched house with roughcast rendered walls, sliding sash windows, an adjoining two-bay outbuilding, and rendered boundary piers
