= R514 road (Ireland) =

Regional road in County Limerick, Ireland

Coordinates: 52.524703°N 8.490622°W

R514 road
- Bóthar R514
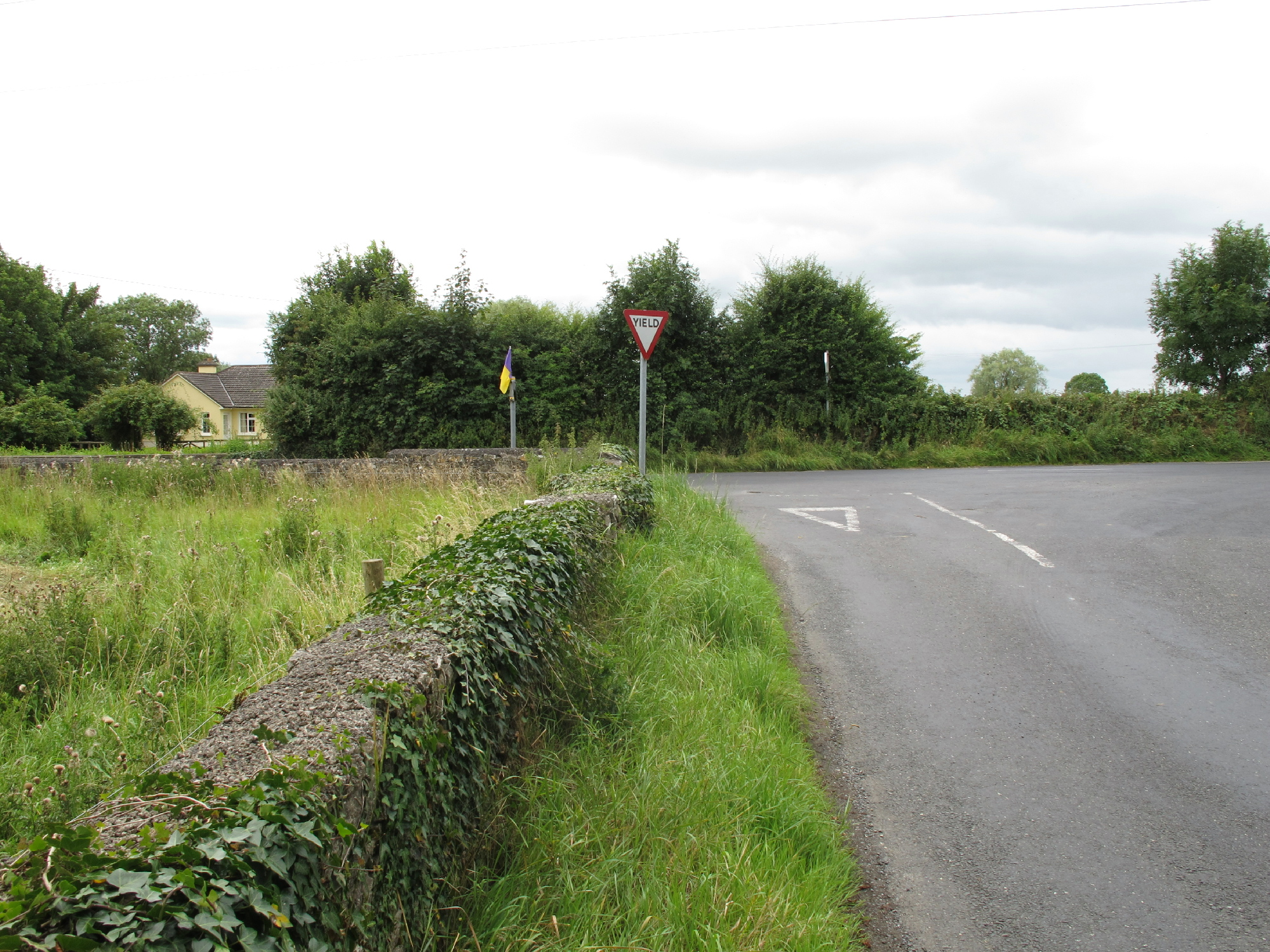
- Meeting the R514 at Coole Cross

Route information
- Length: 7.0 km (4.3 mi)

Major junctions
- From: R512 Rockstown
- Crosses River Camogue (Longford Bridge and Cloghansoun Bridge)
- To: R513 Herbertstown

Location
- Country: Ireland

Highway system
- Roads in Ireland; Motorways; Primary; Secondary; Regional

The R514 road is a regional road in Ireland, located in County Limerick.
