= Caherconlish =

Village in County Limerick, Ireland

Caherconlish Cathair Chinn Lis
- Village
- Location in Ireland
- Coordinates: 52°35′37″N 8°28′13″W
- Country: Ireland
- Province: Munster
- County: County Limerick
- Elevation: 60 m (200 ft)

Population (2022)
  - Total: 1,569
- Time zone: UTC+0 (WET)
  - Summer (DST): UTC-1 (IST (WEST))
- Irish Grid Reference: R681492
- Website: caherconlish.net

Caherconlish (Irish: Cathair Chinn Lis, meaning 'fort of the headland of the enclosure') is a village in County Limerick, Ireland. It is in a townland and civil parish of the same name.

== Location ==
The village of Caherconlish is located 16 km southeast of Limerick City in County Limerick. It is one half of the parish of Caherconlish/Caherline in the Roman Catholic Archdiocese of Cashel and Emly. The village's close proximity to Limerick City and the N24 to Tipperary and Waterford has meant a growth in both the size and population of the village, as Caherconlish is now considered as a commuter base for Limerick city. Neighbouring villages include Boher, Ballyneety, Herbertstown, Hospital, Kilteely and Pallasgreen.

The R513 connects Caherconlish to Hospital, Ballylanders and Mitchelstown in north County Cork.

The River Groody flows in a northern direction through Caherconlish, where it shortly joins the River Shannon downstream from the University of Limerick at Plassey.

The main focal point is the Millennium Centre and the village church.

== Sport ==
The main sports played in the village are hurling, gaelic football and soccer.

Caherline GAA is the local hurling club and they play in blue and white. The club is a member of the east division of Limerick GAA and has won the Limerick Senior Hurling Championship on three occasions in 1896, 1905 and 1907. Their biggest achievement in recent times was winning the Limerick Junior Hurling Championship for the fourth time in 2021. Their grounds are Father Hayes Memorial Park on the Mitchelstown road.

The Gaelic football club in the parish is called Caherconlish GAA and they play in blue, black and white. They too play at Father Hayes Memorial Park.

Caherconlish AFC is the local soccer club in the village. The club playing colours are amber yellow and green. The club consists of 188 players, 166 underage and 23 adult players (as of 2021). The club plays in the Limerick District School Boy league (underage) and Limerick District league (Adult). The club is located at Caherconlish AFC grounds adjacent to Oakley Lawns Residential Estate.

== People ==
- Nóirín Ní Riain, singer

== See also ==
- List of towns and villages in Ireland
