= De Valera's Cottage =

- Teachín De Valera
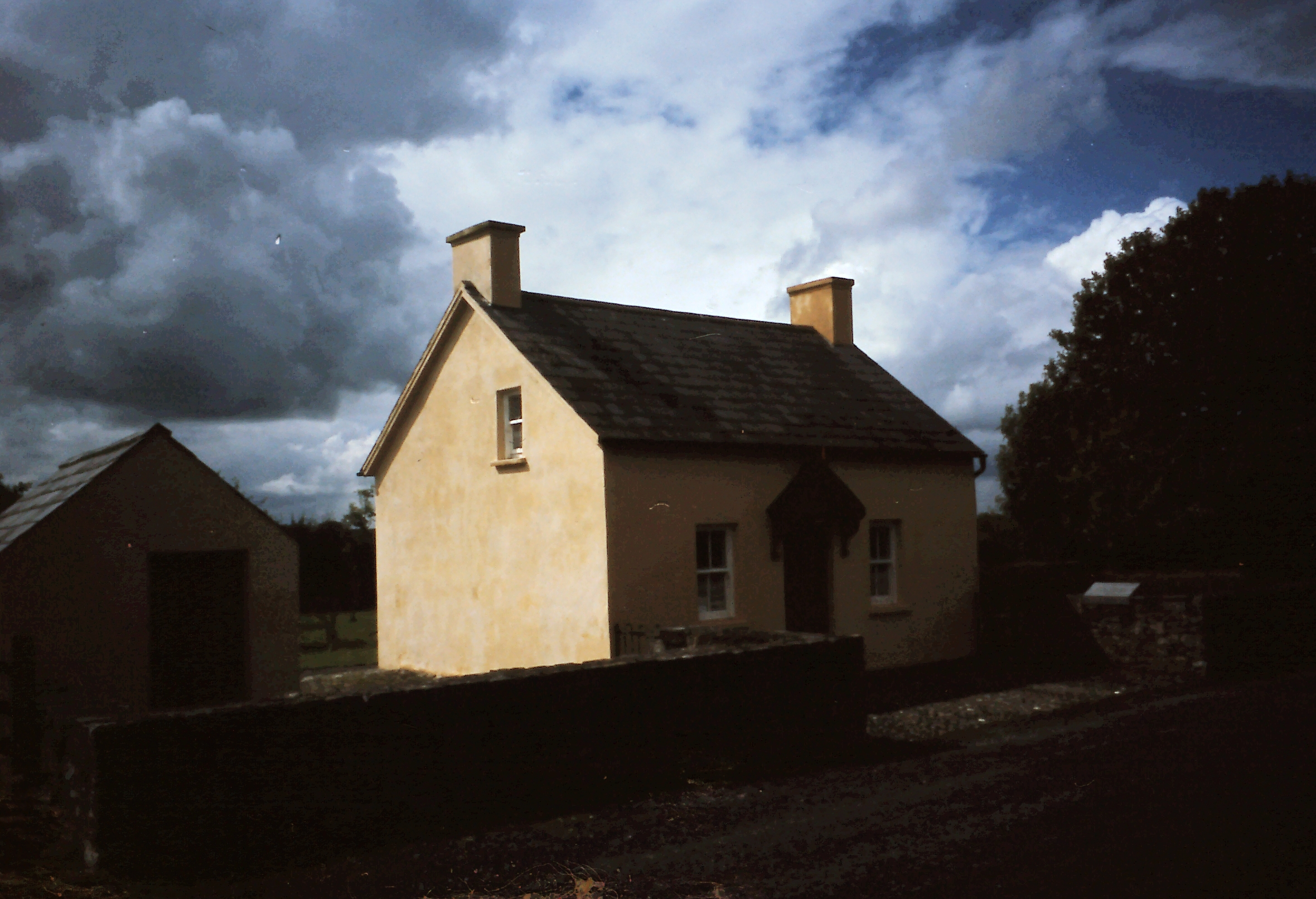
- Photograph of De Valera's Cottage

- Location within Ireland

General information
- Status: Museum
- Type: cottage
- Architectural style: Vernacular
- Location: Knockmore, Bruree, Ireland
- Coordinates: 52.433639°N 8.657111°W
- Elevation: 54 m (177 ft)
- Construction started: 1885
- Owner: Office of Public Works

Technical details
- Material: cast iron, timber, slate, concrete, limestone
- Floor count: 1

Design and construction
- Designations

National monument of Ireland
- Official name: De Valera's Cottage
- Reference no.: 576
- Known for: Childhood home of Éamon de Valera

De Valera's Cottage is a cottage and National Monument located in County Limerick, Ireland. It was the former home of the Irish rebel leader, and later President of Dáil Éireann, President of the Executive Council of the Irish Free State, Taoiseach and President of Ireland, Éamon de Valera (1882–1975) during his youth.

== Location ==
De Valera's Cottage is located 1 km (0.6 mi) north of Bruree, on the road to Athlacca.

== History ==
The house is a labourer's cottage, built in 1885 by Kilmallock Poor Law Union.

Born in New York City in 1882, de Valera (then known as George, and later Edward or Eddie) was brought to Ireland by his uncle Ned in 1885, following the death of his father Juan Vivion de Valera, and lived at this cottage. Even after his mother remarried, de Valera remained in Ireland, living at this cottage outside Bruree with his grandmother Elizabeth Coll, her son Patrick and her daughter Hannie. De Valera worked hard on the family farm, a mere half-acre; they also used "the long farm", grazing cattle on the roadside grass. This was illegal, so de Valera kept watch for Royal Irish Constabulary policemen and had to pretend to be moving the cattle across the road if the police saw him.

As a teenager he walked from there to C.B.S. Charleville during schooldays, a distance of 11 km (7 miles) each morning and evening (the family could not afford a bicycle).

De Valera regularly visited the cottage in later life. It is today a museum containing de Valera memorabilia, including the trunk he brought back from New York.

== Description ==
The house is a detached three-bay single-storey building.

== In culture ==
Poet Thomas McCarthy wrote, in 1984, "Returning to De Valera's Cottage", about the strange shadow the cottage cast over the village.

== See also ==
- Michael Collins Birthplace
