= River Camogue =

Coordinates: 52.363517°N 8.163148°W

River Camogue River Camoge
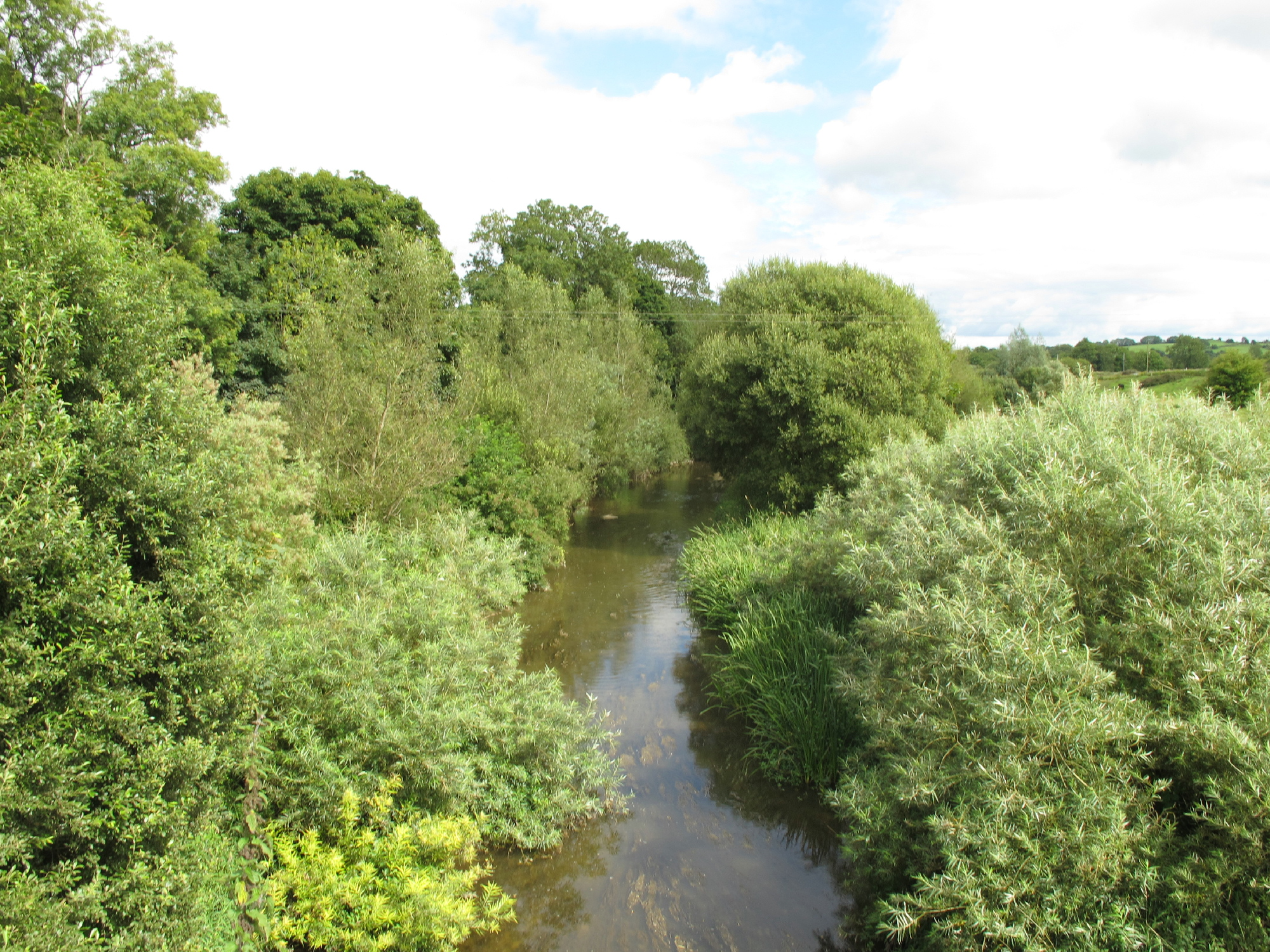
- Near the R512 road in County Limerick
- Etymology: Irish for "little crooked [river]"
- Native name: An Chamóg (Irish)

Location
- Country: Ireland
- Cities: Knocklong, Hospital

Physical characteristics
- Source
  - location: Bohercarron, County Tipperary
- Mouth: River Maigue
  - location: Croom, County Limerick
- Length: 30 km (19 mi)
- Basin size: 243.6 km^{2} (94.1 sq mi)
- Discharge
  - average: 34.10 m^{3}/s (1,204 cu ft/s)

Basin features
- River system: Shannon
- Tributaries
  - right: Mahore River

The River Camoge or Camogue (/ˈkæmoʊɡ/; Irish: An Chamóg) is a river in Munster, Ireland. It is a tributary of the Maigue, which is itself a Shannon tributary.

== Course ==
The River Camogue rises in County Tipperary near Emly. It enters County Limerick and is bridged by the R513, R514 and R516 outside Hospital, and meets the Mahore River. It flows northwards through Herbertstown and then turns westwards, flowing under the R514, R512 and R511 before entering Greybridge, where it gives its name to the Camogue Rovers GAA club. The Camogue flows on under the R516 and drains into the Maigue in Anhid East, about one mile (1.6 km) upriver of Croom.

== Wildlife ==
The River Camogue is a brown trout fishery. Slurry pollution caused a major fish kill in 2015. It was formerly famous for the "Camogue Eels", sold in London as long ago as the 12th century.

== See also ==
- Rivers of Ireland
