= Bruree =

Village in County Limerick, Ireland

Bruree Brú Rí
- Village
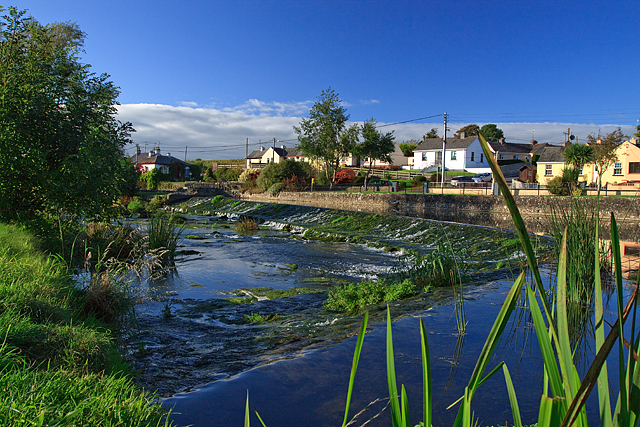
- River Maigue at Bruree

- Location in Ireland
- Coordinates: 52°25′27″N 8°39′43″W
- Country: Ireland
- Province: Munster
- County: County Limerick

Government
  - Dáil Éireann: Limerick County

Population (2022)
  - Total: 641
- Time zone: UTC+0 (WET)
  - Summer (DST): UTC-1 (IST (WEST))
- Area code: 063

Bruree (Irish: Brú Rí, meaning 'abode of kings') is a village in south-eastern County Limerick, Ireland, on the River Maigue. It takes its name from the nearby ancient royal fortress, the alternative name of which from the earliest times into the High Middle Ages was Dún Eochair Maigue or the "fortress on the brink of the maigue". Other very old spellings and names include Brugh Righ, and Brugh Ri. The village is in a townland and civil parish of the same name.

== Location ==
The village of Bruree is located on the Maigue river two kilometres off the main N20 Limerick-Cork road in south County Limerick. It forms one half of the parish of Rockhill-Bruree in the Roman Catholic Diocese of Limerick. Rockhill and Bruree are electoral divisions in the Cappamore-Kilmallock local electoral area.

Bruree is six kilometres north-west of Kilmallock, eight kilometres north of Charleville and twenty-seven kilometres south of Limerick city. Neighbouring towns and villages include Kilmallock, Charleville, Effin, Athlacca, Banogue and Ballyagran.

== History ==
Bruree was once a seat and alternative capital of the ancient Kings of Munster. At some point later it came into the possession of the Uí Fidgenti and was their capital until the late 12th century. Before them it may have belonged to the Dáirine or Érainn, being named by Geoffrey Keating as a fortress built by Cú Roí mac Dáire. An early king and semi-mythological ancestor of the Eóganachta and Uí Fidgenti, Ailill Aulom, is then found at the fortress in the Cath Maige Mucrama cycle. The historical Eóganacht king Óengus mac Nad Froích is also found here in one legend.

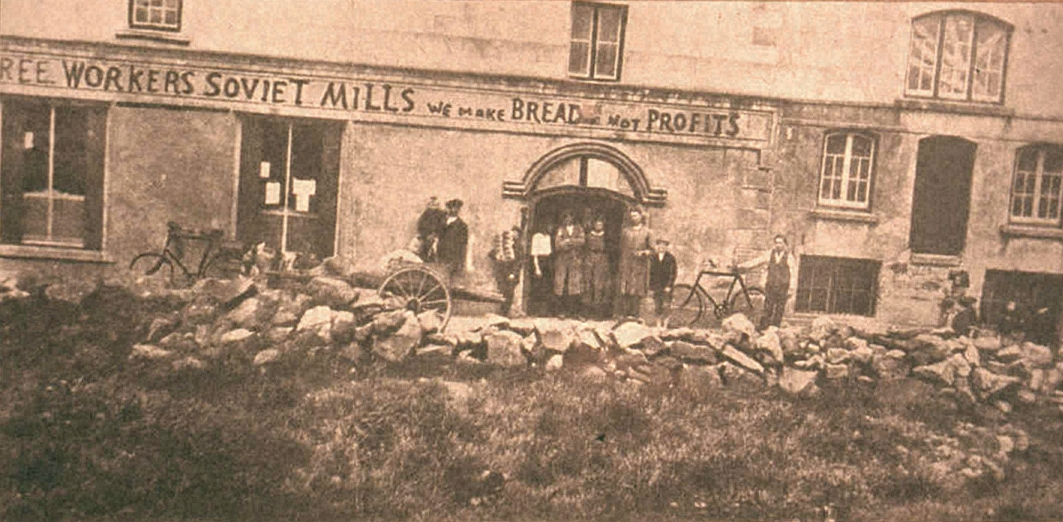
Bruree Workers Soviet Mills, pictured in 1921

On the 26 August, a month after the 1919 - 1921 Irish War of Independence ended, workers in Bruree seized the mill they worked in and hoisted the red flag over the building & hung a banner over the building proclaiming "Bruree Workers Soviet Mills – We Make Bread Not Profits". The soviet lasted until 3 September 1921. This was one of over 100 soviets that popped up in Ireland during the War of Independence and the Civil War, the most notable of which was the Limerick Soviet

The village also played a role in the Irish Civil War during the Battle of Kilmallock.

== Sport ==
As in much of County Limerick, the main sport in Bruree is hurling, but Gaelic and association football are also played.

The Gaelic Athletic Association club in the parish is Bruree GAA which is a member of the south division of Limerick GAA. The club concentrates on hurling, but Gaelic football is also played. Bruree have won the Limerick Senior Hurling Championship on two occasions in 1893 and 2006 when they beat Patrickswell in the final.

The footballers of Bruree won the County Junior Football Championship in 2010 and reached the Munster final where they were beaten by St. Mary's Cahirciveen of County Kerry. They were relegated from the intermediate grade in 2012 and play at the junior grade.

== People ==
- Catherine Coll, the mother of President of Ireland Éamon de Valera, was from Bruree, and he was taken by her family to be raised here. De Valera's Cottage is a National Monument in the Knockmore townland.
- Very Reverend Eugene Sheehy was parish priest here in the early 1890s and had a huge influence on De Valera, who served as an altar boy in Bruree Church, during that period.

== See also ==
- List of towns and villages in Ireland
