= Grange stone circle =

Stone circle in County Limerick, Ireland

- Lios na Gráinsí
- Fort of the Grange
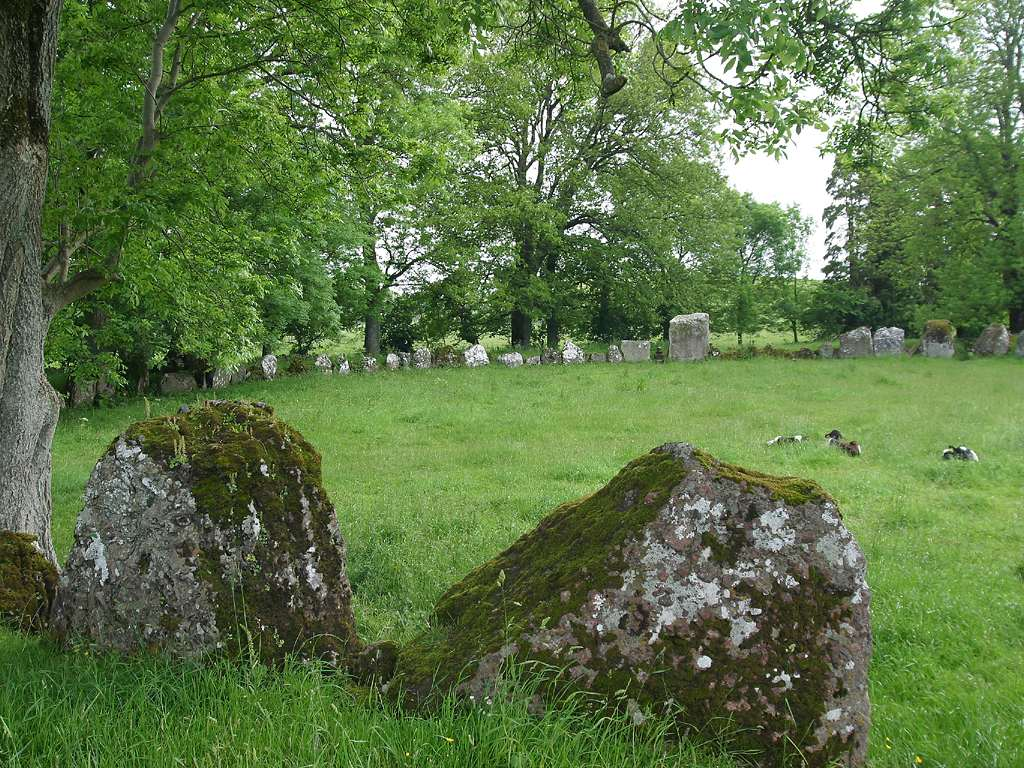
- Grange stone circle, Ireland

- Location of site in Ireland
- 52°30′51″N 8°32′31″W
- Location: Lough Gur, County Limerick, Ireland

Site notes
- Height: 4 metres (13 ft) (highest stone)
- Management: National Monument Service

National monument of Ireland
- Reference no.: 247

Grange stone circle (Irish: Lios na Gráinsí, meaning 'Fort of the Grange') is a stone circle in County Limerick, Ireland. It is located 300m west of Lough Gur, 4 km north of Bruff. The Limerick-Kilmallock road is nearby.

It is estimated to be 4,000-years-old, dating from the Bronze Age.

== Features ==
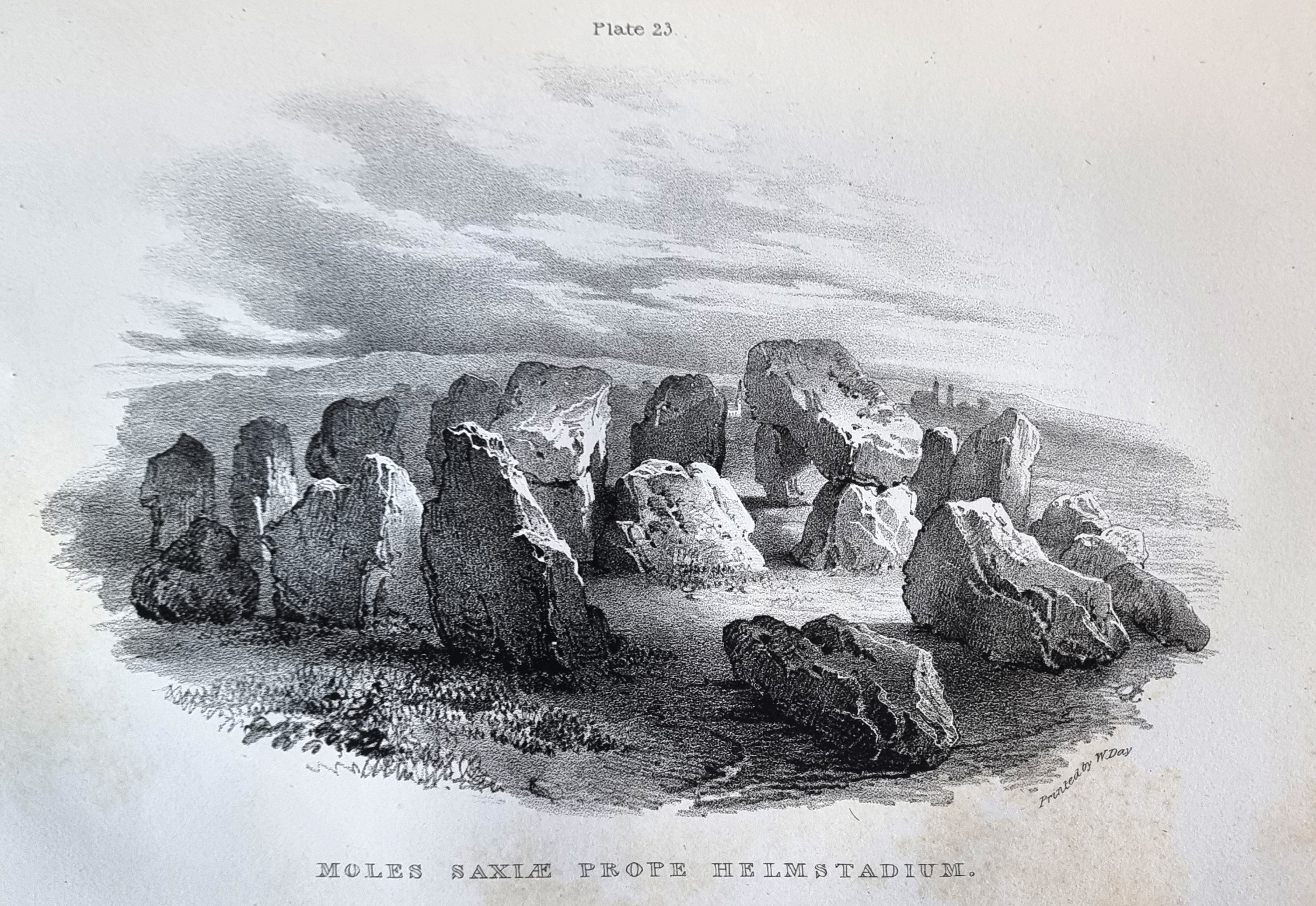
Grange stone circle, County Limerick, Ireland, 1829

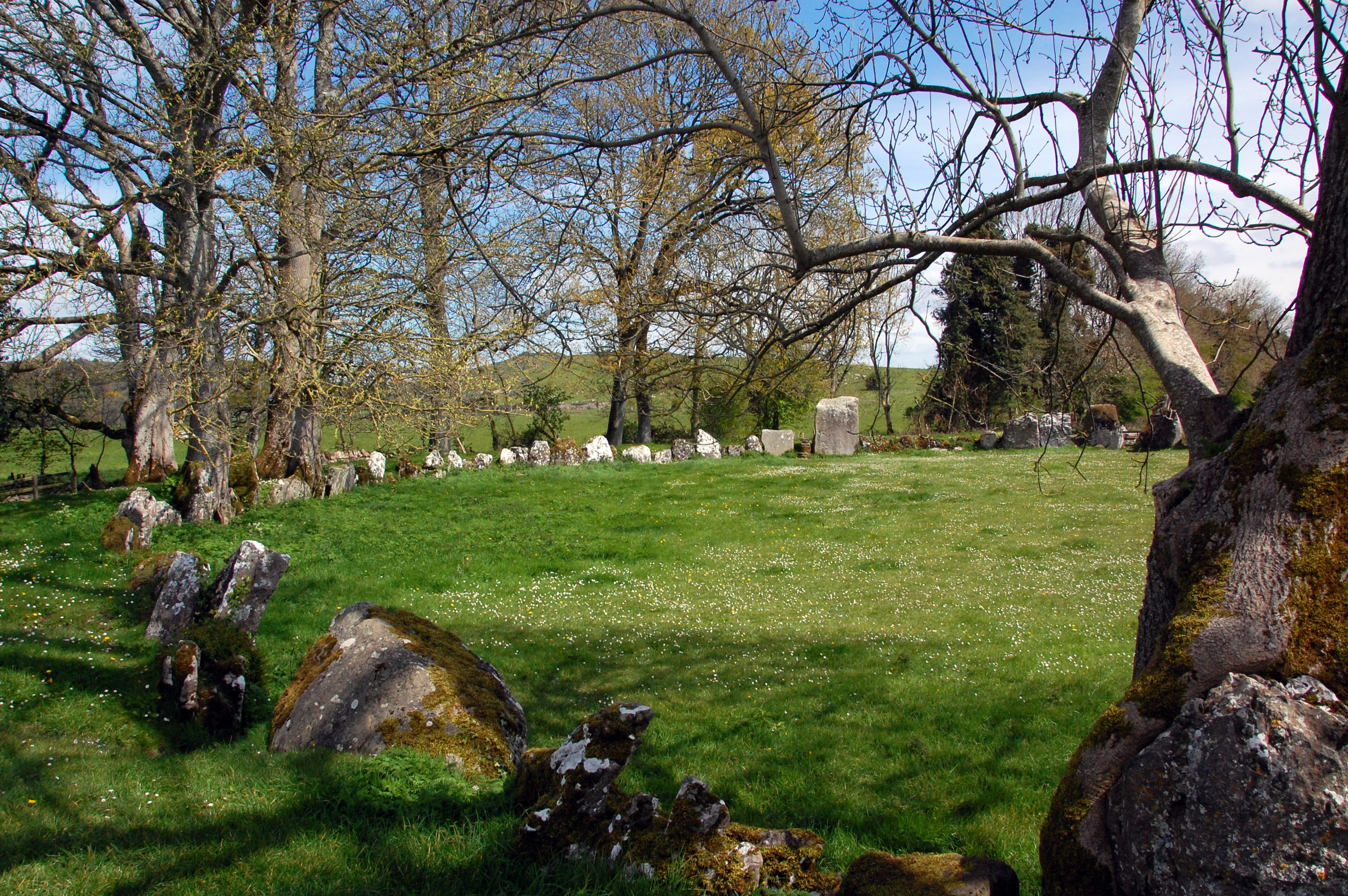
Grange Stone Circle is the largest stone circle in Ireland.

The largest stone is Rannach Chruim Duibh (Crom Dubh's Division) and is over 4m high and weighs 40 tonnes. The entrance of the circle is aligned with the rising sun at the summer solstice. A short distance to the north-north east of the main stone circle, is a second smaller circle, also constructed of large stones. To the north of this is a large leaning standing stone. Around 1/3rd of the site has been excavated with old pottery and human remains being found within it, during the summer solstice many people, including druids meet up there, it's still a very sacred place to many people. On Wednesday, 17 August 2022, there was a remarkable discovery of carvings on one of the stones of Grange Stone Circle at Lough Gur, County Limerick, by Ken Williams, a leading Irish archaeological photographer. He has developed methods of lighting stones to photograph them to maximum effect and he has found a number of new carvings over the years in this way. He was returning to check the stones at Grange Stone Circle for carvings as part of his current research, people still leave money and crystals there.
