= Herbertstown =

Village in County Limerick, Ireland

Herbertstown Baile Hiobaird / Cathair Fuiseóg
- Village
- Location in Ireland
- Coordinates: 52°31′06″N 08°28′05″W
- Country: Ireland
- Province: Munster
- County: County Limerick
- Time zone: UTC+0 (WET)
  - Summer (DST): UTC-1 (IST (WEST))

Herbertstown (Irish: Baile Hiobaird / Cathair Fuiseóg) is a village in south-eastern County Limerick, Ireland. It is part of the ecclesiastical parish of "Hospital and Herbertstown", in the Roman Catholic Archdiocese of Cashel and Emly. Herbertstown is in the centre of the electoral division of Cahercorney stretching from Ballingoola in the north-east, Ballyloundash in the east and Kilcullane in the south.

== Location ==
Herbertstown is located in the south east of the county, 6 miles (10 km) north-east of Bruff, on the road from Limerick city to Hospital. The village is split between two civil parishes: Kilcullane and Ballinard. Both parishes are in the barony of Smallcounty and in the district electoral division of Caherconlish.

The western part of the village, in the townland of Herbertstown (O'Grady), is in the civil parish of Kilcullane which contains five townlands: Herbertstown (O'Grady), Herbertstown (Powell), Ballinscoola, Kilcullane, and Gortnaskagh.

The eastern and main part of the village, in the townland of Ballinard, is in the civil parish of Ballinard which contains four townlands: Ballinard, Ballyloundash, Cloghaviller and Rootiagh.

The River Camogue (a tributary of the River Maigue) flows to the west of the village, parallel to the main street. The land in between is liable to flooding.

== History ==
=== Ancient history ===
The present barony of Smallcounty (or Small County) was the ancient Deis-Beg. In this district is the hill now called Knockainy (with the village of Knockainy at its foot), formerly called Ainè, or Ainè-Clich, from the territory of Cliach or Ara-Cliach, which lay round the hill. The main clans in the barony were:

- O'Ciarmhaie (or O'Kerwick), chief of Eoganacht Aine (now the parish of Knockaney)
- O'Muldoon, also a chief of Eoganacht Aine, same as O' Kerwick.
- O'Kenealy, chief of Eoganacht Grian Guara, a district comprising parts of the baronies of Coshma and Small County.
- O'Gunning, chief of Crioch Saingil and Aosgreine. Both the territories are comprised in the barony of Small County.

=== 19th century ===
According to Samuel Lewis's Topographical Dictionary of Ireland (1837), Herbertstown then had "a constabulary police station, and has large pig fairs on Jan. 15th, March 17th, June 28th, and Nov. 7th. Here is a large R. C. chapel, which was erected in 1836 at an expense of £800."

== Services and amenities ==
The village has one pub, a Catholic church and a farmers' co-op. Lough Gur is nearby.

Local sports clubs include Hospital-Herbertstown GAA club and soccer club Herbertstown AFC.

== See also ==
- List of towns and villages in Ireland
