= Garryspillane =

Village in County Limerick, Ireland

Garryspillane Garraí Uí Spealáin
- Village
- Location in Ireland
- Coordinates: 52°24′42″N 08°22′45″W
- Country: Ireland
- Province: Munster
- County: County Limerick
- Time zone: UTC+0 (WET)
  - Summer (DST): UTC-1 (IST (WEST))

Garryspillane (Irish: Garraí Uí Spealáin meaning "the garden of Ó Spealáin"), is a village in southern County Limerick, Ireland, located near Knocklong on the R513 road. It is around 15 km west of Tipperary Town. Amenities in the village include a pub, a garage (service station), and a co-op. The Morning Star River flows near the village. It is a mainly agricultural area.

== Sport ==
The local hurling team is known as Garryspillane, although the pitch is located in the nearby village of Knocklong.

== See also ==
- List of towns and villages in Ireland
