= R514 road =

R514 road may refer to:

- R514 road (Ireland)
- R514 road (South Africa)
