= Hospital Church =

- Teampall an Ospidéil
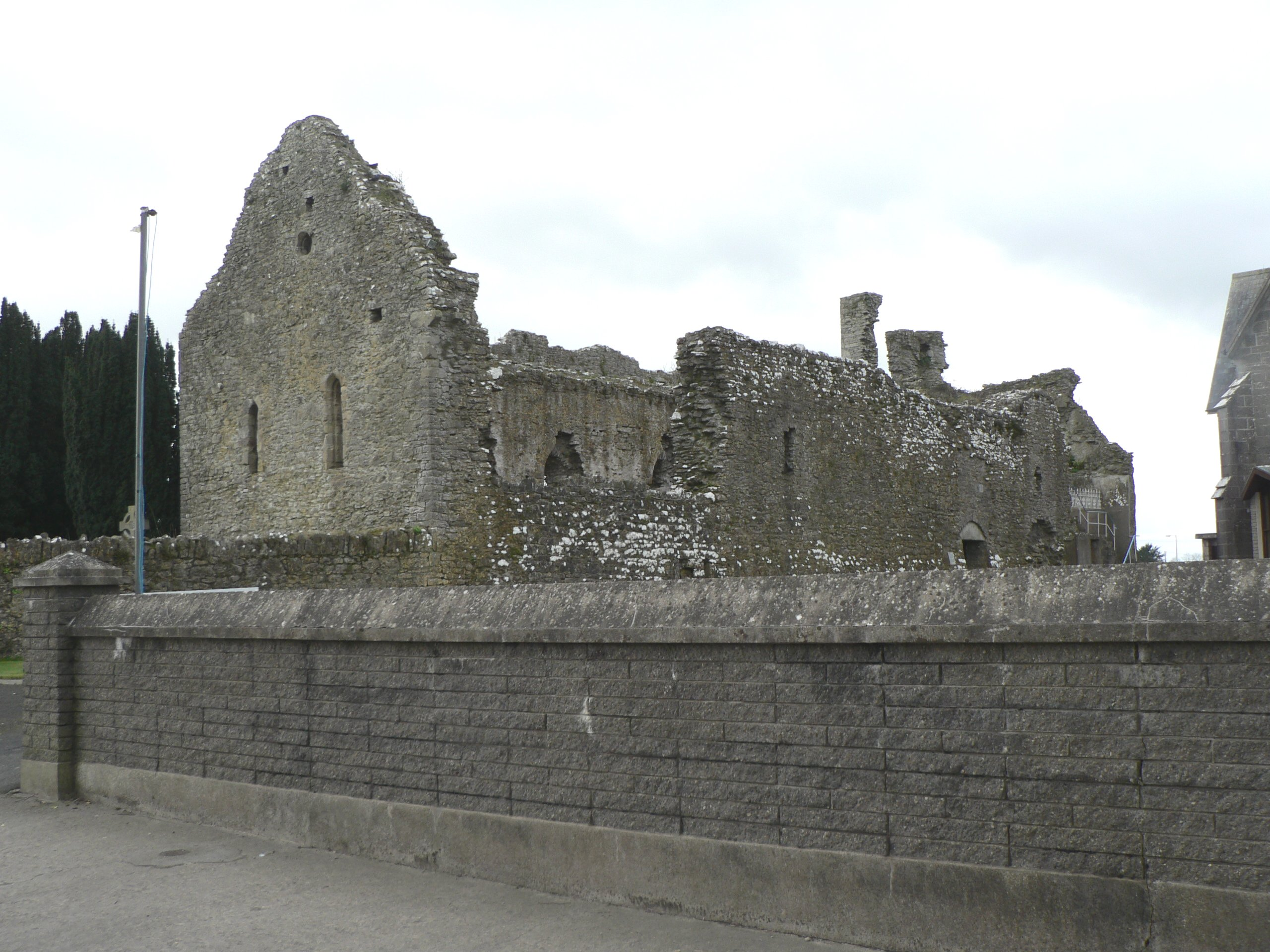

- Location within Ireland
- 52.476269°N 8.432607°W
- Location: Barrysfarm, Hospital, County Limerick
- Country: Ireland
- Denomination: Catholic (pre-Reformation)

History
- Status: ruined

Architecture
- Functional status: inactive
- Years built: by 1215
- Closed: 1540

Specifications
- Length: 35 m (115 ft)
- Width: 9 m (30 ft)
- Materials: stone, mortar

Administration
- Diocese: Limerick
Designations
National monument of Ireland
- Official name: Hospital Church
- Reference no.: 194

Hospital Church is a ruined medieval fortified church of the Knights Hospitaller in Hospital, County Limerick, Ireland. It is a National Monument.

== History ==
The church was founded before 1215 by Geoffrey de Marisco (d. 1245) as a commandery of the Knights Hospitaller who had owned land in the area since 1200. It was dissolved in 1540 during the Dissolution of the Monasteries and then leased, along with its contents, to Captain William Apsley and later to the Browne family; a new church was later built next to it.

== Building ==
The church was built for defence with high walls, prominent base batter and narrow arched windows. The tower at the west end had a barrel vault on the second floor, some of which survives. Architectural fragments and a medieval carving of the crucifixion have been set into the west wall. The tops of two tombs with effigies dating to the 13th–14th century have been placed upright against the east interior wall: a tomb of a knight (possibly Geoffrey de Marisco) and a badly damaged double tomb of a knight and his wife.
