= R512 road =

R512 road may refer to:

- R512 road (Ireland)
- R512 road (South Africa)
