= R513 road =

R513 road may refer to:

- R513 road (Ireland)
- R513 (South Africa)
