= Clarina, County Limerick =

Village in County Limerick, Ireland

Clarina Clár Aidhne
- Village
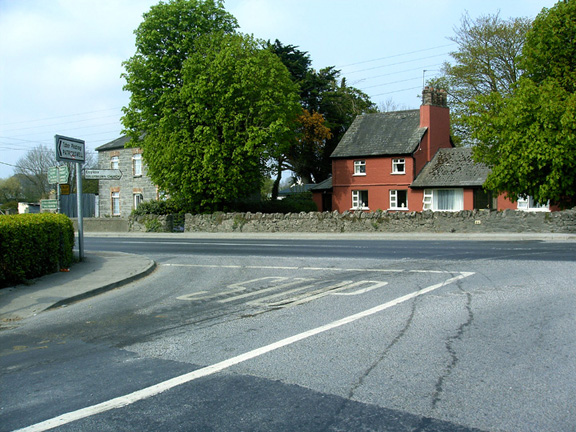
- Clarina crossroads

- Location in Ireland
- Coordinates: 52°38′02″N 08°43′47″W
- Country: Ireland
- Province: Munster
- County: County Limerick
- Time zone: UTC+0 (WET)
  - Summer (DST): UTC-1 (IST (WEST))

Clarina (Irish: Clár Aidhne) is a village in County Limerick in the province of Munster, Ireland. It lies between Mungret and Kildimo on the N69 road 8 km (5 mi) west of the centre of Limerick city. The village is close to the River Maigue is a tributary of the River Shannon and enters the Shannon Estuary between Limerick city and the mouth of the Deel river, Askeaton, County Limerick.

Clarina is within the Patrickswell-Ballybrown parish. The main area of interest is the nearby location of Carrigogunnell Castle.

== Schools ==
Clarina has a mixed national (primary) school called St. Joseph's National School.

== History ==
Clarina Castle, also known as Elm Park, was a country house designed for the 3rd Baron Clarina in the late 1820s. Further work was undertaken by Rawson Carroll in the 1880s. It was demolished in the 1960s.

== See also ==
- List of towns and villages in Ireland
