= Lough Gur =

Lake in County Limerick, Ireland

- Loch Goir (Irish)
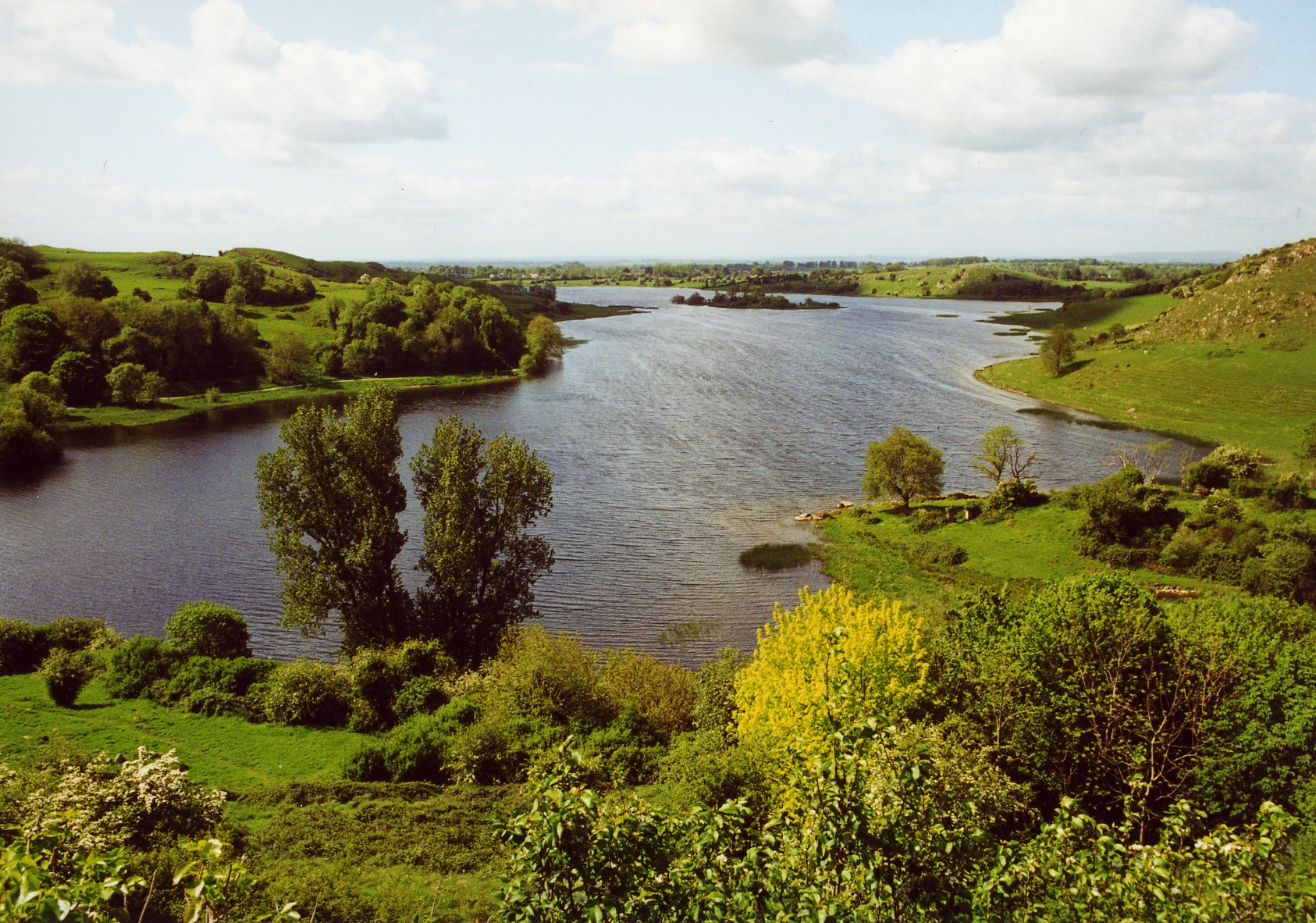

- Location in Ireland
- Location: County Limerick
- Coordinates: 52°30′58.97″N 8°31′59.80″W
- Basin countries: Ireland
- Surface area: 0.78 km^{2} (0.30 sq mi)
- Average depth: 1.5 m (4 ft 11 in)
- Max. depth: 3.8 m (12 ft)
- Water volume: 1.2 hm^{3} (970 acre⋅ft)
- Residence time: 0.21 years

Lough Gur (Irish: Loch Goir) is a lake in County Limerick, Ireland between the towns of Herbertstown and Bruff. The lake forms a horseshoe shape at the base of Knockadoon Hill and some rugged elevated countryside. It is one of Ireland's most important archaeological sites. Humans have lived near Lough Gur since about 3000 BC and there are numerous megalithic remains there.

Grange stone circle (the largest stone circle in Ireland) and a dolmen are located near the lake. The remains of at least three crannogs are present, and remains of Stone Age houses have been unearthed on Knockadoon. Other Early Medieval house outlines are known as "The Spectacles". A number of ring forts are found in the area, with one hill fort overlooking the lake. Some are Irish national monuments.

It is here that the 14th-century lord of Munster and poet Gearóid Iarla, votary of the Goddess Áine, is said to sleep in a cave and emerge at the time of Ireland's need to gallop around the lake on his great silver-shod white horse.

A visitors' centre is open beside Lough Gur, along with a car park and picnic area. A gradual shoreline is present at the visitor area, with a shallow section of lake reaching up to the maintained lawn. As a result, the area is often used for water sports, though motorised craft are banned on the lake.

There is a castle, or tower house (closed to visitors) near the entrance to the carpark. Named Bourchier's Castle after Sir George Bourchier, the son of the second Earl of Bath, it lies at the neck of the peninsula around which the lake washes. There is some other architecture dating from more recent times, with the ruins of an early Christian church by the road leading down to the lake. At the far end of the lake are the ruins of a Norman castle, Black Castle, which is reached by a hillside walk along the east side of the lake. This is one of the keeps used during the Desmond Rebellions and is probably the place where the Earl of Desmond secured his authority in 1573 after casting off his English apparel and donning Irish garments on his return to Munster from London.

Lough Gur is a famous location for finding Irish Elk skeletons. The National Museum of Ireland – Natural History has specimens from Lough Gur as does Leeds Museums and Galleries in the UK.

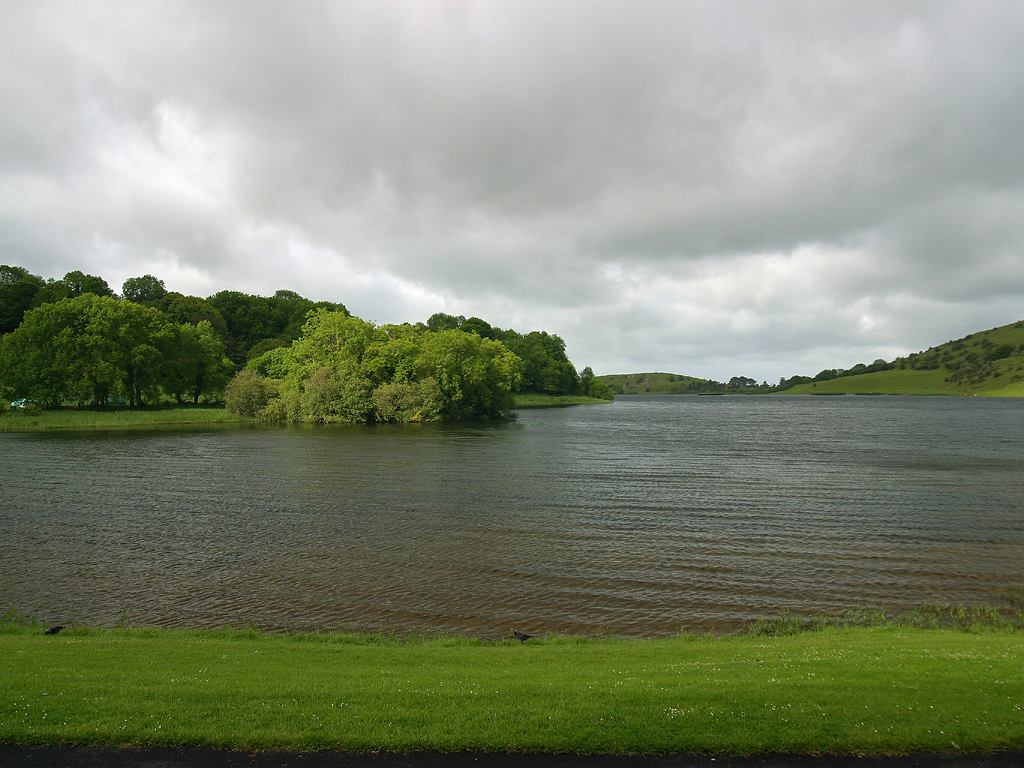
The north end of Lough Gur reaches up to a maintained lawn at the visitor area at the lake. The clump of trees jutting out into the water hide the site of a crannog

Lough Gur is one of Ireland's most important archaeological sites.

== See also ==
- Early history of Ireland
- List of loughs in Ireland
