= Carrigogunnell =

Medieval Irish fortification, County Limerick, Ireland

Coordinates: 52°38′48″N 8°44′33″W

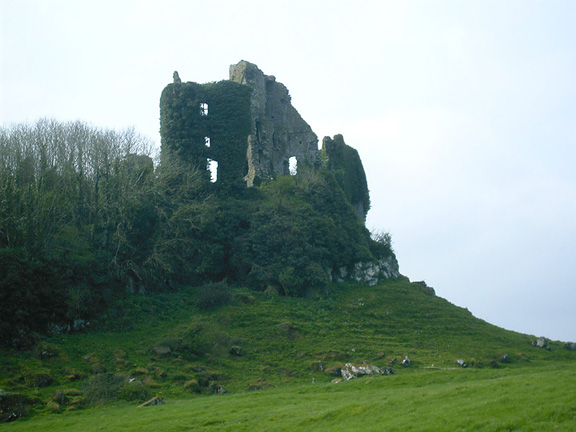
Carrigogunnell Castle ruins, north side (2007)

Carrigogunnell Castle (Irish: Chairrge Ó gCoinneall) is a medieval Irish fortification near the village of Clarina, on the banks of the River Shannon in County Limerick.

The structure dates to at least the early 13th century, and was slighted in September 1691 after being captured during the second siege of Limerick.

== Description ==
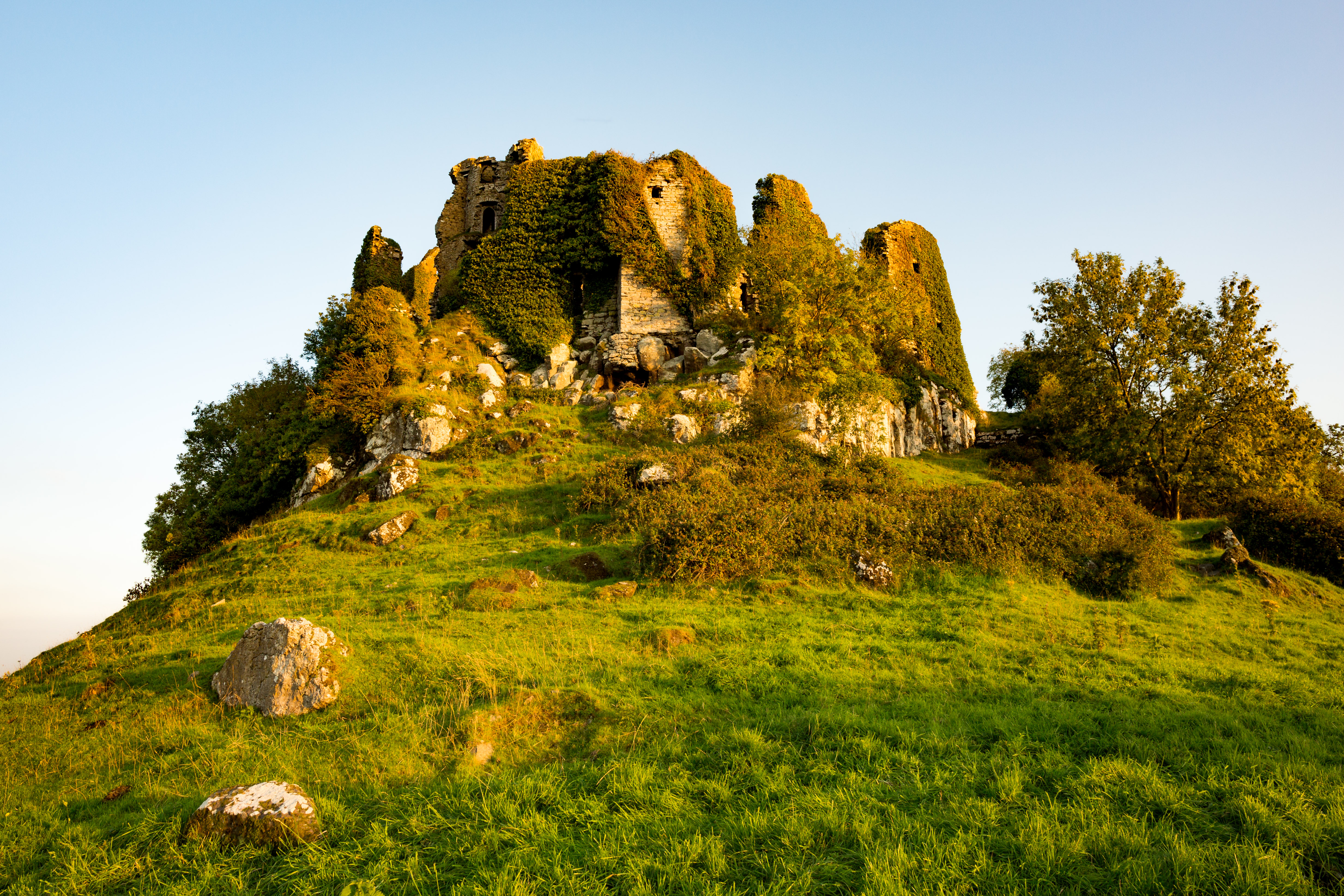
Ruins of upper bailey, west wall (2015)

The castle is built on outcrop trap rock of volcanic origin that overlooks the low lands of County Limerick, and the River Shannon.

Westropp 1908 claimed that the plan showed little appreciation of defensive science, and as a result attributed it to the Irish Gaelic tribe of the Dalcassians. The main (southern) gateway he thought poorly defended, lacking side towers, and with walls under 5 feet (1.5 m) thick - the gate itself led to by a shallow slope. The absence of towers at the junctions of walls, and the confused plan of buildings within the defenses were taken by Westropp as evidence of the place being only a suitable as a fortified residence, and not fitted for defense of an assault or siege. The main southern gate was the only exit, excluding a sally port on the west side leading to the crags of the rock formation.

The castle had an outer ward of around 1 acre (0.40 ha) in area, approximately harp shaped in plan, with a tower in the SW corner. Much of the west wall had been removed (1908). A large two storey skewed-rectangularish building was located on the NE corner of the ward, suggested without any obvious remaining evidence to have been a chapel.

The inner (upper) ward was inset in the NW corner of the castle, with a 100 feet (30 m) range of two story buildings along the west wall, showing at least two periods of construction; there was a keep in the northwestmost corner; a range of accommodation adjacent to it to the east; and a tower and staircase on the south side. The buildings are of well-cut local limestone - and not of the rock of the outcrop.

The keep was over 50 feet (15 m) high, with 5 storeys and a spiral stair; by ca. 1908 only the outwall and parts of the southern wall remained. It shows architectural indicators dating it to the 14th of 15th centuries. To the east of the keep was a three-story residence, probably 16th century.

== Name - etymology and history ==
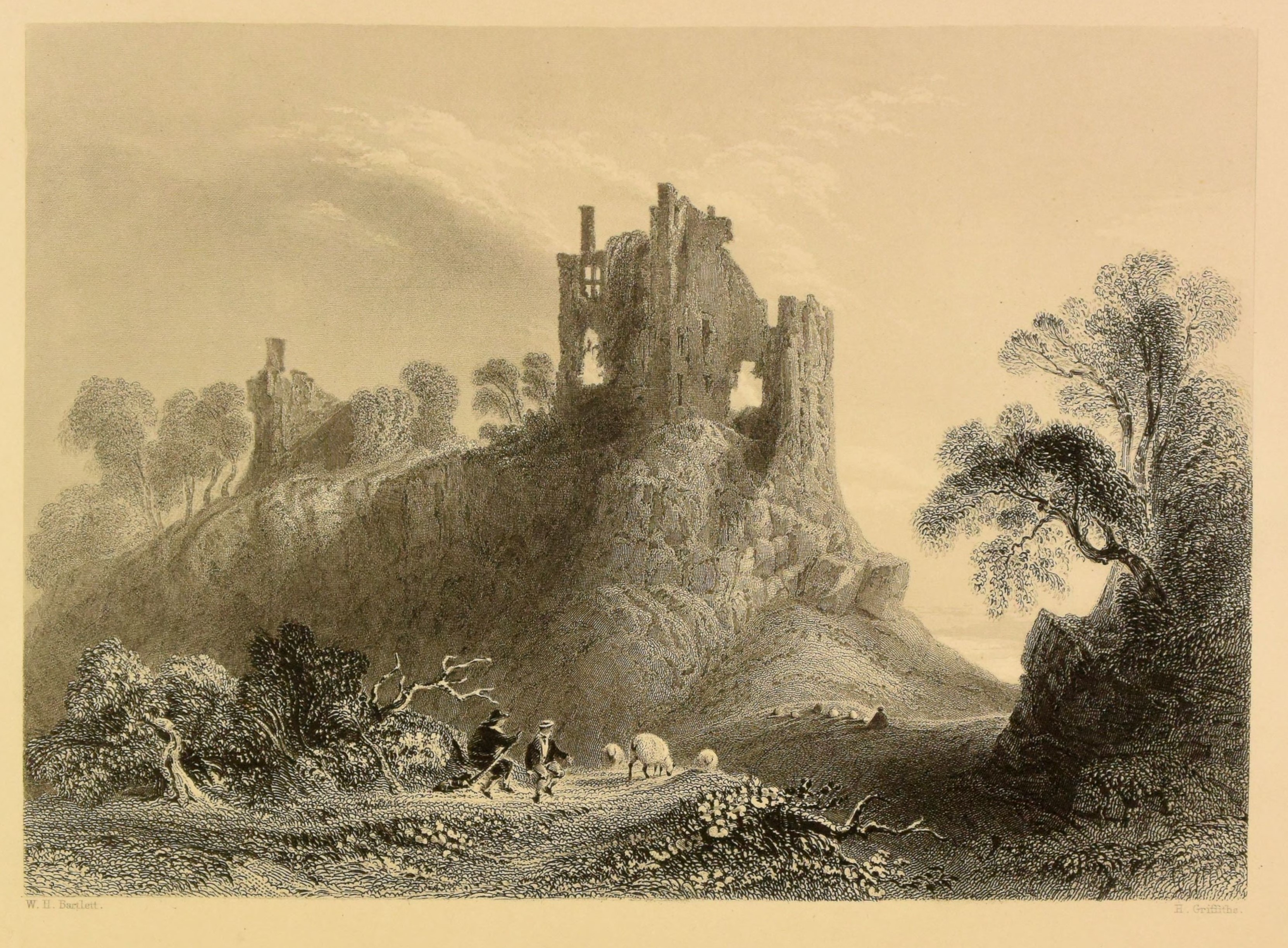
Plate from The scenery and antiquities of Ireland of 1842

The castle and or area, as "Carraic Ui gConaing" are referred to in the Annals of Innisfallen (1209) as being confirmed by King John to Donchad Cairbreach O'Brien, King of Thormond, an ally of the English king's Norman interests.

Since at least the late medieval period the name has been associated with Irish Gaelic for "rock of the candle" (see § Legends.) In Henry VIII's reign it was recorded as "Carekogunyel". It was recorded on maps as "Carrig Gunning" (Hardiman map collection, c.1570-80); as "Carykgonyn" on Mercator's Atlases published by Hondius of 1606 and 1636; during the same period, on John Speed's map and other English maps as "Cargonin" or "Cargonian". The name "Carrigogunnel" has been recorded as early as 1536.

Antiquaries have also assumed a derivation of the name from a local ancient tribe, the Ui Chonail Gabhra (see also Uí Fidgenti), though there is a lack of references showing that they actually controlled the land the castle is situated on. Westropp 1907 suggests that Carrigogunnel and Castleconnell to the east both derive from the name of the historic tribe, the Ui Chonaing. The etymology and name Carrig-O-Gloinneal, meaning Rock of the O’Connells has also been suggested.

== History ==
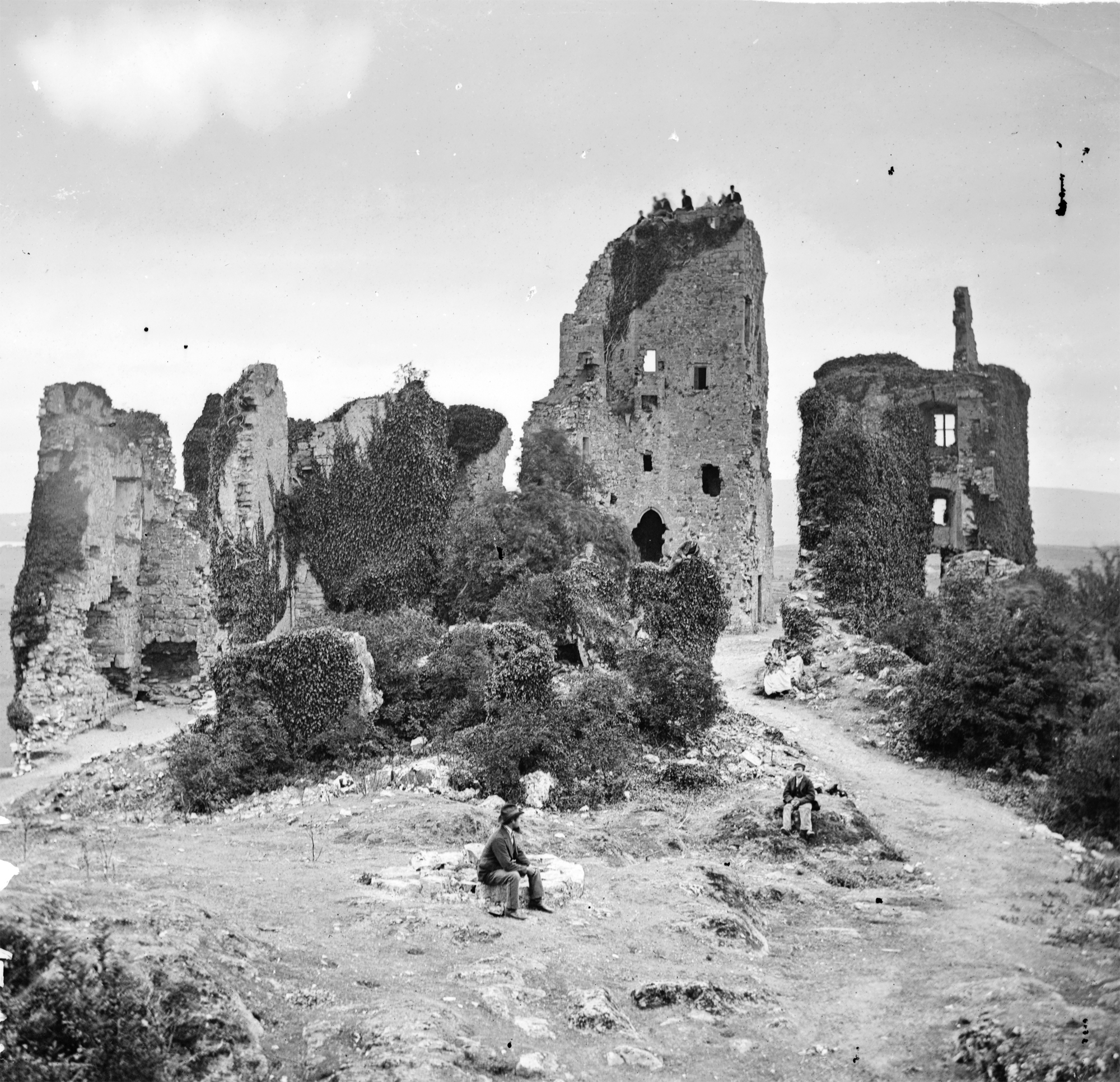
Castle ruins seen in an old stereograph photo from the National Library of Ireland collection, ca. 1860. (view north from outer bailey)

The castle is first named in 1209, when Carrac Ui Conaing was granted to Donnchad Cairbreach, King of Thomond. Other unsubstantiated stories tell it being built for or garrisoned by Templars. No record remains for over a century; then a branch of the O'Briens seems to have crossed the Shannon, settled there, and overspread the old Norman Manor of Esclon, and southward, up the Maigue, their territory being represented by the barony and name of Pubblebrian; this is said to have been about 1336, but their chief's ancestor of the later Briens of Carrigogunnell, Tadhg na Glenore (O'Brien), was King of Thomond in 1426, and it seems doubtful whether his descendants obtained the place and built the castle much before 1450. The castle first appears in history in 1536; Leonard Grey, 1st Viscount Grane, the Lord Deputy, marched to "the very strong castle called Carekogunyel, and in English Candell Rock… It stands on a high rock and .... is the key of all the county."

According to "Limerick; Its History and Antiquities, .." by Maurice Lenihan the other occupants of the castle were the O'Connell Family, who surrendered it to the Fitzgeralds.

The owner, Mahon "Mat" O'Byrne, surrendered it on condition that the Government should hold it themselves. State pledges were broken as easily then as now. Grey was about to give it to one Donoth O'Bryne, ignoring his promise, when by a plot of Edmond Sexton and his wife (as their enemies alleged, but Grey acquitted them) it was put back into the hands of "Matthew's" warder; it was then attacked, and one of its towers was taken on the night of 22 August; the keep surrendered next morning, and Edmond Cahill, the warder, and all its garrison were brought to Limerick, tried and hanged. The Crown claimed the castle, apparently on the unfounded statement that the O'Briens held from "Lord Clerre", probably Richard de Clare, whose lands had reverted to the Crown. Donough was established in it, but he abused his powers and was deprived for extortion. Mahon used to claim a penny for each barrel of wine, and 2 pence for every other barrel brought to Limerick. Donough's son, Brian Duff, was confirmed in it and in nearly all the present Pubblebrian.

The castle was not used in Wars of the Three Kingdoms (1640-1651). A Captain Wilson took it over and built a stable there after it was prudently sold by its last owner, Donough Brien, to Michael Boyle (afterwards Archbishop of Dublin). It then had a castle, bawn, a few thatched huts, and a salmon fishery.

During the second siege of Limerick of the Williamite War in Ireland, the castle was occupied by a force of 150 men for King James II. In August 1691 the Dutch general Godert de Ginckell sent Lieutenant-General Scravemore with a strong party, and four guns, to take the castle. The garrison surrendered, and were marched to Clonmel as prisoners of war. Shortly after, in September 1691, de Ginckell ordered Carrigogunnell slighted and it was blown up.

=== Carrigogunnell massacre ===
Leonard Grey, 1st Viscount Grane was implicated in several massacres in Ireland; the most notorious took place at Carrigogunnell Castle in 1536 (then part of Thomond, it would later become part of County Limerick in the Kingdom of Ireland). As an active participant in the Tudor conquest of Ireland, he was one of the figures who brought a new element to Irish warfare, where the killing of non-combatants by Crown forces was seen as acceptable by the establishment.

The killings went beyond usual practice in Ireland; as Grey noted in his own account, there were women and children among those he had killed. It is the very fact that he included this information in his report to London, deeming it a piece of service fit to be recorded, that pinpoints his significance in the military history of sixteenth-century Ireland. Traditionally, Irish warlords only rejoiced in the killing of soldiers, and passed over the killing of non-combatants in silence. Grey (and other English officers of the time) saw all killing as virtuous, an achievement worthy of commemoration.

— David Edwards, Age of Atrocity: Violence and Political Conflict in Early Modern Ireland, 2010.

== Legends ==
A tradition has been recorded that before the construction of the castle the rock at Carrigogunnel was the abode of a Hag, 'Grana', "Gigantic in size, and frightful in appearance"; according to the legend she would light an enchanted candle every night on the peak, and a person who looked at it that night would be dead before sunrise the next day.

In one version of the story this curse of the hag was lifted by one Regan (one of Finn's men), with the aid of a magic cap gifted by the magician Luno of Lochlin - the story tells how a large erratic stone in the area, known as the Clough-a-Regaun (or Cloghregan), was thrown by the hag at the escaping hero of the tale, Regan. According to the 19th century recorder of the tale, Thomas Crofton Croker, the name Carrigogunnel has its origins in the same story - meaning "rock of the candle". (Note: The Gaelic for rock and candle are creag and coinneal respectively.) Variations of the story attribute the deed to Saint Patrick.

== See also ==
- Castle Connell, a castle on the east side of Limerick.
- Charles Johnstone (1719-1800), writer, born in Carrig-o-gunnel
