= R513 road (Ireland) =

Road in County Cork and County Limerick, Ireland

Coordinates: 52.456664°N 8.425170°W

R513 road
- Bóthar R513
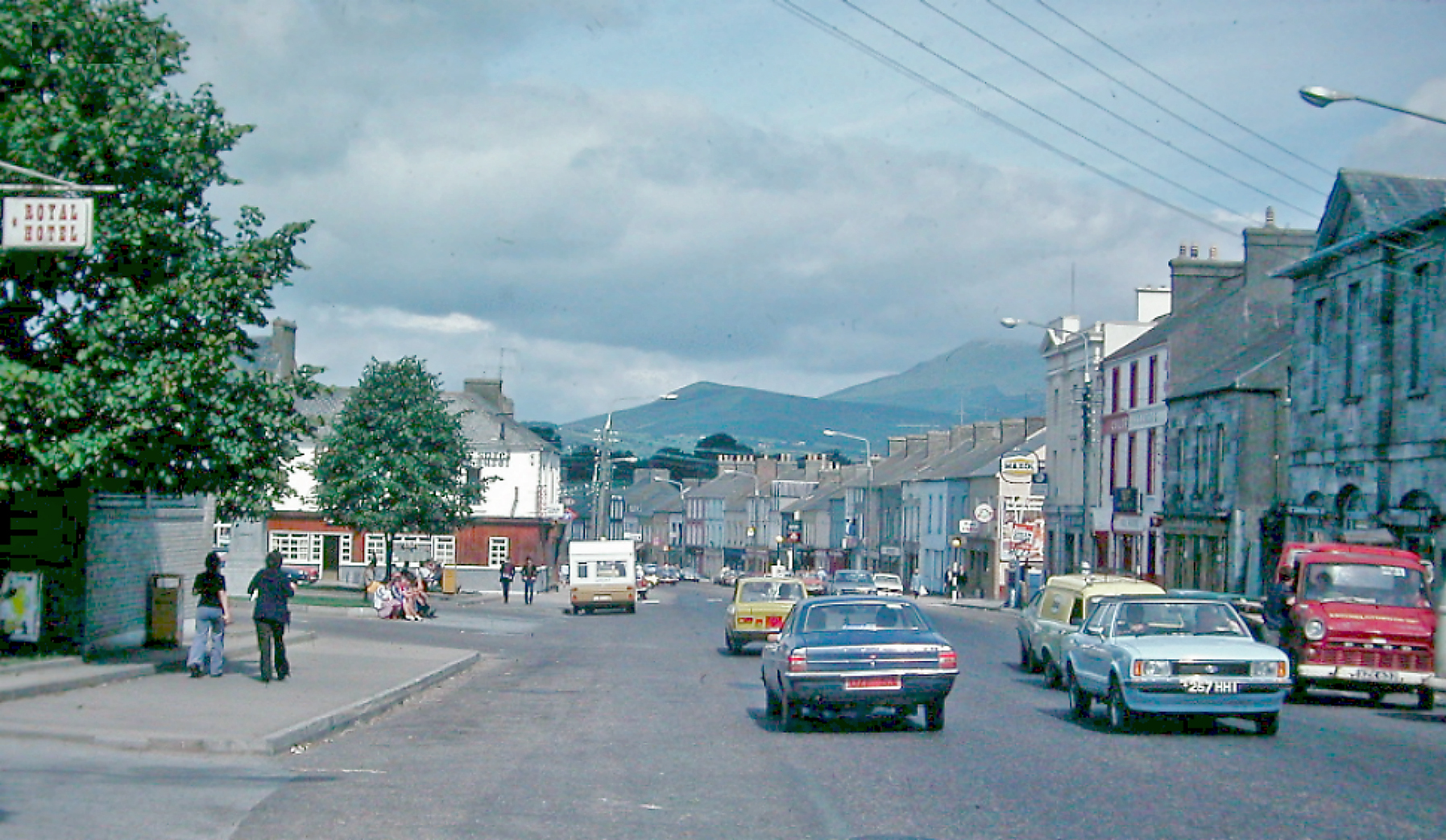
- Mitchelstown's Upper Cork Street, part of the R513

Route information
- Length: 44.6 km (27.7 mi)

Major junctions
- From: N24 Ballyvarra/Sandylane
- Passes through Caherconlish; R514 Herbertstown; R516 Hospital; R515 Knocklong; R663 Garryspillane (Pinker's Cross); Passes through Ballylanders; R662 Ballyfauskeen; Crosses Aherlow River; Crosses River Funshion and enters County Cork; R665 Mitchelstown (Cork Street)
- To: R639 Cloonlough Roundabout

Location
- Country: Ireland

Highway system
- Roads in Ireland; Motorways; Primary; Secondary; Regional
← R512	→ R514

The R513 road is a regional road in County Cork and County Limerick, Ireland.

It was formerly the trunk road T50.
