= River Maigue =

River in counties Cork and Limerick, Ireland, flowing to the Shannon Estuary

Coordinates: 52°39′N 8°48′W

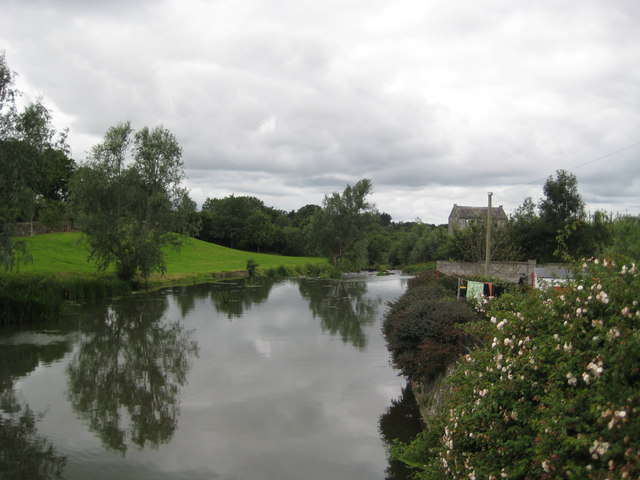
- River Maigue, Bruree
- Etymology: Irish mag, "plain"
- Native name: An Mháigh (Irish)

Location
- Country: Ireland
- Cities: Bruree, Croom, Adare

Physical characteristics
- Mouth
  - location: Shannon Estuary, County Limerick
- Length: 62.36 km (38.75 mi)
- Basin size: 1,000 km^{2} (390 sq mi)
- Discharge
  - average: 15.6 m^{3}/s (550 cu ft/s)

The River Maigue (locally /ˈmæɡ/, Irish: An Mháigh, meaning '[river of] the plain') rises in the Milford area of north County Cork, Ireland, and discharges into the Shannon Estuary. It is 62.36 kilometres (38.75 mi) long,, and drains an area of 1,000 square kilometres (390 sq mi).

It is joined by the small River Glen and the larger River Loobagh in south County Limerick. It then flows north through Bruree, after which it augmented by the River Morning Star. It flows through Croom and Adare before entering the Shannon Estuary (Irish: An tSionainn) just north of Ferry Bridge between Kildimo and Clarina, just west of Limerick city. The River Maigue is tidal up to Adare on the N21 Road Bridge.

== History ==
In ancient times the Maigue was central to the territories of the O'Donovans and their predecessors in Uí Chairpre Áebda (Cairbre Eva). The majority of its towns and villages were once the sites of fortresses. Later these territories were occupied by the FitzGerald dynasty.

The beautiful slow song in Irish, ‘Slán le Máigh’, was written by Aindrias Mac Craith, a poet from the local area who lived in the 18th century. The song is still widely sung and is also played as a slow air.

== Tributaries ==
=== River Loobagh ===
The Loobagh (Irish: An Lúbach, meaning 'The Twisted One') is a river with healthy Trout and Salmon populations. It rises in the hills south of Kilfinane and flows through Kilmallock. It joins the Maigue south of Bruree.

=== Morning Star River ===
The Morning Star is a little river which flows westwards through rich farmland through Bruff and Athlacca to join the Maigue north of Bruree. Its name derives from the Irish Camhaoir, lit. 'daybreak', a corruption of the original name, Samhaoir. This is a name of unknown etymology also once used for the River Erne; it may be an Indo-European hydronym (cf. the many European rivers named Samara).

=== Camogue River ===
The River Camogue flows in a westerly direction through Grange, Meanus and Manister and joins the Maigue upstream of Croom.

== See also ==
- Rivers of Ireland
