= Michael Collins Birthplace =

Birthplace of Irish revolutionary Michael Collins

- Áit Bhreithe Mhícheál Uí Choileáin
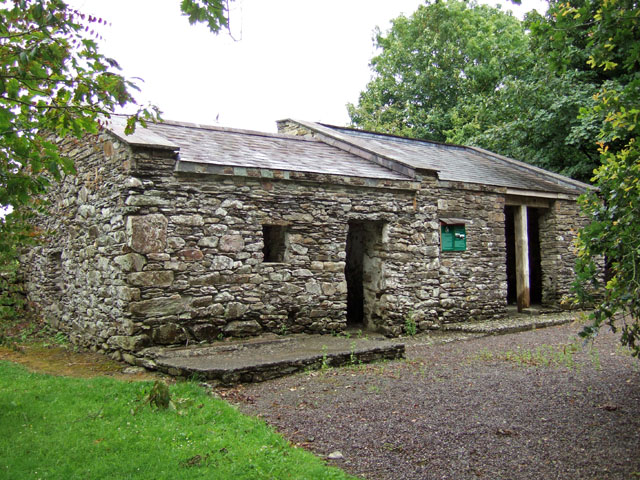

- Location within Ireland

General information
- Status: Museum
- Type: cottage
- Architectural style: Vernacular
- Location: Woodfield, Kilkerranmore, Coolcraheen, near Clonakilty, Ireland
- Coordinates: 51.616650°N 8.980448°W
- Elevation: 65 m (213 ft)
- Construction started: mid-19th century
- Renovated: 1989–90
- Owner: Office of Public Works

Technical details
- Material: Stone, timber, slate
- Floor count: 1

Design and construction
- Designations

National monument of Ireland
- Official name: Michael Collins birth place
- Reference no.: 634

The Michael Collins Birthplace is a cottage and National Monument located in Kilkerranmore, County Cork, Ireland. It was the birthplace of Irish revolutionary leader Michael Collins (1890–1922).

== Location ==
The Michael Collins Birthplace is located 8 km (5 mi) east of Rosscarbery, immediately northwest of the hamlet of Sam's Cross.

== History ==
Collins was born in Woodfield, Coolcraheen, near Clonakilty, in 1890 without medical assistance to Mary Anne Collins (née O'Brien; c. 1852–1907).

In 1900, three years after the death of Michael John Collins (1815-1897), Mary Anne's much older husband, the family moved to a new house on the farmstead, and the old house became housing for livestock. Almost the entire property, then occupied by Collins's widower brother, Seán (previously known as John), and his eight children, was burned down at the direction of Essex Regiment soldiers on 7 April 1921.

The land was sold two years later, in 1923. It was rebuilt many years later, but the original house his mother built was left as is after it was burnt, with only the buildings imprint and one chimney stack standing. It opened to the public in October 1990 by President Patrick Hillery and is maintained by the Office of Public Works.

== Description ==
The house is rectangular and single-storey, built of local stone. Michael John Collins, father of Michael, was an adept carpenter and made the furniture, doors and windowframes himself.

== See also ==
- De Valera's Cottage
