= Hospital, County Limerick =

Village in County Limerick, Ireland

Hospital Irish: An tOspidéal
- Village
- Location in Ireland
- Coordinates: 52°28′25″N 8°25′55″W
- Country: Ireland
- Province: Munster
- County: County Limerick

Population (2022)
  - Total: 674
- Time zone: UTC+0 (WET)
  - Summer (DST): UTC-1 (IST (WEST))
- Irish Grid Reference: R703356

Hospital (Irish: An tOspidéal or Ospidéal Ghleann Áine) is a village in east County Limerick, Ireland. It is also a civil parish in the ancient barony of Smallcounty. The village's population was 674 in the 2022 census. The village itself is situated in the townland of Barrysfarm, one of 11 in the civil parish. It lies on the River Mahore, a tributary of the River Camogue.

== Name ==
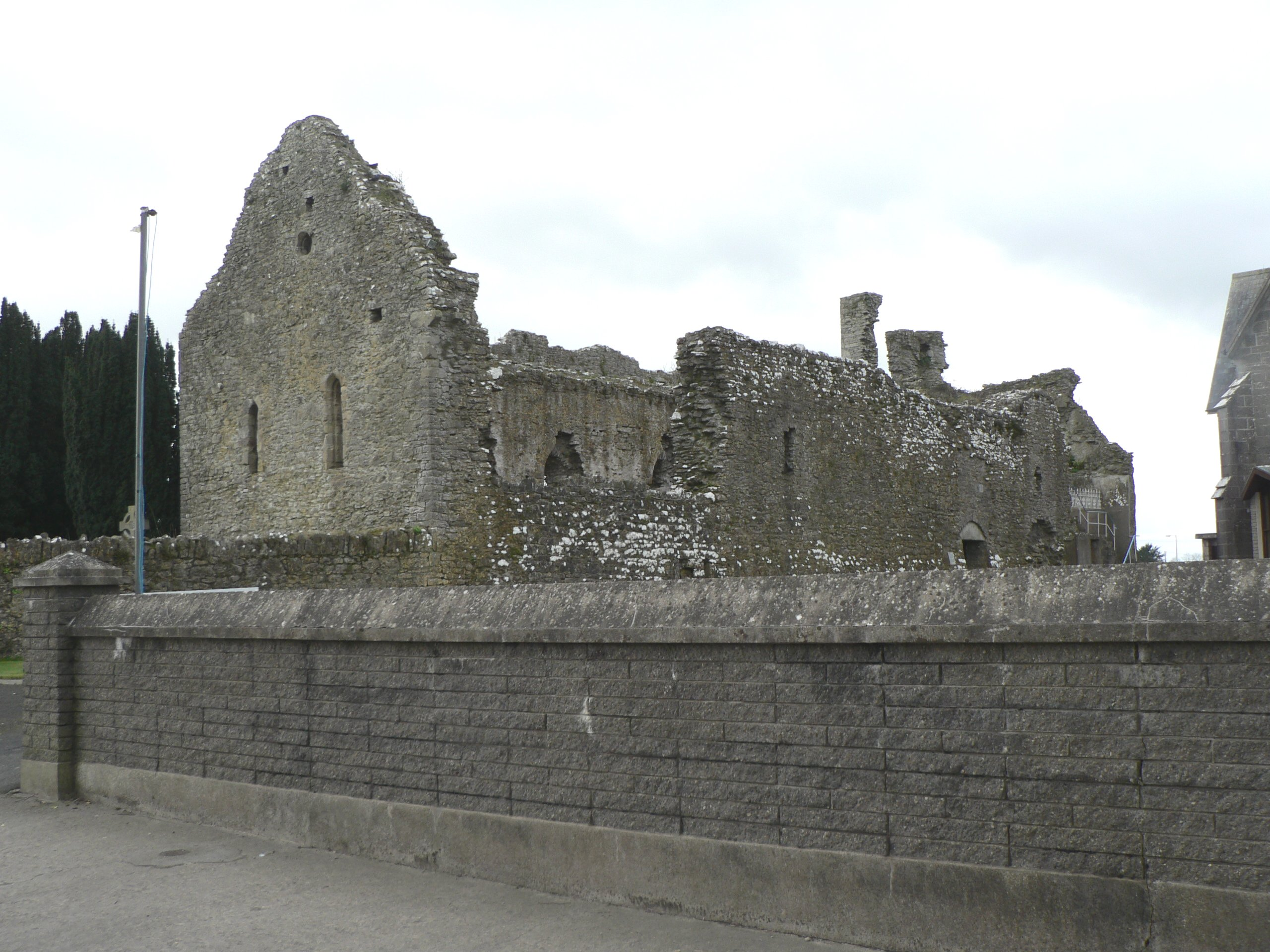
Hospital Church

The village acquired its name from the crusading Knights Hospitaller who built the archaeologically significant Hospital Church here before 1215. This church has the remains of three tombs, dating from the 13th and 14th centuries.

An alternative explanation, from the biography of Sir Valentine Browne, Surveyor General of Ireland (who was awarded lands in the area by Queen Elizabeth I of England), is that the village formed part of the parish of Aney in ancient times, and derived its name from a hospital for Knights Templar, founded in 1226 by Geoffry de Marisco, then Lord Justice of Ireland.

== Transport ==
The "Old Cork Road" from Limerick to Mitchelstown and Cork (also known today as the R513 road) passes through the village.

== Amenities ==
The village's secondary school was completed in 2000 and had around 1,000 students in 2018. There is also a primary school which was completed in the summer of 2004. Hospital is also home to one of Limerick's Youthreach schools.

Hospital had six public houses in 2017, but this had reduced to four by July 2022.

The village shares a Gaelic Athletic Association (GAA) club (Hospital-Herbertstown GAA) with the village of Herbertstown.

Hospital association football team was founded in 1881 by Sir P.J. Butler. Formerly known as Hospital Crusaders, today it is called Kilfrush Crusaders. Other recreational bodies include the local tennis and handball clubs.

Hospital also has an active Family Resource Centre on Knockainey Road.

There is a stone circle nearby at Ballinamona.

The village celebrated the 800th anniversary of its foundation in 2015.

== Development ==
In 2006, Limerick County Council published a local area development plan for Hospital which laid out plans and proposals for the future expansion of the village.

== Notable people ==
- Roger Utlagh (c.1260–1341), cleric and statesman
- Jon Kenny (1957-2024), comedian and actor
- Jimmy Carroll (b.1957), Limerick inter-county hurler
- Damien Reale (b. 1981), Limerick inter-county hurler
- Liam Reale (b. 1983), athlete
- George Cecil Bennett (1877-1963), TD for Limerick 1927-1948 and Senator 1948–1951. resident at Rathaney House (now demolished)

== See also ==
- List of towns and villages in Ireland
