= Pallasgreen =

Village in County Limerick, Ireland

Pallasgreen Irish: Pailís Ghréine
- Village
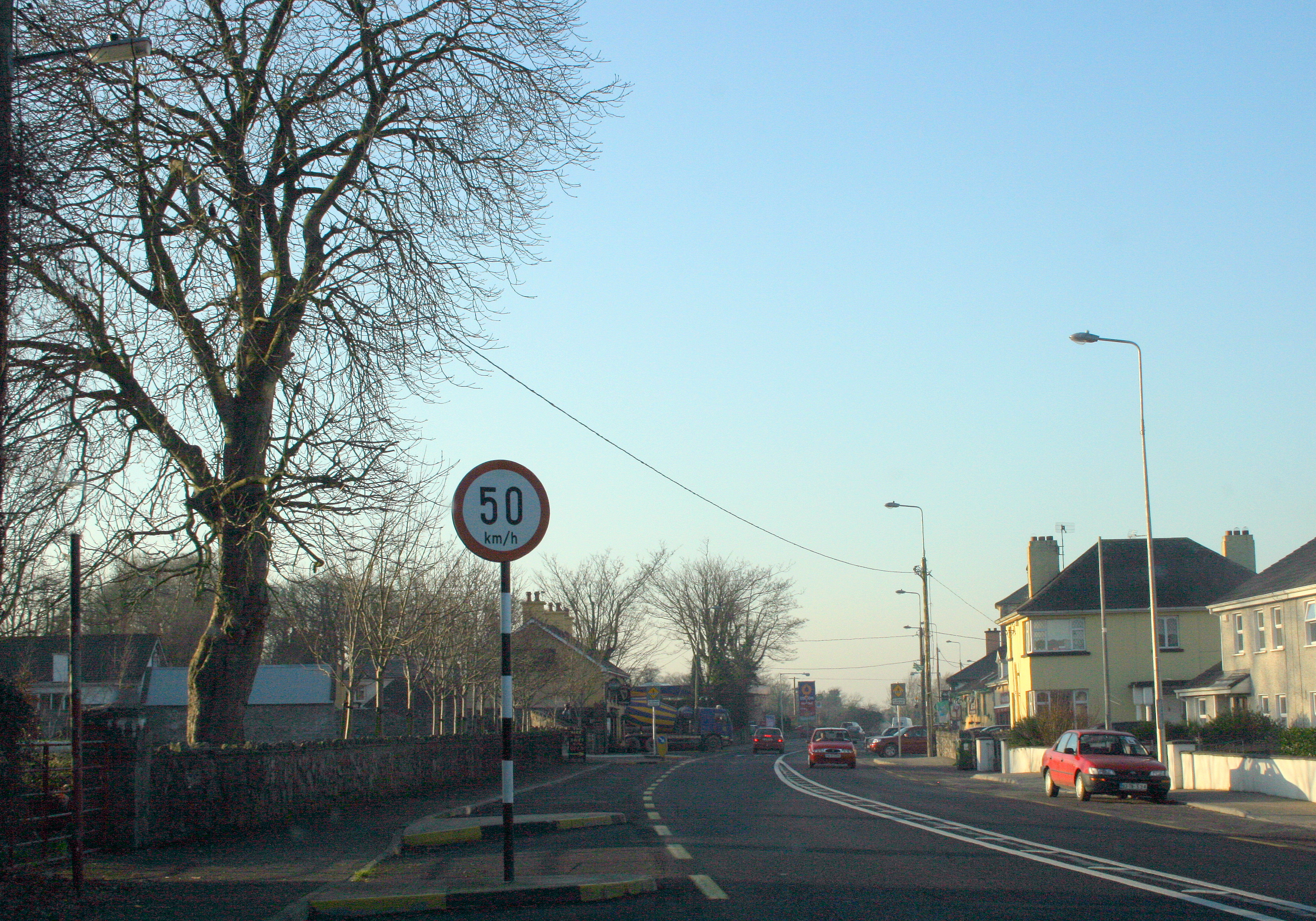
- Pallasgreen, County Limerick

- Location in Ireland
- Coordinates: 52°33′03″N 8°20′19″W
- Country: Ireland
- Province: Munster
- County: County Limerick

Population (2022)
  - Total: 229
- Time zone: UTC+0 (WET)
  - Summer (DST): UTC-1 (IST (WEST))
- Irish Grid Reference: R757440

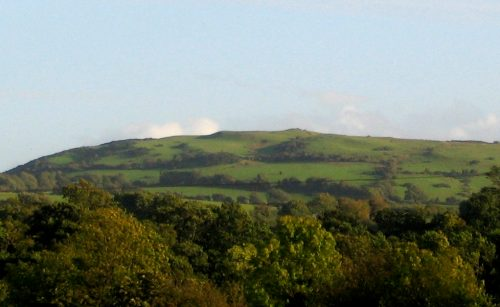
Nicker Hill, mythological home of the ancient Irish Goddess of Love, and highest of a local group of volcanic hills that extend into Kilteely-Dromkeen

Pallasgreen or Pallasgrean (Irish: Pailís Ghréine, meaning 'stockade of Grian') is a village in east County Limerick, Ireland. It is on the Limerick–Waterford N24 road, around 20 kilometres (12 mi) southeast of Limerick city. The name means "the Stockade of Grian," referring to an ancient Irish Goddess of Love, who is associated with the nearby hill of Nicker.

Approximately 2 km south of Pallasgreen is the related village, Old Pallas, and roughly three miles south of Pallasgreen is Sarsfield's Rock, a large rocky outcrop near the church of Templebraden. This rocky outcrop looks down on the site where Patrick Sarsfield destroyed the Williamite artillery during the Jacobite-Williamite War. The rock itself has views of the surrounding hills and fields.

Irish American hammer thrower, Patrick Ryan was born at Old Pallas near Pallasgreen in 1881.

The village of Pallasgreen is served by a service station, a butcher, a post office, an insurance broker, four pubs, two mechanics, a Chinese takeaway, a chipper, two hairdressers, and a sit-down/takeaway restaurant.

The Pallasgreen Gaelic Athletic Association club play in the colours of blue and gold, identical to the colours of County Tipperary, whose border is just six miles away. The parish of Pallasgreen and Templebraden also has connections with this bordering county as it is one of a number of parishes in east County Limerick which form part of the Roman Catholic Archdiocese of Cashel and Emly. The parish had originally been part of the ancient diocese of Emly until it joined with Cashel in 1718.

Public transportation is provided by Bus Éireann and the local company, Kelly Travel.

== See also ==
- List of towns and villages in Ireland
