= Bruff =

Town in County Limerick, Ireland

Bruff An Brú
- Town
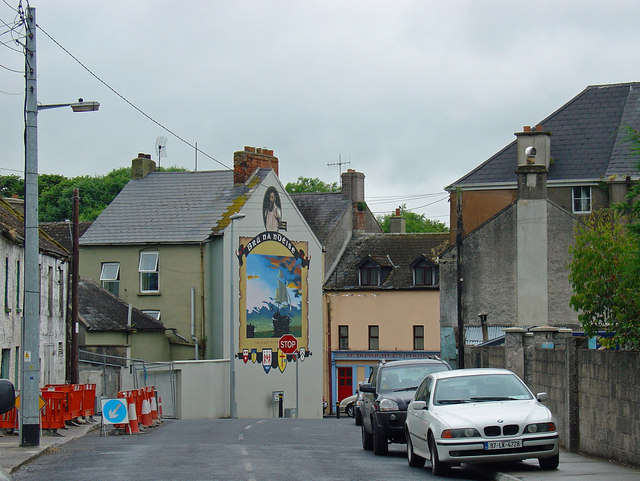
- Mural on Crawford's Street depicting the Flight of the Earls

- Location in Ireland
- Coordinates: 52°28′37″N 8°33′00″W
- Country: Ireland
- Province: Munster
- County: County Limerick

Population (2016)
  - Total: 803
- Time zone: UTC+0 (WET)
  - Summer (DST): UTC-1 (IST (WEST))
- Irish Grid Reference: R647369

Bruff (Irish: An Brú) is a town in east County Limerick, in the midwest of Ireland, located on the old Limerick–Cork road (R512). The town lies on the Morning Star river, with two bridges in the town itself. The horseshoe lake of Lough Gur is nearby. The town is in a townland and civil parish of the same name.

== Name ==
The town's official name in Irish is An Brú, historically written as Brugh. Older spellings in English, dating from 1200 onward, include Brun, Bruun, Bruin, Brugh, Browe, and Broff, Brown, Braun, Braff, Bruno, Bruneau, and An Bru’ because of its close association with the Anglo-Norman De Lacy family. The town's name was also rendered in Irish as Brú an Léisigh; it is believed that a modern name for the town, Brú na nDéise, is a corruption of this name that was popularised from the early 1900s on.

== History ==
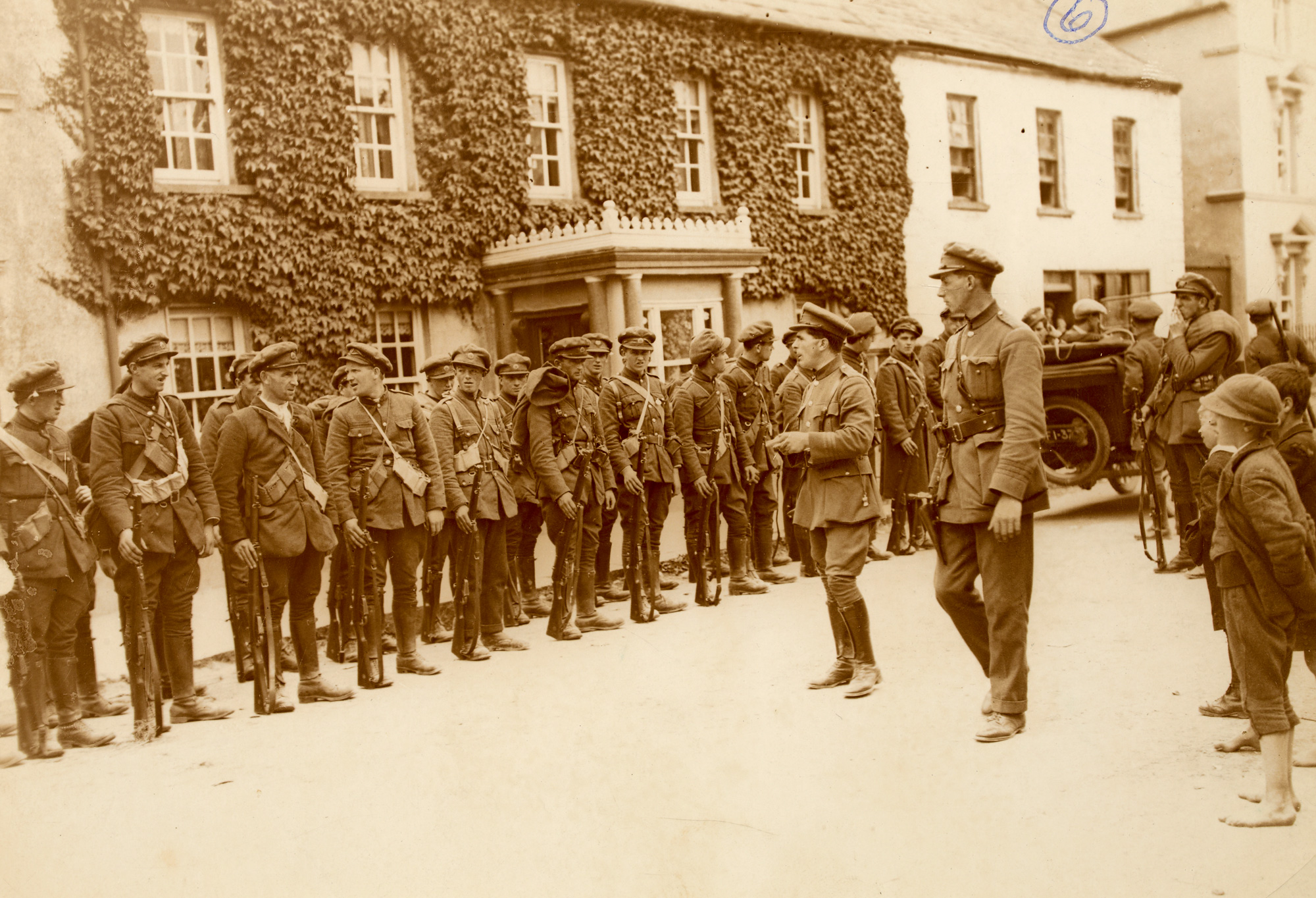
Roll call of troops of the National Army prior to the advance on Kilmallock (around 25–29 July 1922)

Historical artefacts found around the area date back to the Stone Age, with various buildings up to the early Christian era still extant. In the sixteenth century, Bruff was granted to the Standish family, from whom it passed by inheritance to the Hartstonge Baronets, and ultimately to the Earl of Limerick.

The town was the site of heavy fighting in the Battle of Killmallock during the Irish Civil War. Near the Catholic Church, there is a large statue of Sean Wall, commander of the East Limerick Irish Republican Army and chairman of Limerick County Council until his death on 6 May 1921 during the War of Independence.

The former seat of the O'Grady family, Kilballyowen, is near Bruff. Bruff is also the hometown of the American missionary and bishop John Joseph Hogan (1829–1913).

The US President John F. Kennedy was a descendant of the Fitzgeralds of Bruff. His daughter, Caroline Kennedy, visited the town in 2013.

== Sport ==
The town has Gaelic Athletic Association (GAA), Pitch & Putt, hockey, soccer, and rugby union clubs.

The rugby club, Bruff R.F.C., is the home club of John Hayes, the Ireland rugby union international. The GAA club, Bruff GAA, won the Limerick Intermediate Hurling Championship in 2014. Bruff is also home to Limerick F.C.'s Kirby O'Sullivan Sports, Social and Business Park.

== Development and economy ==
Bruff town has been classified as a satellite town of Limerick City. Expansion plans for the town were laid out in the development plan published by Limerick County Council in 2012.

Ard Scoil Mhuire, the only secondary school in the town, has been closed down, its former campus is now home to the Kirby O'Sullivan Sports, Social and Business Park. There are several pubs, restaurants, shops, a pharmacy and a post office in the town.

== Tourism ==
Bruff's Cultural and Arts Society organises an Annual Summer Festival, an event held annually since its inception in 2006. It includes the Morning Star Rose Competition and the Morning Star Escort Competition (since 2008). The Sean Wall Committee organise a "Bloomsday in Bruff" festival every year on 16 June. A number of murals have been painted on the walls of buildings in the town.

Accommodation in the town is provided in what used to be the old AIB Bank, known as "The Old Bank", which had also served as the Garda station in the town.

== People ==
- James David Bourchier (1850–1920), journalist, Balkans correspondent of The Times
- Paul Browne (b. 1989), hurler
- George Clancy (1881–1921), Mayor of Limerick
- George Clancy (b. 1977), international rugby union referee.
- John Crimmin (1859–1945), Victoria Cross recipient
- Marie Curtin (b. 1985), Republic of Ireland women's international footballer
- Seán Finn (b. 1996), hurler
- Anthony O'Riordan (b. 1966), hurler

== See also ==
- List of towns and villages in Ireland
