= Athlacca =

Village in County Limerick, Ireland

Athlacca An tÁth Leacach
- Village
- Location in Ireland
- Coordinates: 52°27′28″N 8°39′5″W
- Country: Ireland
- Province: Munster
- County: County Limerick
- Dáil Éireann: Limerick County
- Eircode routing key: V35
- Dialling code: 063

Athlacca (historically Athlacka, from Irish: an tÁth Leacach, meaning 'the ford of the flagstones') is a small village in County Limerick, in the south west of Ireland. It is situated 26 km south of Limerick City, on the Morningstar River. The name Athlacca means 'ford of the flagstones', a feature that was once evident under the current St Catherine's Bridge. In the 17th century, the parishes of Dromin and Athlacca amalgamated and became one, and now the parish goes by the name Dromin/Athlacca.

There are two pubs in the village, a national school, a playschool and Catholic church. Whilst the Catholic church remains in permanent use, the old Church of Ireland church has been demolished and all that remains is the steeple and gable wall. Athlacca parish extends from Rathcannon in the south to Crean in the north.

Athlacca is in a rural area where farming, although in decline, is still the biggest employer.

Athlacca most famous parishioners are Jim Cregan, the former European athletics champion, and PP Hogan (deceased 2005), champion horse trainer. The local GAA club is Dromin/Athlacca the club plays hurling and Gaelic football, the club colours are blue and white. The club won the 2013 County Intermediate Hurling Championship beating Knockaderry in the final and as of 2014 were competing at the Premier Intermediate grade. The underage joined up with neighboring parish Banogue in 2008 and formed a new club 'Shamrock Gaels' while in 2016 they changed their name to 'Dromin Athlacca Banogue'. Horse racing also has a following in the area and a point-to-point meeting is held annually.

The sheltered housing known as "Dawn Court" was built on the grounds of the old creamery. It was opened by the then President of Ireland, Mary McAleese. The only part of the old creamery left is the chimney staff. Separate to the developments 20 dwellings, there is a sculpture of a high chair (or King's chair) made of green marble; on top of the chair is the scull and antlers of a red deer - in honour of the giant elk that was found in Rathcannon at the turn of the 20th century.

== See also ==
- List of towns and villages in Ireland
