= R512 road (Ireland) =

Road in Ireland

R512 road
- Bóthar R512
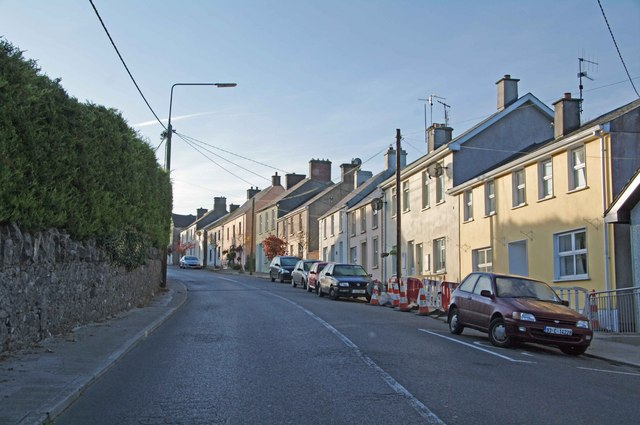
- Kildorrery, County Cork, on the R512

Location
- Country: Ireland

Highway system
- Roads in Ireland; Motorways; Primary; Secondary; Regional

The R512 road is a regional road in Ireland which runs from Limerick city to Fermoy, County Cork. At one time it was part of the main route between the cities of Limerick and Cork.

From Limerick city the R512 starts at the Kilmallock Roundabout, passes over the M7 motorway (there is no junction), and proceeds generally southwards through Bruff and Kilmallock to finally join the N72 road just outside Fermoy.

== See also ==
- Roads in Ireland
- National primary road
- National secondary road
