= County Limerick =

County in mid-western Ireland

Coordinates: 52°30′N 8°45′W

County Limerick Contae Luimnigh
- County
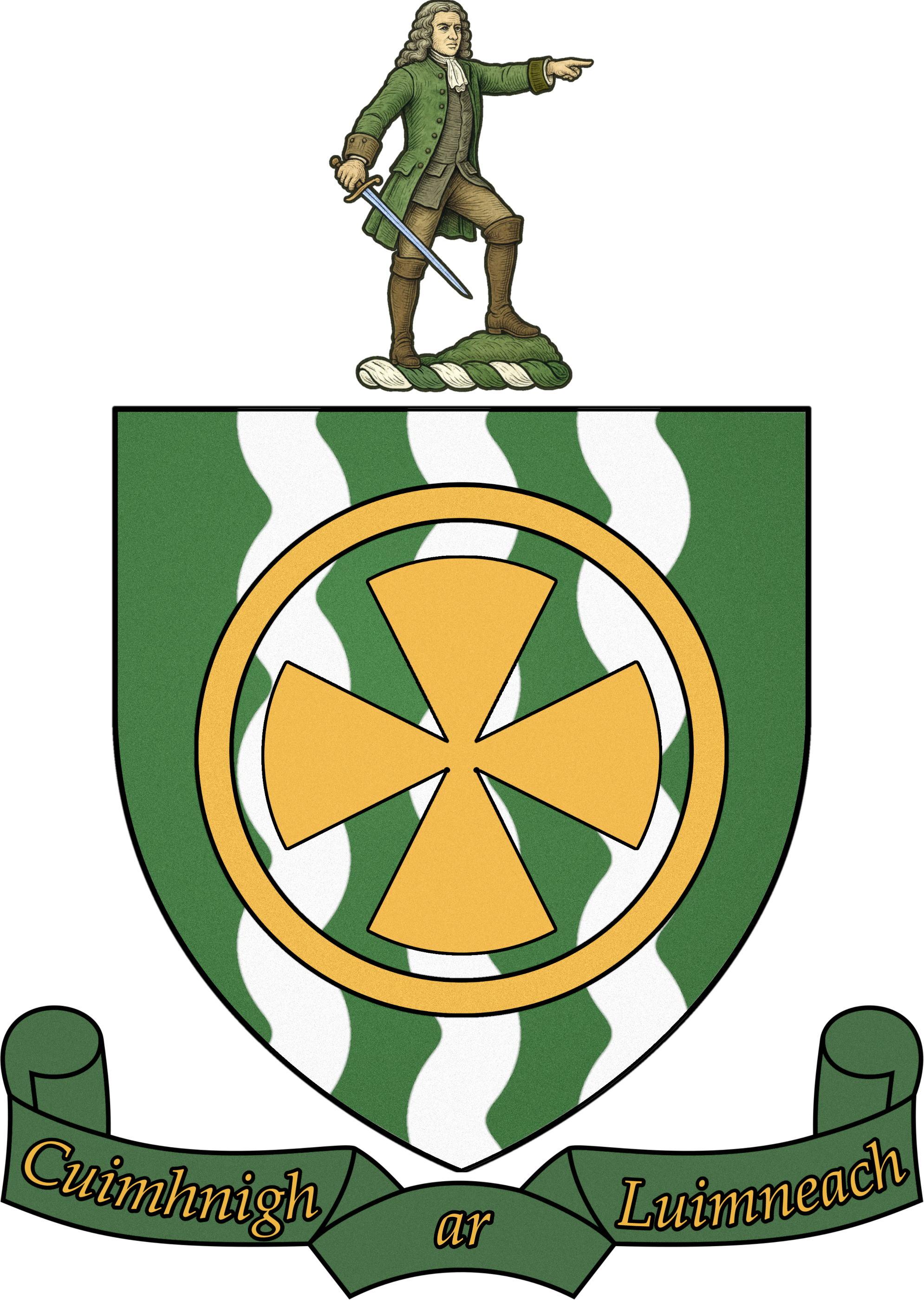
- Coat of arms
- Nicknames: The Treaty County, Shannonside
- Motto: Irish: Cuimhnigh ar Luimneach "Remember Limerick"
- Interactive map of County Limerick
- Country: Ireland
- Province: Munster
- Region: Southern (Mid-West)
- Established: 1210
- County town: Limerick and Newcastle West

Government
  - Local authority: Limerick City and County Council
  - Dáil constituencies: Limerick City and Limerick County
  - EP constituency: South

Area
  - Total: 2,756 km^{2} (1,064 sq mi)
  - Rank: 10th
- Highest elevation (Galtymore): 918 m (3,012 ft)

Population (2022)
  - Total: 209,536
  - Rank: 9th
  - Density: 76.03/km^{2} (196.9/sq mi)
- Demonym(s): Limerickman, Shannonsider, Treatyman
- Time zone: UTC±0 (WET)
  - Summer (DST): UTC+1 (IST)
- Eircode routing keys: V35, V42, V94 (primarily)
- Telephone area codes: 061, 069 (primarily)
- ISO 3166 code: IE-LK
- Vehicle index mark code: L (since 2014); LK (1987–2013)
- Website: Official website

County Limerick (Irish: Contae Luimnigh) is a western county in Ireland. It is in the province of Munster and is located in the Mid-West which comprises part of the Southern Region. It is named after the city of Limerick. Limerick City and County Council is the local council for the county. The county's population at the 2022 census was 209,536 of whom 102,287 lived in Limerick City, the county capital.

== Geography ==
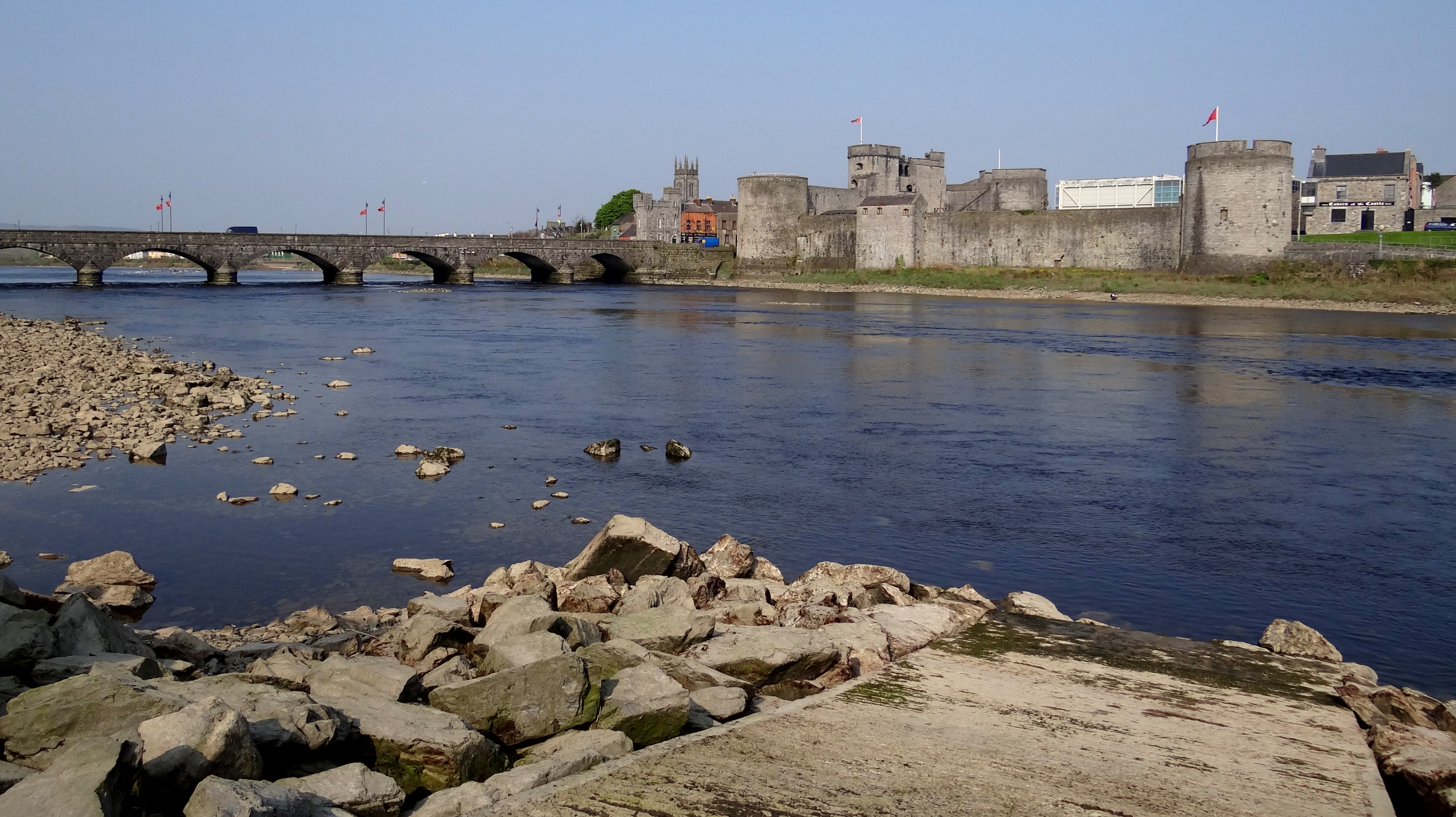
The River Shannon runs through Limerick City, with King John's Castle.

Limerick borders four other counties: Kerry to the west, Clare to the north, Tipperary to the east, and Cork to the south. It is the fifth-largest of Munster's six counties in size and the second-largest by population. The River Shannon flows through the city of Limerick, then continues as the Shannon Estuary until it meets the Atlantic Ocean past the far western end of the county. Because the estuary is shallow, the county's most important port is several kilometres west of the city, at Foynes. Limerick City is the county town and is also Ireland's third-largest city. Newcastle West, Kilmallock and Abbeyfeale are other important towns in the county.

=== Baronies ===
There are fourteen historic baronies in the county. While baronies continue to be officially defined units, they are no longer used for many administrative purposes. Their official status is illustrated by Placenames Orders made since 2003, where official Irish names of baronies are listed under "Administrative units".

- Clanwilliam – Clann Liam
- Connello Lower – Conallaigh Íochtaracha
- Connello Upper – Conallaigh Uachtaracha
- Coonagh – Uí Chuanach
- Coshlea – Cois Laoi
- Coshma – Cois Máighe
- Glenquin – Gleann an Choim
- Kenry – Caonraí
- Kilmallock – Cill Mocheallóg
- North Liberties – Na Líbeartaí Thuaidh
- Owneybeg – Uaithne Beag
- Pubblebrien – Pobal Bhriain
- Shanid – Seanaid
- Smallcounty – An Déis Bheag

== Most populous towns ==
All settlements with a population over 1,000 people are listed below, Limerick City is the county town and is shown in bold.

Rank	Change since 2016	Town	Population (Census 2022)	Change since 2016
1	**0**	**Limerick**	102,287	+1.4%
2	**0**	Newcastle West	7,209	+1.4%
3	**0**	Annacotty	3,398	+2.5%
4	**0**	Castleconnell	2,488	+2.8%
5	**0**	Abbeyfeale	2,206	+1.5%
6	**0**	Kilmallock	1,761	+0.9%
7	**0**	Caherconlish	1,569	+1.0%
8	▲**1**	Murroe	1,432	+0.7%
9	▲**1**	Croom	1,240	+1.1%
10	▼**2**	Rathkeale	1,231	-7.0%
11	**0**	Askeaton	1,236	+1.4%
12	**0**	Adare	1,224	+1.4%

== Physical geography ==
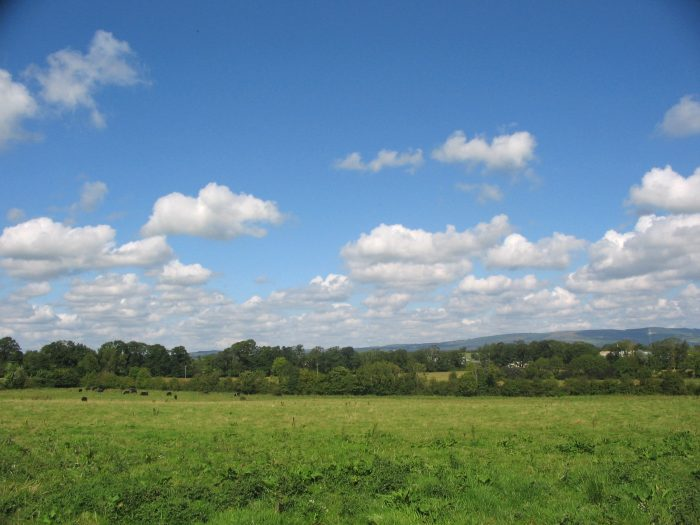
Typical east Limerick landscape, part of the Golden Vale

One possible meaning for the county's name in Irish Luimneach is "the flat area"; this description is accurate as the land consists mostly of a fertile limestone plain. Moreover, the county is ringed by mountains: the Slieve Felims to the northeast, the Galtees to the southeast, the Ballyhoura Mountains to the south, and the Mullaghareirk Mountains to the southwest and west. The highest point in the county is located in its southeast corner at Galtymore (919 m), which separates Limerick from County Tipperary. Limerick shares the 3rd-highest county peak in Ireland with Tipperary. The county is not simply a plain, its topography consists of hills and ridges. The eastern part of the county is part of the Golden Vale, which is well known for dairy produce and consists of rolling low hills. This gives way to very flat land around the centre of the county, with the exception being Knockfierna at 288 m high. Towards the west, the Mullaghareirk Mountains (Mullach an Radhairc in Irish, roughly meaning "mountains of the view") push across the county offering extensive views east over the county and west into County Kerry.

Volcanic rock is to be found in numerous areas in the county, at Carrigogunnell, at Knockfierna, and principally at Pallasgreen/Kilteely in the east, which has been described as the most compact and, for its size, one of the most varied and complete carboniferous volcanic districts in either Britain and Ireland.

Tributaries of the Shannon drainage basin located in the county include the rivers Mulcair, Loobagh, Maigue, Camogue, Morning Star, Deel, and the Feale.

== History ==
It is thought that humans had established themselves in the Lough Gur area of the county as early as 3000 BC, while megalithic remains found at Duntryleague date back further to 3500 BC. The arrival of the Celts around 400 BC brought about the division of the county into petty kingdoms or túatha.

From the 4th to the 11th century, the ancient kingdom of the Uí Fidgenti was approximately co-extensive with what is now County Limerick, with some of the easternmost part the domain of the Eóganacht Áine. The establishment of Limerick as a town and base by the Danes in the mid 900's, and their alliance with Irish families, including their alliance with Donnubán mac Cathail of the O'Donovans, resulted in significant conflicts with neighbouring clans, principally the O'Briens of Dál gCais, who raided into the Limerick area on a regular basis. The O'Briens retained their political power until late in the 1100s. The establishment of King John's Castle in Limerick, and the granting of formerly Ui Fidgenti lands to the FitzGeralds, both circa 1200, and the resultant competition for Ui Fidgenti lands by other Anglo-Norman families resulted in a transfer of power from the Ui Fidgenti's leading families (O'Donovan and Collins) to the new landholders. The ancestors of both Michael Collins and the famous O'Connells of Derrynane were also among the septs of the Uí Fidgenti.

As the Ui Fidgenti were the ruling clan in Limerick after 400 a.d., the Uí Fidgenti still made a substantial contribution to the population of the central and western regions of County Limerick. Their capital was Dún Eochair, the great earthworks of which still remain and can be found close to the modern town of Bruree, on the River Maigue. Bruree is a derivation of Brugh Righ, or Fort of the King. Catherine Coll, the mother of Éamon de Valera, was a native of Bruree and this is where he was taken by her brother to be raised.

St. Patrick brought Christianity to Limerick area in the 5th century. Various annals record that St. Patrick quarrelled with the chief of the Ui Fidgenti (who, though hosting St. Patrick, had his horses stolen as he journeyed into their territory) but was embraced by the brother of the chief. The adoption of Christianity resulted in the establishment of important monasteries in Limerick, at Ardpatrick, Mungret and Kileedy. From this golden age in Ireland of learning and art (5th – 9th Centuries) comes one of Ireland's greatest artefacts, The Ardagh Chalice, a masterpiece of metalwork, which was found in a west Limerick fort in 1868. It is believed that the chalice had been taken by raiding Danes during the 9th century, ending up in the territory of their Irish allies, the O'Donovans of the Ui Fidgenti.

Following the establishment of the Ui Fidgenti circa 377 a.d., there were few significant changes in political control until the arrival of the Vikings in the 9th century, which ultimately brought about the establishment of the city on an island on the River Shannon in 922. The death of Domnall Mór Ua Briain, King of Munster in 1194 resulted in the invading Normans taking control of Limerick. In 1210, the County of Limerick was formally established as Ui Fidgenti lands were granted to what would become the Fitzgerald dynasty. Over time, the Normans became "more Irish than the Irish themselves" as the saying goes. The Tudors in England wanted to curb the power of these Gaelicised Norman Rulers and centralise all power in their hands, so they established colonies of English in the county. Distrust by England of the leading Fitzgerald families, and the execution of several of the Fitzgeralds of Kildare, precipitated a revolt against English Rule in 1569. Th resultant savage war in Munster, known as the Desmond Rebellions, laid waste to the province and ended with confiscation of the vast estates of the Geraldines and other Irish families that had participated in the ten years of war.

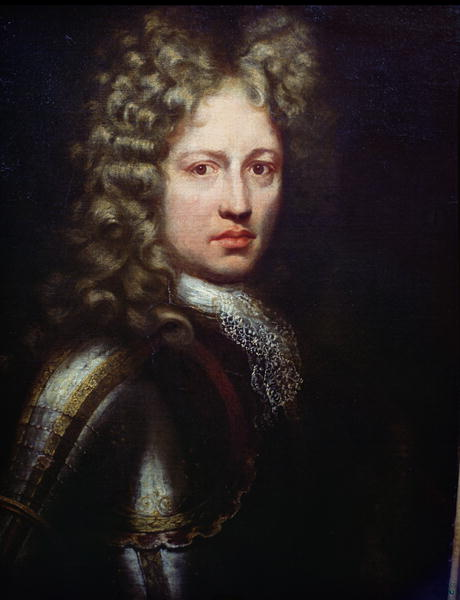
Patrick Sarsfield the prominent Jacobite general, features on the Limerick coat of arms.

The county was to be further ravaged by war over the next century. After the Irish Rebellion of 1641, Limerick city was taken in a siege by Catholic general Garret Barry in 1642. The county was not fought over for most of the Irish Confederate Wars, of 1641–53, being safely behind the front lines of the Catholic Confederate Ireland. However, it became a battleground during the Cromwellian conquest of Ireland in 1649–53. The invasion of the forces of Oliver Cromwell in the 1650s included a twelve-month siege of the city by Cromwell's New Model Army led by Henry Ireton. The city finally surrendered in October 1651. One of Cromwell's generals, Hardress Waller was granted lands at Castletown near Kilcornan in County Limerick. During the Williamite War in Ireland (1689–1691) the city was to endure two further sieges, one in 1690 and another in 1691. It was during the 1690 siege that the infamous destruction of the Williamite guns at Ballyneety, near Pallasgreen was carried out by General Patrick Sarsfield. The Catholic Irish, comprising the vast majority of the population, had eagerly supported the Jacobite cause, however, the second siege of Limerick resulted in a defeat to the Williamites. Sarsfield managed to force the Williamites to sign the Treaty of Limerick, the terms of which were satisfactory to the Irish. However, the Treaty was subsequently dishonoured by the English and the city became known as the City of the Broken Treaty.

The 18th and 19th centuries saw a long period of persecution against the Catholic majority, many of whom lived in poverty. In spite of this oppression, however, the famous Maigue Poets strove to keep alive their ancient Gaelic Poetry in towns like Croom and Bruree. The Great Famine of the 1840s set in motion mass emigration and a huge decline in Irish as a spoken language in the county. This began to change around the beginning of the 20th century, as changes in law from the British Government enabled the farmers of the county to purchase lands they had previously only held as tenants, paying high rent to absentee landlords.

Limerick saw much fighting during the War of Independence of 1919 to 1921 particularly in the east of the county. The subsequent Irish Civil War saw bitter fighting between the newly established Irish Free State soldiers and IRA "Irregulars", especially in the city (See Irish Free State offensive).

== Local government and politics ==
The island of Ireland, showing location of County Limerick.

=== Local government ===
The local government area of Limerick City and County is under the jurisdiction of Limerick City and County Council. The council has responsibility for local services such as sanitation, planning and development, libraries, collection of motor taxation, local roads and social housing in the city. The council comprises elected councillors with an appointed full-time CEO as both city and county manager. Until June 2014 the county was divided into two separate local government areas, administered by separate authorities: Limerick City Council and Limerick County Council. In October 2012 the Government of Ireland published Putting People First: Action Programme for Effective Local Government which set out Government policy for reforms across all the main areas of local government in Ireland. Among the recommendations was the merging of the city and the county of Limerick into a single local government area. The Local Government Reform Act 2014 implemented this change, which came into effect on 1 June 2014. This change saw a reduction in five in the total number of councillors representing the city and county.

=== Councillors ===
The current local electoral areas are:

- Adare-Rathkeale (6 seats)
- Cappamore-Kilmallock (7 seats)
- Limerick City East (7 seats)
- Limerick City North (7 seats)
- Limerick City West (7 seats)
- Newcastle West (6 seats)

The three city LEAs form the Metropolitan District of Limerick City. Each of the other LEAs forms its own municipal district.

=== Constituencies ===
The county is part of the South constituency for European elections. For elections to Dáil Éireann, the county is part of two constituencies: Limerick City (4 seats), and Limerick County (3 seats).

== Irish language ==
There are 2,322 Irish speakers in County Limerick attending the six gaelscoileanna (Irish language primary schools) and three gaelcholáistí (Irish language secondary schools).

== Culture ==
In 2014, Limerick became Ireland's inaugural National City of Culture, with a wide variety of artistic and cultural events occurring at various locations around the city. The Limerick City Gallery of Art on Pery Square is the city's chief venue for contemporary art exhibitions. Theatres include the Limetree Theatre, Mary I; the University Concert Hall and the Millennium Theatre, LIT all in the city. Others include the Friar's Gate in Kilmallock and the Honey Fitz in Lough Gur. The city has an active music scene, which has produced bands such as The Cranberries. The Limerick Art Gallery, the Limerick School of Art and Design, and Ormston House cater for painting, sculpture and performance art of all styles.

Limerick is also home to comedians The Rubberbandits, D'Unbelievables (Pat Shortt and Jon Kenny) and Karl Spain. Its most famous acting son is Richard Harris. The city is the setting for Frank McCourt's memoir Angela's Ashes and the film adaptation. A limerick is a type of humorous verse of five lines with an AABBA rhyme scheme: the poem's connection with the city is obscure, but the name is generally taken to be a reference to Limerick city or County Limerick, sometimes particularly to the Maigue Poets who were based in Croom and its environs, and may derive from an earlier form of nonsense verse parlour game that traditionally included a refrain that included "Will [or won't] you come (up) to Limerick?" Riverfest is an annual summer festival held in Limerick. The festival was begun in 2004. Other festivals include the Knights of Westfest in Newcastle West, Fleadh by the Feale in Abbeyfeale and the Ballyhoura International Walking Festival. The west of the county is known for its Irish music, song and dance and is part of the Sliabh Luachra area of traditional Irish music along the borders of County Cork and County Kerry.

== Places of interest ==
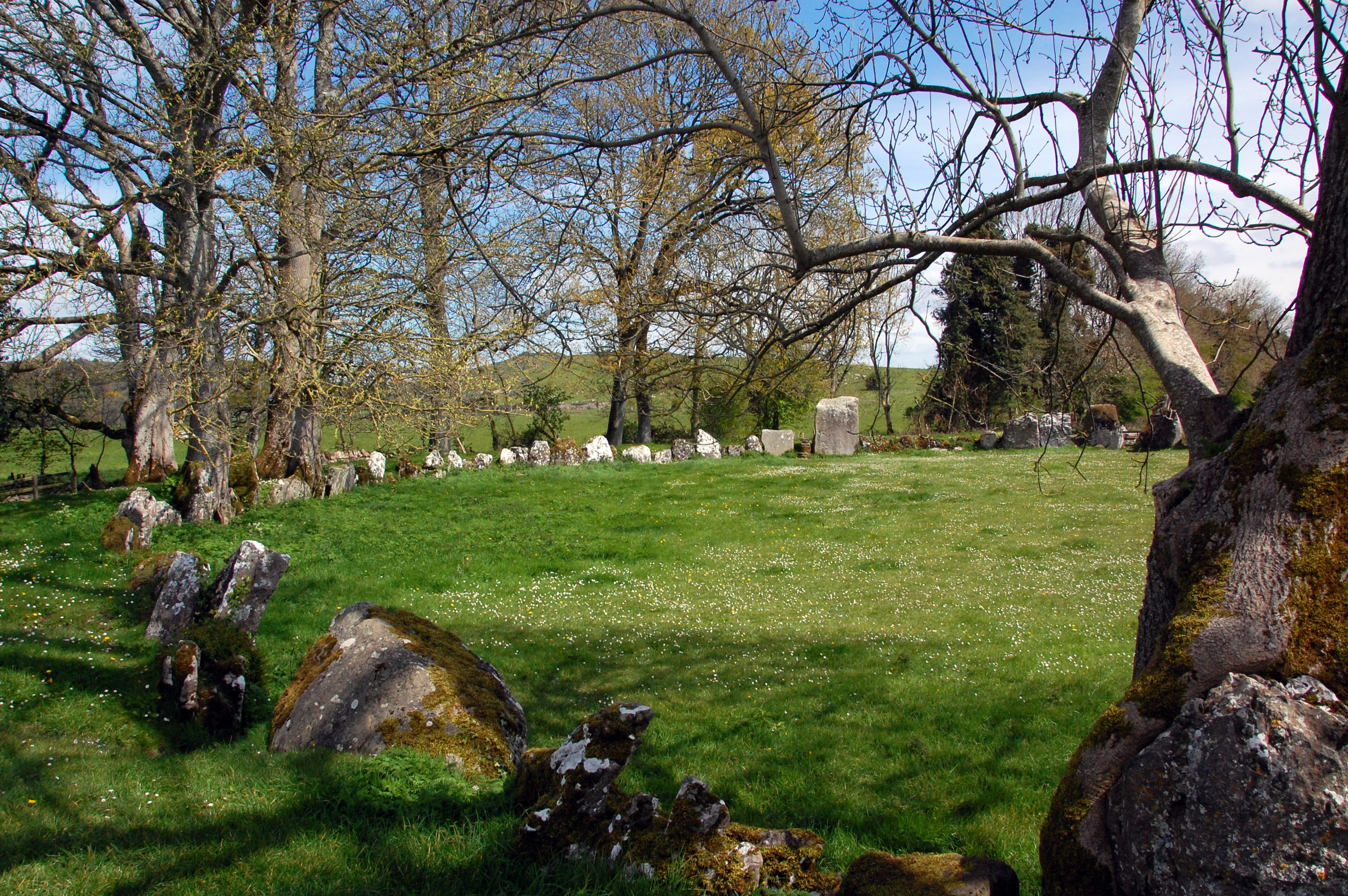
Grange Stone Circle is the largest stone circle in Ireland.

Lough Gur is one of Ireland's most important archaeological sites.

- Adare
- Adare Manor
- Castle Oliver
- Clare Glens
- Croom Castle
- Curraghchase Forest Park
- Foynes Flying Boat Museum
- Glenstal Abbey
- Glin-Estuary Drive
- Glin Castle
- Grange Stone Circle
- Hunt Museum
- King John's Castle
- Limerick City Museum
- Lough Gur
- The Treaty Stone

== Transport ==
=== Rail ===
The main railway station in Limerick is Colbert station, named after West Limerick man Con Colbert who was executed following the Easter Rising of 1916. Limerick has three operational railway lines passing through it,

- the Limerick–Ballybrophy railway line leading to North Tipperary stopping at Castleconnell, Birdhill, Nenagh Cloughjordan and Roscrea
- the Ennis line through County Clare which continues on to Galway as part of the Western Railway Corridor
- the Limerick Junction line which is the busiest line, connecting Limerick to the Cork–Dublin Heuston line and to the Limerick Junction–Clonmel–Waterford line.

In addition, a line exists leading to Foynes however the last revenue service was in 2000.

=== Road & bus ===
The M7 is the main road linking Limerick with Dublin. The M/N20 connects the county with Cork. The N21 road links Limerick with Tralee and travels through some of the main county towns such as Adare, Rathkeale, Newcastle West and Abbeyfeale. The N/M18 road links the county to Ennis and Galway while the N24 continues southeastwards from Limerick towards Waterford travelling through villages such as Pallasgreen and Oola. The R513 is a spur road off the N24 and links up with the villages of Caherconlish, Hospital and Ballylanders before continuing on to Mitchelstown. The N69, a secondary route travels from Limerick City along the Shannon Estuary through Clarina, Kildimo, Askeaton, Foynes & Glin and continues towards Listowel in County Kerry. It is the main road linking the Port of Foynes with Limerick city, although plans are in place to upgrade this road to motorway status. The county's regional/national bus hub is located beside Colbert Station and connects most parts of the city and county.

=== Air ===
Although, no commercial airports are situated in County Limerick, the region's needs are serviced from Shannon Airport situated 25 km over the border in County Clare which has many flights to Europe and North America. However, some in the south of the county may also use Kerry Airport and Cork Airport which are also within 1 hour's drive. Coonagh Aerodrome located just outside the city close to the Clare border is used for light pleasure craft. Foynes, a village in the west of the county, had a unique part to play in the development of aviation. During the late 1930s and early 1940s, land-based planes lacked sufficient flying range for Atlantic crossings. Foynes was the last port of call on its eastern shore for seaplanes. As a result, Foynes would become one of the biggest civilian airports in Europe during World War II. Surveying flights for flying boat operations were made by Charles Lindbergh in 1933 and a terminal was begun in 1935. The first transatlantic proving flights were operated on 5 July 1937 with a Pan Am Sikorsky S-42 service from Botwood, Newfoundland and Labrador on the Bay of Exploits and a BOAC Short Empire service from Foynes with successful transits of twelve and fifteen-and-a-quarter hours respectively. Services to New York, Southampton, Montreal, Poole and Lisbon followed, the first non-stop New York service operating on 22 June 1942 in 25 hours 40 minutes. All of this changed following the construction and opening in 1942 of Shannon Airport on flat bogland on the northern bank of the Estuary. Foynes flying-boat station closed in 1946.

=== Sea ===
Originally Limerick port was located near the confluence of the Abbey and Shannon rivers at King's Island. Today the port is located further downstream on the Shannon alongside the Dock Road and is operated by the Shannon Foynes Port Company (SFPC) who operate all marine activities in the Shannon estuary. It is a general-purpose facility port. Plans to close the port and relocate all activity to the deepwater facility further downstream at Foynes have been abandoned. The plans included a major regeneration of the dockland area. Foynes is the main deepwater commercial port. SFPC is the second largest port facility in Ireland, handling over 10 million tonnes of cargo annually through the six terminals currently operational.

== Sport ==
Rugby union is popular in the county. Some of Ireland's most celebrated teams are situated in the city; Garryowen, Shannon, Old Crescent, Young Munster and UL Bohemians. Bruff RFC, another AIL team, are located near the village of Bruff in the south of the county. Thomond Park is the home of the Munster Rugby team, who enjoy enthusiastic support throughout the county.

Gaelic Athletic Association (GAA) games are more popular in the parts outside of the city. Hurling is popular in east, mid and south Limerick. Limerick GAA board plays its home games at the Gaelic Grounds in the city. The county hurling team has won the All-Ireland Senior Hurling Championship twelve times, the last in 2023. The county has also won 20 Munster Championships, last in 2019 and 12 National Hurling Leagues, the last success coming in 2019. The Limerick Senior Hurling Championship is also one of the strongest club championships in the country. Historically it has been dominated by two clubs, Ahane and Patrickswell. Clubs from the county have won the Munster Senior Club Championship six times, with Na Piarsaigh becoming the first team from the county to win the All-Ireland Senior Club hurling final when they beat Cushendall of Antrim 2–25 to 2–14 on 17 March 2016.

The other GAA sport of Gaelic football is more popular in west Limerick, particularly along the Shannon Estuary west of Askeaton and along the Kerry border. There are also football strongholds in the southeast of the county and on the eastern edges of the city. Although one of the strongest teams in the country during the early years of the GAA, the game in the county was overshadowed by hurling throughout the 20th century and its last success in the All-Ireland Senior Football Championship, was in 1896. However, Limerick footballers have seen a reversal of fortunes in recent years and contested successive Munster Senior Football Championship finals in 2003 and 2004.

Treaty United play in the FAI First Division, the second tier of Irish soccer. The club has won the Premier Division twice in 1960 and 1980. They have also won the FAI Cup twice in 1971 and 1982. They currently play in the Markets Field.

The city also has one of Ireland's two 50-metre (55 yd) swimming pools, at the University of Limerick Sports Arena, as well as one of Ireland's top basketball teams, the UL Eagles. The team plays in the Irish Premier League. Their home is also at the University Campus.

Limerick is also the hometown of WBO World Middleweight boxing Champion Andy Lee, who defeated Matt Korobov on 13 December 2014, in Las Vegas. He became the first Irishman to win a world title on American soil since 1934.

== Media ==
=== Broadcasting ===
RTÉ Lyric FM, a state-run classical music radio station and part of RTÉ, broadcasts nationally from studios in Limerick city centre. Limerick's local radio station is Live 95FM, broadcasting from 'Radio House', near the waterfront at Steamboat Quay. Spin Southwest, owned by Communicorp, broadcasts to Counties Kerry, Clare, Limerick, Tipperary and southwest Laois from its studios at Landmark Buildings in the Raheen Industrial Estate. West Limerick 102 is broadcast from Newcastle West and is a community station for the west of the county. The national broadcaster, RTÉ, has radio studios in the city, which are periodically used to broadcast programming from Limerick.

=== Print ===
The two main newspapers that service the city and county are the Limerick Leader and the freesheet Limerick Post. The Limerick Leader prints three different editions: City, County and West Limerick. The Limerick Chronicle is owned by the Limerick Leader and is primarily a city paper. The Weekly Observer serves the western half of the county while the Vale Star covers South Limerick and North Cork.

== Anthem ==
The song "Limerick You're a Lady" is traditionally associated with the county. It is sometimes heard at sports fixtures involving the county. "Seán South from Garryowen" is another popular Limerick song which tells the account of the death of Limerick IRA member Sean South, who was killed during an attack on a Royal Ulster Constabulary barracks in County Fermanagh in 1957.

== See also ==
- List of abbeys and priories in County Limerick
- High Sheriff of County Limerick
- High Sheriff of Limerick City
- Wild Atlantic Way
