= East Limerick (UK Parliament constituency) =

Former UK Parliament constituency in Ireland

- Former county constituency for the House of Commons

1885–1922
- Seats: 1
- Created from: County Limerick
- Replaced by: Limerick City–Limerick East

East Limerick was a UK Parliament constituency in Ireland, returning one Member of Parliament from 1885 to 1922.

Prior to the 1885 United Kingdom general election the area was part of the County Limerick constituency. From 1922 it was not represented in the UK Parliament, with the establishment of the Irish Free State on 6 December 1922.

== Boundaries ==
This constituency comprised the eastern part of County Limerick.

1885–1922: The baronies of Clanwilliam, Coonagh, Coshlea, Kilmallock, Owneybeg, Pubblebrien and Smallcounty, and that part of the barony of Coshma not contained within the constituency of West Limerick.

== Members of Parliament ==
| Date | Name | Party | Born | Died | Age |
|---|---|---|---|---|---|
| Dec 1885 | John Finucane | Nationalist (Note: Anti-Parnellite Nationalist from 1891.) | 1843 | 23 Mar 1902 | 58 |
| 2 Oct 1900 | William Lundon | Nationalist | 1839 | 24 Mar 1909 | 69 |
| 10 Jun 1909 | Thomas Lundon | Nationalist | 21 Jun 1883 | 28 Oct 1951 | 68 |
| 14 Dec 1918 | Richard Hayes | Sinn Féin | 1882 | 16 June 1958 | 75/76 |

== Elections ==
=== Elections in the 1880s ===
1885 general election: East Limerick
| Party | Candidate | Votes | % | ±% |
|---|---|---|---|---|
| Irish Parliamentary | John Finucane | Unopposed | | |
| Irish Parliamentary win (new seat) | | | | |

1886 general election: East Limerick
| Party | Candidate | Votes | % | ±% |
|---|---|---|---|---|
| Irish Parliamentary | John Finucane | Unopposed | | |
| Irish Parliamentary hold | | | | |

=== Elections in the 1890s ===
1892 general election: East Limerick
| Party | Candidate | Votes | % | ±% |
|---|---|---|---|---|
| Irish National Federation | John Finucane | 2,903 | 71.2 | N/A |
| Irish National League | William Loonan | 1,174 | 28.8 | N/A |
| Majority | | 1,729 | 42.4 | N/A |
| Turnout | | 4,077 | 50.1 | N/A |
| Registered electors | | 8,144 | | |
| Irish National Federation gain from Irish Parliamentary | | Swing | N/A | |

1895 general election: East Limerick
| Party | Candidate | Votes | % | ±% |
|---|---|---|---|---|
| Irish National Federation | John Finucane | Unopposed | | |
| Irish National Federation hold | | | | |

=== Elections in the 1900s ===
1900 general election: East Limerick
| Party | Candidate | Votes | % | ±% |
|---|---|---|---|---|
| Irish Parliamentary | William Lundon | Unopposed | | |
| Irish Parliamentary hold | | | | |

1906 general election: East Limerick
| Party | Candidate | Votes | % | ±% |
|---|---|---|---|---|
| Irish Parliamentary | William Lundon | Unopposed | | |
| Irish Parliamentary hold | | | | |

By-election 1909: East Limerick
| Party | Candidate | Votes | % | ±% |
|---|---|---|---|---|
| Irish Parliamentary | Thomas Lundon | 2,664 | 61.2 | N/A |
| Ind. Nationalist | John Molony | 1,686 | 38.8 | New |
| Majority | | 978 | 22.4 | N/A |
| Turnout | | 4,350 | 59.3 | N/A |
| Registered electors | | 7,331 | | |
| Irish Parliamentary hold | | Swing | N/A | |

=== Elections in the 1910s ===
January 1910 general election: East Limerick
| Party | Candidate | Votes | % | ±% |
|---|---|---|---|---|
| Irish Parliamentary | Thomas Lundon | 3,077 | 51.3 | N/A |
| Ind. Nationalist | Thomas William Westropp Bennett | 2,918 | 48.7 | N/A |
| Majority | | 159 | 2.6 | N/A |
| Turnout | | 5,995 | 80.4 | N/A |
| Registered electors | | 7,455 | | |
| Irish Parliamentary hold | | Swing | N/A | |

December 1910 general election: East Limerick
| Party | Candidate | Votes | % | ±% |
|---|---|---|---|---|
| Irish Parliamentary | Thomas Lundon | 3,715 | 72.9 | +21.6 |
| All-for-Ireland | Hubert O'Connor | 1,381 | 27.1 | New |
| Majority | | 2,334 | 45.8 | +43.2 |
| Turnout | | 5,096 | 68.4 | −12.0 |
| Registered electors | | 7,455 | | |
| Irish Parliamentary hold | | Swing | +21.6 | |

General election, 1918: East Limerick
| Party | Candidate | Votes | % | ±% |
|---|---|---|---|---|
| Sinn Féin | Richard Hayes | 12,750 | 77.9 | New |
| Irish Parliamentary | Thomas Lundon | 3,608 | 22.1 | −50.8 |
| Majority | | 9,142 | 55.8 | N/A |
| Turnout | | 16,358 | 77.5 | +9.1 |
| Registered electors | | 21,095 | | |
| Sinn Féin gain from Irish Parliamentary | | Swing | | |
