= Máirtín =

Máirtín is an Irish given name. Notable people with the name include:

- Máirtín Mag Aonghusa or Martin McGuinness (1950–2017), Irish republican politician and statesman for Sinn Féin
- Máirtín Ó Cadhain (1906–1970), prominent Irish language writer
- Mairtín Crawford (1967–2004), poet and journalist from Northern Ireland
- Máirtín Ó Direáin (1910–1988), Irish poet from the Aran Islands Gaeltacht
- Máirtín Mac an Ghaill, social and educational theorist
- Máirtín Mac Con Iomaire, Irish lecturer and professional chef
- Máirtín Mór Ó Máille, alias Máilleach an Chaoráin (died 1800), Irish smuggler and duelist
- Máirtín Ó Muilleoir (born 1959), Irish Sinn Féin politician, author, publisher and businessman
- Máirtín Ó Murchú, Irish professor of Celtic studies
- Máirtín O'Connor, Irish button accordionist
- Máirtín Chóilín Choilmín Seoighe, the last living inhabitant of Inish Barra, Connemara
- Máirtín Standún (1918–1994), Irish Republican
- Mairtin Thornton (died 1984), Irish heavyweight boxer

== See also ==
- Naomh Máirtín CPG, Gaelic football and ladies' Gaelic football club in County Louth, Ireland
- Martin (name)
