= Smallcounty =

Barony in County Limerick, Ireland

Smallcounty An Déis Bheag (Irish)
- Barony
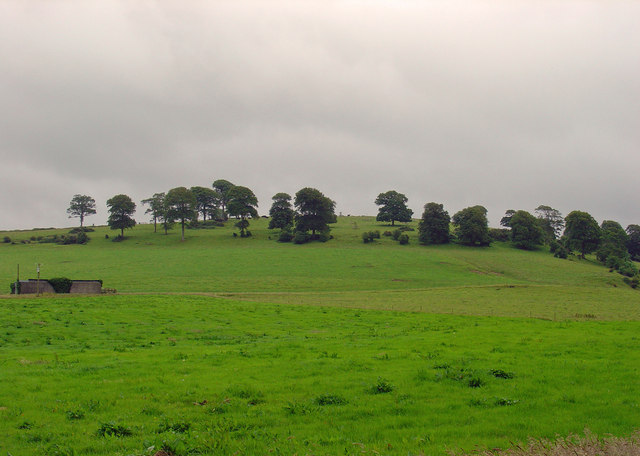
- Knockainy Hill

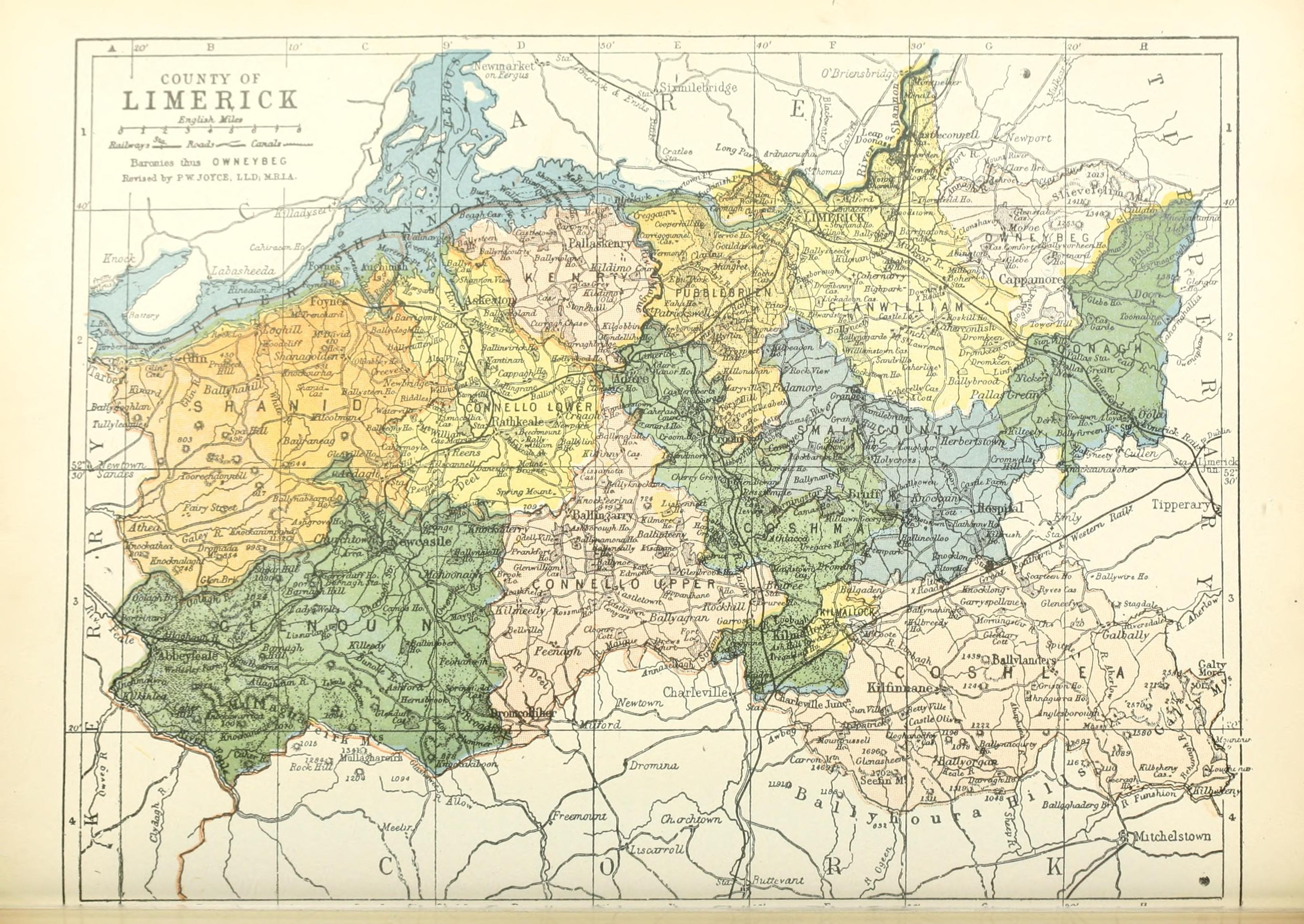
- Barony map of County Limerick, 1900; Smallcounty is in the east, coloured blue.

- Location within Ireland
- Coordinates: 52°30′N 8°32′W
- Sovereign state: Ireland
- Province: Munster
- County: Limerick

Area
  - Total: 179.8 km^{2} (69.4 sq mi)

Smallcounty or Small County (Irish: An Déis Bheag) is a historical barony in eastern County Limerick, Ireland. Settlements in the barony include Hospital, Herbertstown, Fedamore and Knockainy.

== Location ==
Located in County Limerick, the barony of Smallcounty is bordered by six other baronies:

- Clanwilliam (County Limerick), to the north,
- Coonagh, to the north-east,
- Clanwilliam (County Tipperary), to the east,
- Coshlea, to the south
- Coshma, to the west, the ancient territory of the Uí Fidgenti clan
- Pubblebrien, to the north-west

== Legal context ==
Baronies were created after the Norman invasion of Ireland as subdivisions of counties and were used for administration. While baronies continue to be officially defined units, they have been administratively obsolete since 1898. However, they continue to be used in land registration and specification such as in planning permissions. In many cases, a barony corresponds to an earlier Gaelic túath which had submitted to the Crown.

== History ==
‘’An Déis Bheag’’ was the name of a tribe from late Antiquity. The English form of the barony’s name may have been based on this name This barony lay partly in the Poor law union of Kilmallock, and partly in that of Limerick. In 1846, the total number of tenements valued was 2942.

Rateable Value	No. of Tenements
Under £5	1557
Under £10	291
Under £10	173
Under £20	141
Under £25	127
Under £30	92
Under £40	164
Under £50	103
Above £50	294

Some officers of the Regiment of the Lord President of Connaught, Sir Charles Coote, were rewarded for their services in the Cromwellian wars with land in the barony. They are listed as Col. Chidley Coote, Col. Richard Coote, Major Ormsby, Major King and Captain St. George. The land was rated at £800 per 1000 acres - the second highest in the county. In 1831, the population was 22,674; in 1841 it was 21,527. The 1841 census shows how families in the barony were employed.

Chief employment	No. of Families
on agriculture	2,776
on manufactures and trade	48
on other pursuits	210
Families dependent chiefly on property and professions	52
on the directing of labour	1,114
on their own manual labour	2,211
on means not specified	94

== Civil parishes ==
There are 18 civil parishes in the barony.

The following civil parishes are wholly contained within the barony:

- Ballinard
- Ballinlough
- Ballynamona
- Cahircorney
- Glenogra
- Hospital A house of the Knights Hospitaller gave its name to this place. The house had been established by 1215.
- Kilcullane
- Kilfrush
- Knockainy (i.e. the hill of Áine).

The barony also contains parts of the following civil parishes:

- Athneasy
- Ballycahane
- Fedamore
- Kilbreedymajor (or Kilbreedy Major)
- Kilpeacon
- Kilteely (This parish is one half of the ecclesiastical parish of Kilteely-Dromkeen. The Dromkeen part is a civil parish in its own right in the neighbouring barony of Clanwilliam.)
- Monasternenagh
- Tullabracky
- Uregare.
