= Kilteely-Dromkeen =

Parish in County Limerick, Ireland

Kilteely - Dromkeen Cill Tíle - Drom Caoin
- Parish
- Location in Ireland
- Coordinates: 52°31′23″N 8°24′14″W
- Country: Ireland
- Province: Munster
- County: County Limerick

Government
  - Dáil constituency: Limerick City
- Time zone: UTC+0 (WET)
  - Summer (DST): UTC+1 (IST (WEST))
- Area code: 061-38****
- Irish Grid Reference: R726413

Kilteely (Cill Tíle) and Dromkeen (Drom Chaoin) is an ecclesiastical parish in the Roman Catholic Archdiocese of Cashel and Emly that is located in eastern County Limerick, Ireland. The southern part of the parish is centred on the village of Kilteely (Irish: Cill Tíle or "The Church of Tidel") which is located at the foot of the Hill of Kilteely, about 14 miles south-east of the city of Limerick. It is also a civil parish in the ancient barony of Smallcounty. The northern part of the parish is centred on the village of Dromkeen (Irish: Drom Caoin or "The Smooth Ridge") which is located on the N24 Limerick–Waterford road, halfway between Limerick City and Tipperary town. It is also a civil parish in the barony of Clanwilliam.

== Geography ==
The landscape in this parish is different from the rest of the landscape in County Limerick which is predominantly flat. This is because Kilteely-Dromkeen is situated in one of the most important Carboniferous Volcanic districts in either Great Britain or Ireland. A variety of igneous rocks from two volcanic phases of about 300 million years ago can be found here. The volcanic plugs of Knockderk 220 m (782 ft) and Kilteely Hill 176 m (580 ft) are both conical in appearance, while in the neighbouring parish of Pallasgreen stands the Hill of Nicker, where hardened lavas have formed a cliff of basalt hexagons, similar to those found at the Giant's Causeway. As the area is within the Golden Vale, the land in this area is generally good, and is used primarily for the grazing of livestock and some tillage. The Mulkear River flows through the eastern edges of Dromkeen parish.

== History ==
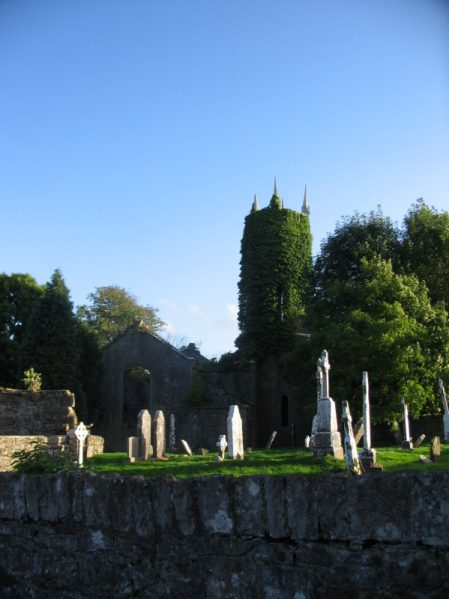
The old Church of Ireland church at Dromkeen, near the site of the Dromkeen Ambush.

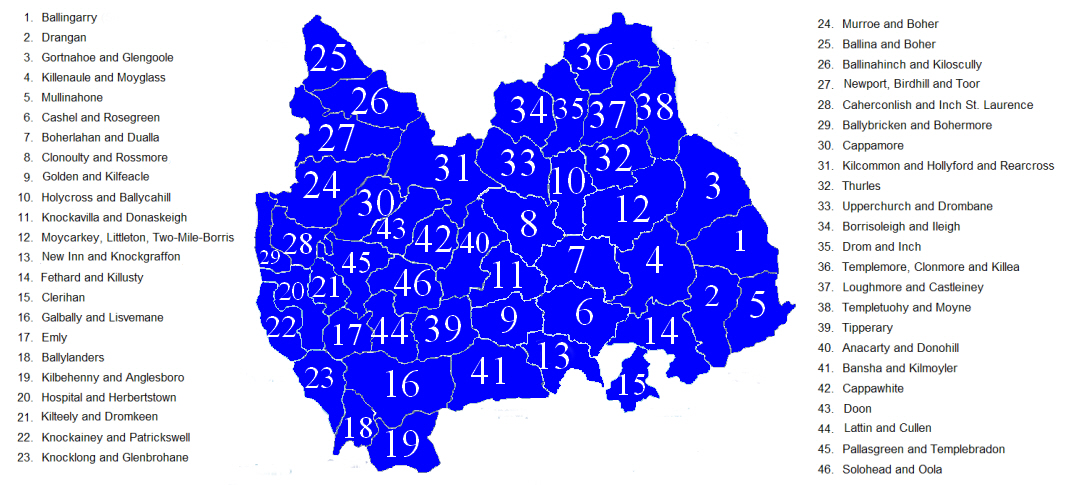
The location of the parish, numbered 21, within the Archdiocese

Dromkeen is famous for the Dromkeen Ambush, an attack on Black and Tan police forces during the Irish War of Independence in 1921. The attack was carried out near the old Church of Ireland church in a joint operation between the East Limerick and West Limerick Brigades of the Irish Republican Army (IRA). A flying column force of about 40 ambushed two lorries carrying between them thirteen Black and Tan police officers. Two of these managed to escape, but the other eleven were killed. It was one of the larger operations carried out by the IRA during the War of Independence.

In modern times, Dromkeen was well known for its ballroom of romance, "The Oyster Ballroom", owned by the Hayes family. Since its creation in 1958 through the 60s it enjoyed immense popularity and attracted large crowds – sometimes up to 2,000 dancers from counties Limerick and Tipperary – for the weekly Sunday night dance where the leading showbands of the day played on a regular basis. In 2015, the ballroom burned to the ground.

== Education ==
The parish is served by two primary schools; Kilteely National School is located in Kilteely village, Cloverfield National School is located in Dromkeen parish.

== Sport ==
There is a strong Gaelic Athletic Association (GAA) following in the area. Teams from Kilteely-Dromkeen GAA Club compete in the East Limerick Division at Junior and under-age competitions in hurling and Gaelic football. Kilteely AFC soccer club was founded in 1983 and plays in the Limerick city and county leagues.

== People ==
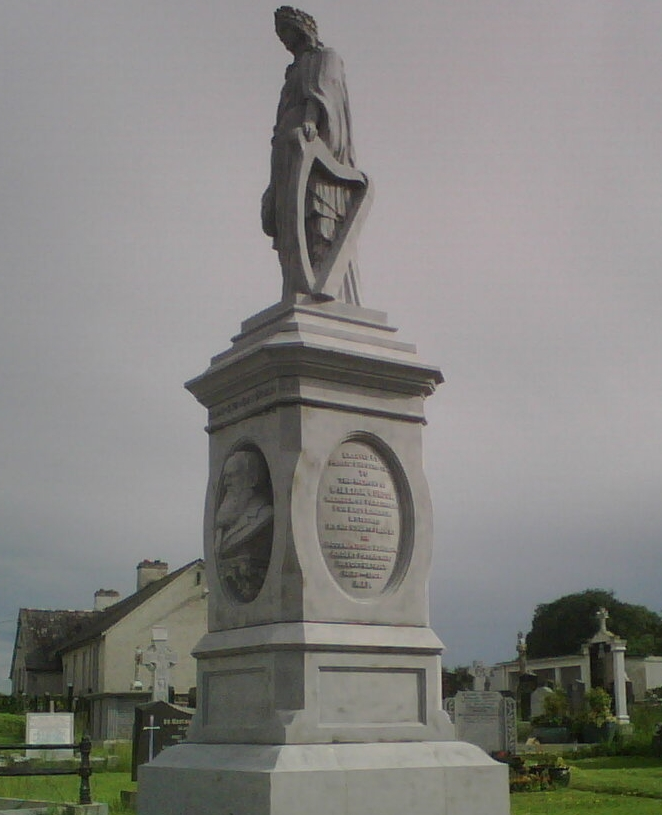
Monument commemorating William Lundon, in the graveyard at Kilteely village, County Limerick, Ireland.

- Joseph Bradshaw, Victoria Cross recipient
- Willie O'Dea (born 27 November 1952) - Fianna Fáil TD for Limerick City and Minister for Defence.
- John Francis Dillon (born 24 July 1930 - died 18 August 1952) - Killed in the Korean War.
- William Lundon (born 1839 - died 24 March 1909) - Irish Parliamentary Party M.P. for East Limerick.
- Major-General Liam Hayes (born 28 July 1892 - died 10 February 1959) Kilteely IRA, volunteer and injured in the Dromkeen Ambush which took place on 3 Feb 1921 and Sinn Féin (Pro-Treaty) TD Limerick 1921-23 and father of international showjumper Seamus Hayes (born 1924 – died 1989).

== Transport ==
- Dromkeen railway station opened on 2 February 1851, closed for goods traffic on 9 September 1963, and finally closed altogether on 6 September 1976.

== See also ==
- List of towns and villages in Ireland
