= Clanwilliam (County Limerick) =

Barony (historical administrative unit) in County Limerick, Ireland

Clanwilliam Clann Liam (Irish)
- Barony
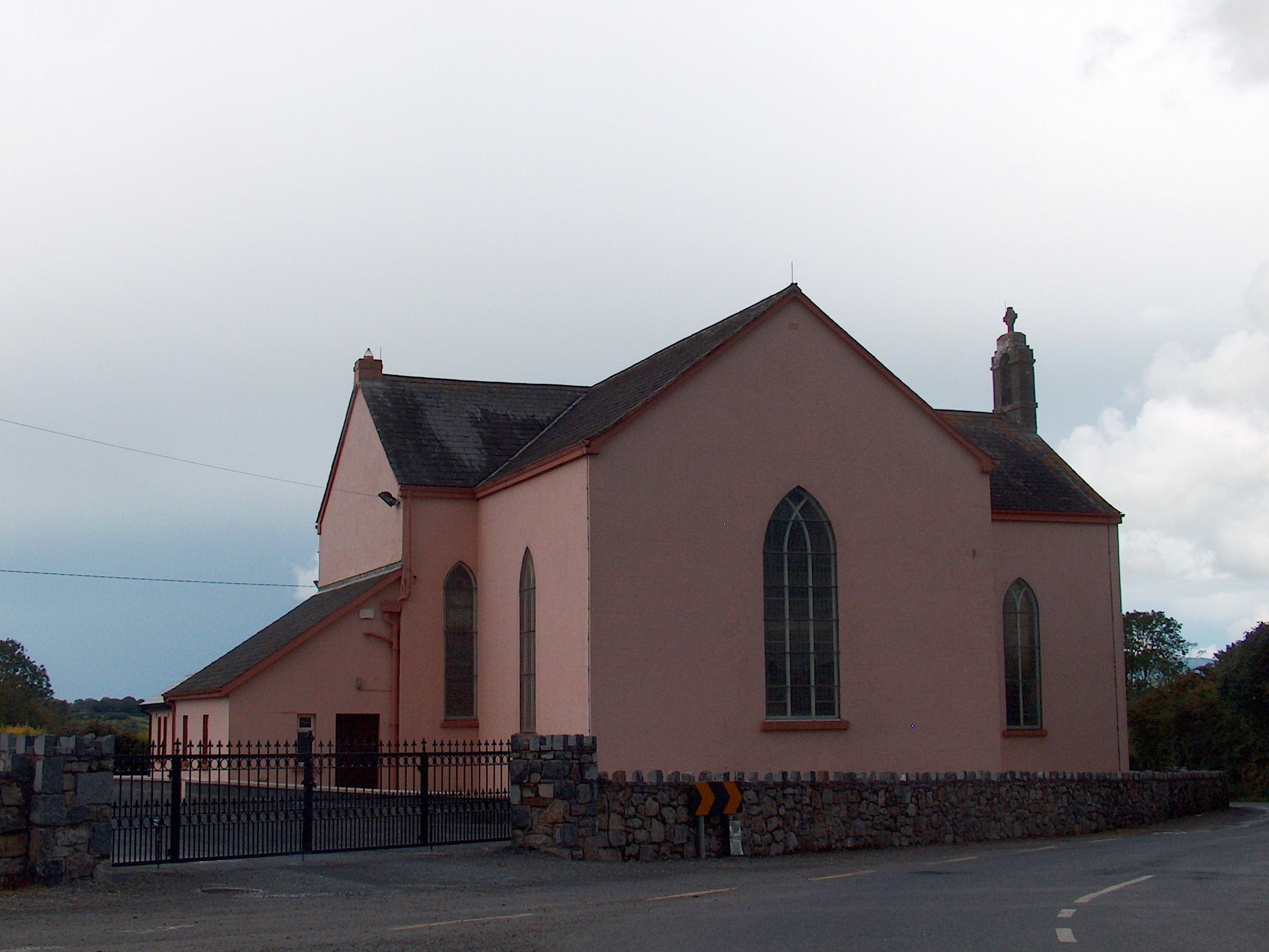
- Church of St Nicholas, Boher

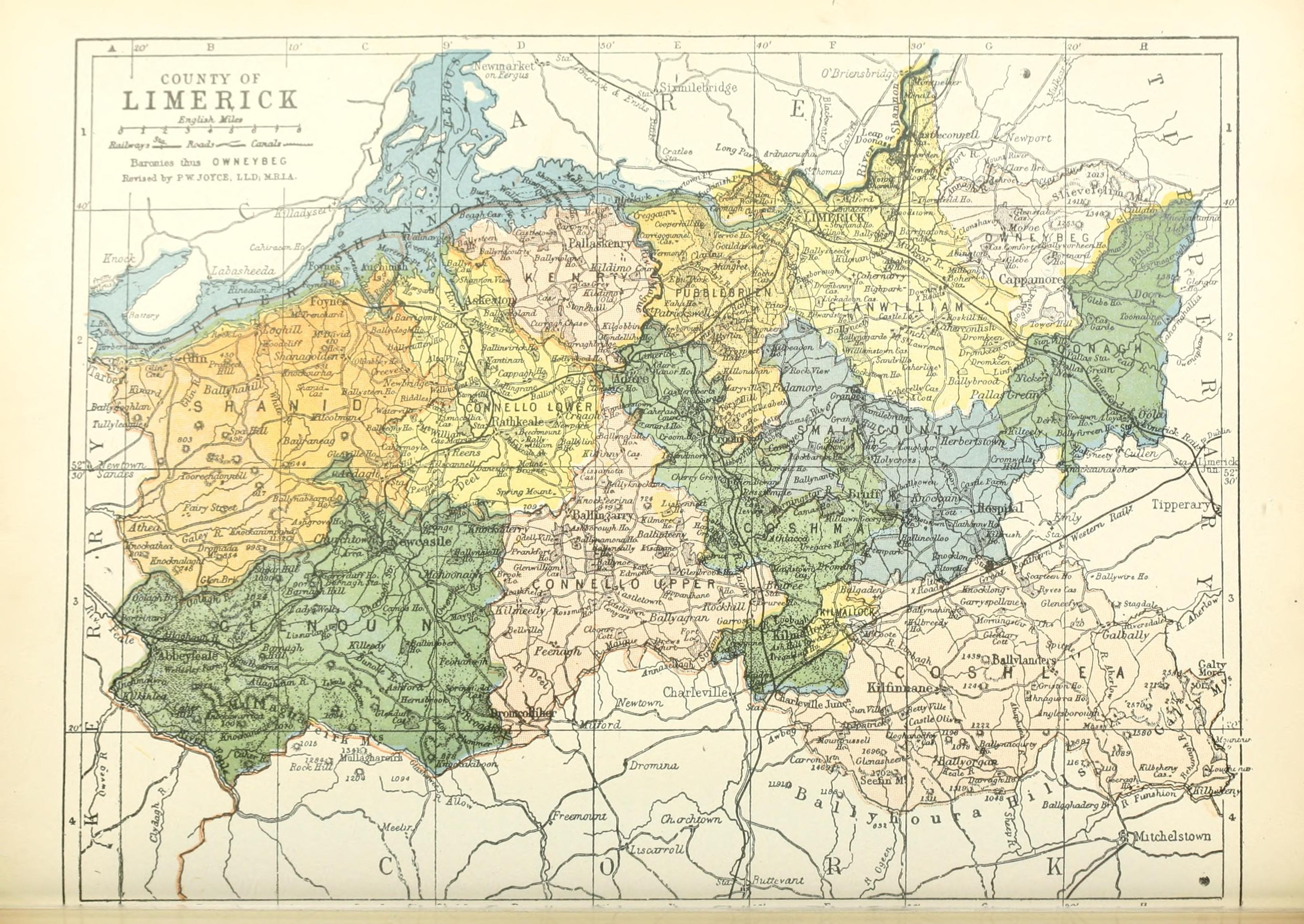
- Barony map of County Limerick, 1900; Clanwilliam is in the northeast, coloured yellow.

- Location within Ireland
- Coordinates: 52°37′N 8°29′W
- Sovereign state: Ireland
- Province: Munster
- County: Limerick

Area
  - Total: 468.4 km^{2} (180.9 sq mi)

Clanwilliam (Irish: Clann Liam) is a barony in County Limerick, Ireland. According to Patrick Weston Joyce, the name Clanwilliam derives from the descendants (clan) of William de Burgh, founder of the Burke dynasty; similarly for the Tipperary barony of Clanwilliam.

Clanwilliam is bordered by the baronies of Owneybeg to the east, Coonagh to the southeast, and Smallcounty to the south; to the west are Pubblebrien, Limerick City and the North Liberties. To the north across the River Shannon is County Clare; to the northeast is County Tipperary.

Settlements in the barony include Castleconnell, Caherconlish, Garryowen, Barringtonsbridge, Janesboro, and Monaleen.

== See also ==
- Clanwilliam (County Tipperary) – a barony of the same name in the adjoining county
