= Kilmallock (barony) =

Barony in County Limerick, Ireland

Kilmallock Cill Mocheallóg (Irish)
- Barony
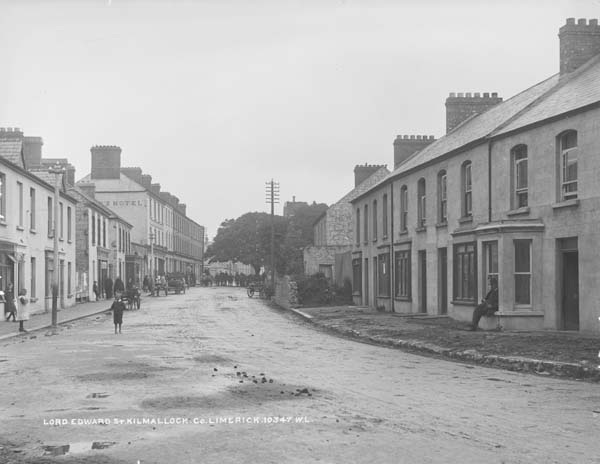
- Lord Edward St., Kilmallock, c. 1890

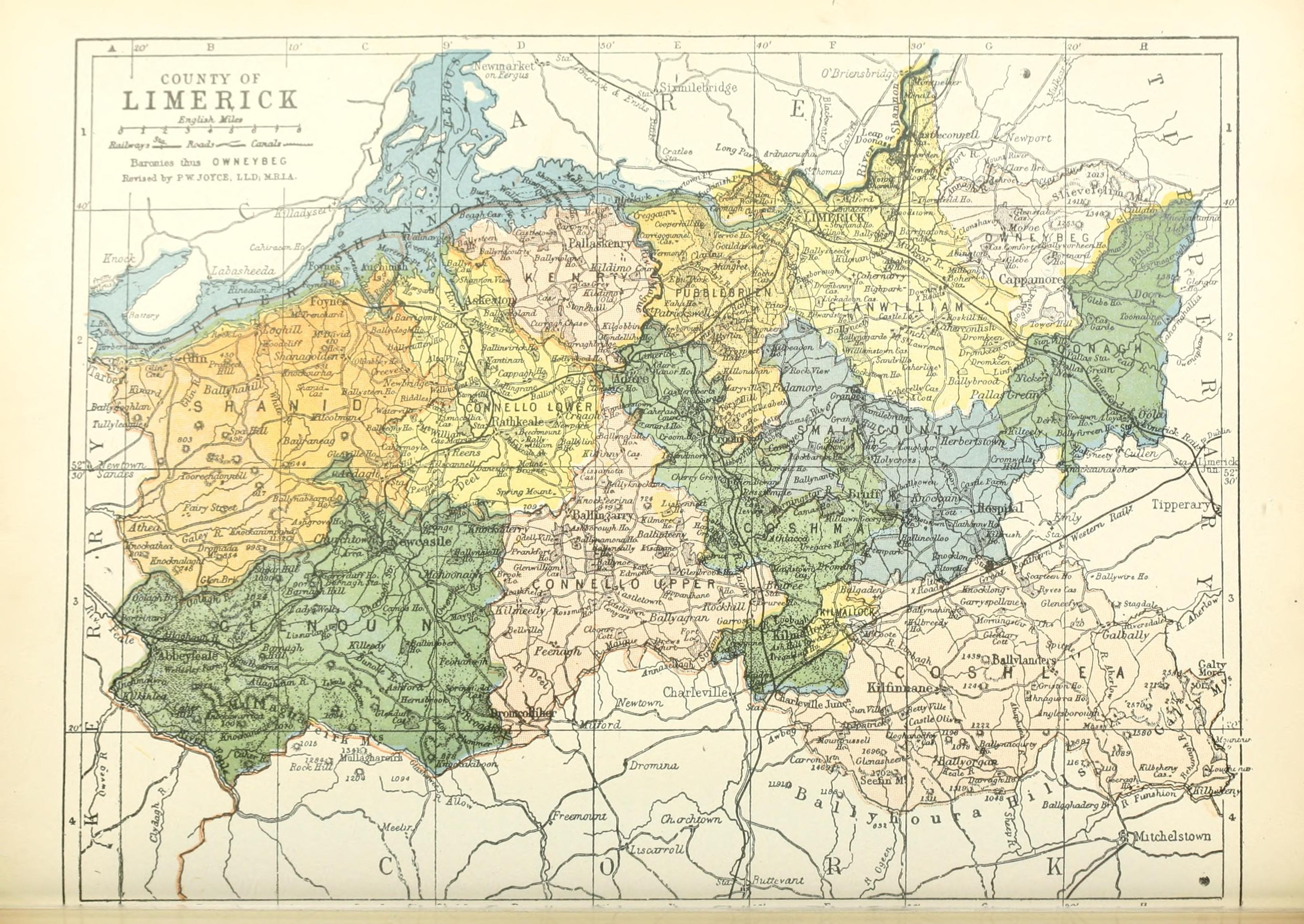
- Barony map of County Limerick, 1900; Kilmallock is in the south, coloured yellow.

- Location within Ireland
- Coordinates: 52°24′N 8°35′W
- Sovereign state: Ireland
- Province: Munster
- County: Limerick

Area
  - Total: 16.5 km^{2} (6.4 sq mi)

Kilmallock (Irish: Cill Mocheallóg), also known as the Liberties of Kilmallock, was a historical barony in southern County Limerick, Ireland.

Baronies were mainly cadastral rather than administrative units. They acquired modest local taxation and spending functions in the 19th century before being superseded by the Local Government (Ireland) Act 1898.

== History ==
Kilmallock was owned by the Desmond Geraldines (FitzGeralds). Land in the Liberties of Kilmallock was granted to Murrough O'Brien, 1st Earl of Inchiquin in 1667. It was originally part of Coshlea before being cut out some time around 1672, although sometimes it was treated as part of Coshlea, as in the 1821 census.

== Geography ==
Kilmallock is in south-east County Limerick, between the baronies of Coshma and Coshlea, near the county border with Cork. It is part of the civil parish of St Peter and St Paul. Kilmallock is approximately 40km from Limerick city.

== List of settlements ==
Settlements within the historical barony of Kilmallock include:

- Kilmallock
