= North Liberties =

Barony of County Limerick in Ireland

North Liberties Na Líbeartaí Thuaidh (Irish)
- Barony
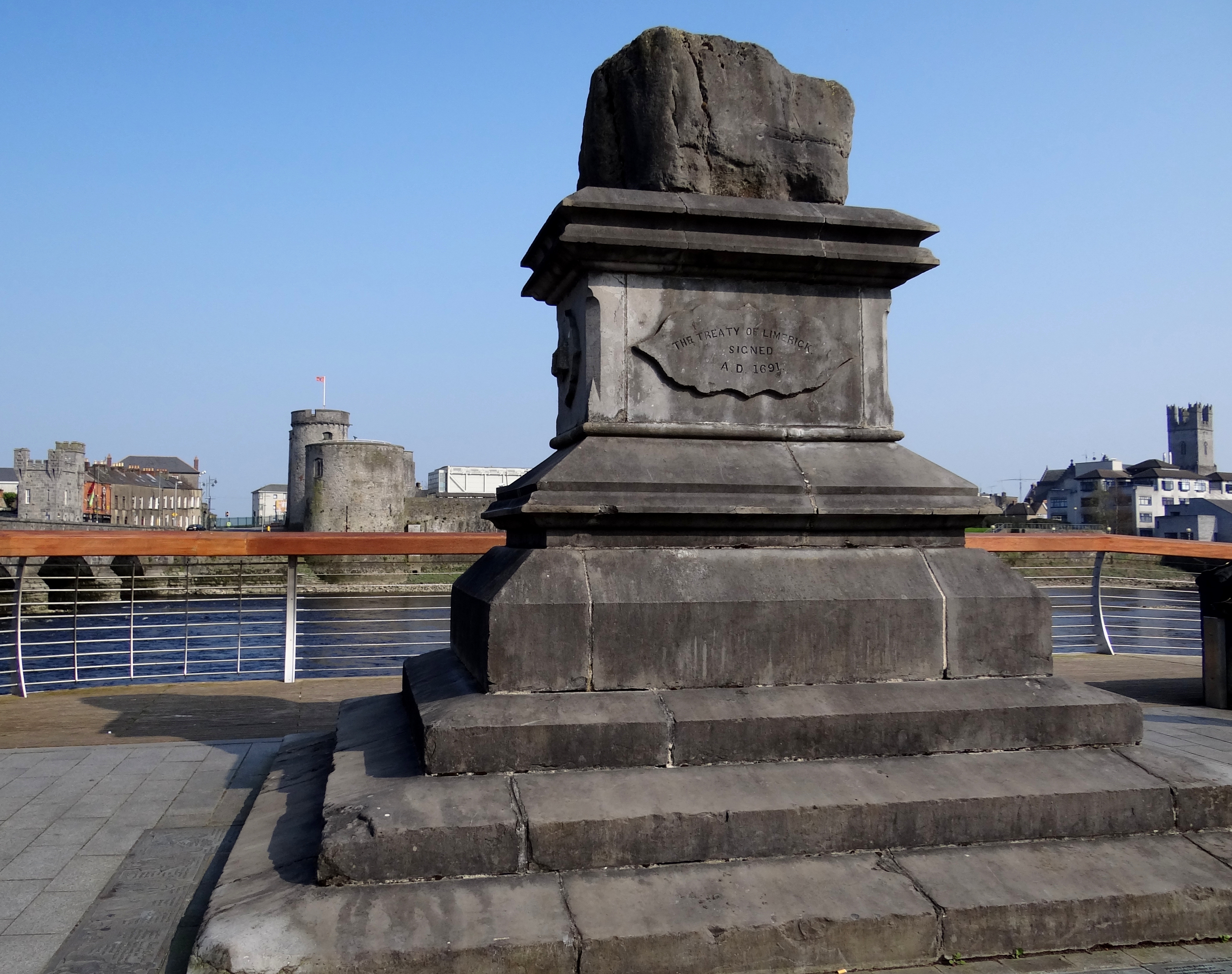
- Treaty Stone

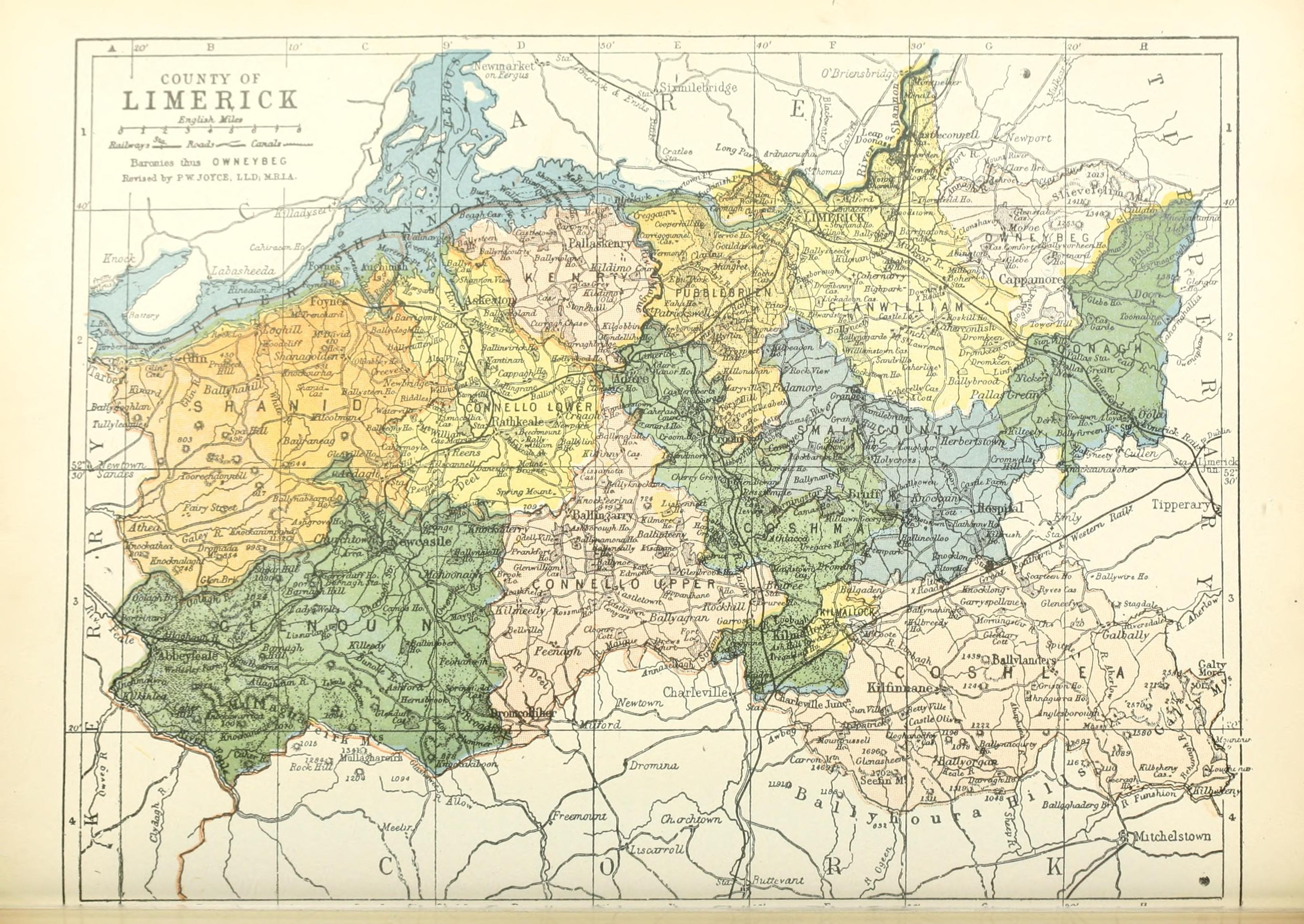
- Barony map of County Limerick, 1900; The North Liberties is the orange region north of the River Shannon.

- Location within Ireland
- Coordinates: 52°40′N 8°39′W
- Sovereign state: Ireland
- Province: Munster
- County: Limerick

Area
  - Total: 12.3 km^{2} (4.7 sq mi)

The North Liberties (Irish: Na Líbeartaí Thuaidh) or North Liberties of Limerick is a barony of County Limerick in Ireland, on the north bank of the River Shannon, between the centre of Limerick City to the east and County Clare to the north and west. It comprises parts of 17 townlands in three civil parishes: Killeely, St. Munchin's, and St. Nicholas.

The area of the North Liberties was originally part of Bunratty barony, now in County Clare. It was created by King John in 1216 and granted to the City of Limerick. The 1609 royal charter from James I of England for the municipal corporation of Limerick granted it portions of rural land outside the municipal borough, and erected the whole area into a corporate county, the "county of the city of Limerick", separate from the "county-at-large" of Limerick, and with its own sheriff and grand jury. The rural areas, called the "liberties", were inside the county of the city but outside the borough boundary. There were three parts to the liberties: the small "North Liberties", the larger "South Liberties" east of the borough on the opposite bank of the River Shannon, and Scattery Island far to the west at the Mouth of the Shannon. In the 1650s, after the Cromwellian conquest of Ireland, the North Liberties were included in the Civil Survey but not the Down Survey, whose supervisor William Petty was himself awarded the lands. The Municipal Corporations (Ireland) Act 1840 detached all the liberties from the county of the city and attached them to the county-at-large. The majority of the North Liberties was therefore annexed to the County of Clare. The 1846 Parliamentary Gazetteer and the census through to 1871 regarded the North Liberties as having been annexed to the barony of Pubblebrien, the rest of which was adjacent but south across the Shannon. However, the 1881 census treated the North Liberties as a barony in its own right. A 2008 extension to the boundary of Limerick city encompasses some of the entire area of the North Liberties, however some still remains within the County of Clare.

== Sources ==
- Hodkinson, Brian (2007). "A History and Archaeology of the Liberties of Limerick to c.1650" (PDF). North Munster Antiquarian Journal. 47 (4): 39–66. Archived from the original (PDF) on 8 June 2020.
