= John Finucane (Limerick politician) =

John Finucane (c. 1843 – 23 March 1902) was an Irish farmer and politician.

Finucane was educated at Thurles College (taking first honours in rhetoric, logic and metaphysic) and Maynooth College, with the intention of joining the priesthood. Instead he became a farmer, and was for many years Honorary Secretary of the Limerick and Clare Farmers' Club.

From 1885 to 1900 he was Member of Parliament for County Limerick East, representing the Irish Parliamentary Party. At the time of the Parnell split he was an anti-Parnellite. He lived in Coole House, Caherelly, County Limerick.

== Notes ==
Parliament of the United Kingdom
New constituency	Member of Parliament for County Limerick East; 1885 – 1900	Succeeded by William Lundon
