= Thomas Lundon =

Irish politician

Thomas Lundon (21 June 1883 – 28 October 1951) was an Irish nationalist politician and Member of Parliament (MP) in the House of Commons of the United Kingdom of Great Britain and Ireland.

He was first elected as the Irish Parliamentary Party MP for the East Limerick constituency at the 1909 East Limerick by-election following the death of the sitting MP, his father William Lundon. He was re-elected at the January 1910 and December 1910 general elections, but lost his seat at the 1918 general election. His grand nephew is Tony Lundon.

Parliament of the United Kingdom
Preceded by William Lundon	Member of Parliament for East Limerick; 1909 – 1918	Succeeded by Richard Hayes
