= 1909 East Limerick by-election =

UK Parliamentary by-election

The 1909 East Limerick by-election was held on 10 June 1909. The by-election was held due to the death of the incumbent Irish Parliamentary MP, William Lundon. It was won by the Irish Parliamentary candidate, his son Thomas Lundon.

1909 East Limerick by-election
Party	Candidate	Votes	%	±%
Irish Parliamentary	Thomas Lundon	2,664	61.2	N/A
Ind. Nationalist	John Molony	1,686	38.8	New
Majority		978	22.4	N/A
Turnout		4,350	59.3	N/A
Registered electors		7,331		
Irish Parliamentary hold		Swing	N/A	
