= Knockainey =

Civil parish in County Limerick, Ireland

Coordinates: 52.4737°N 8.4682°W

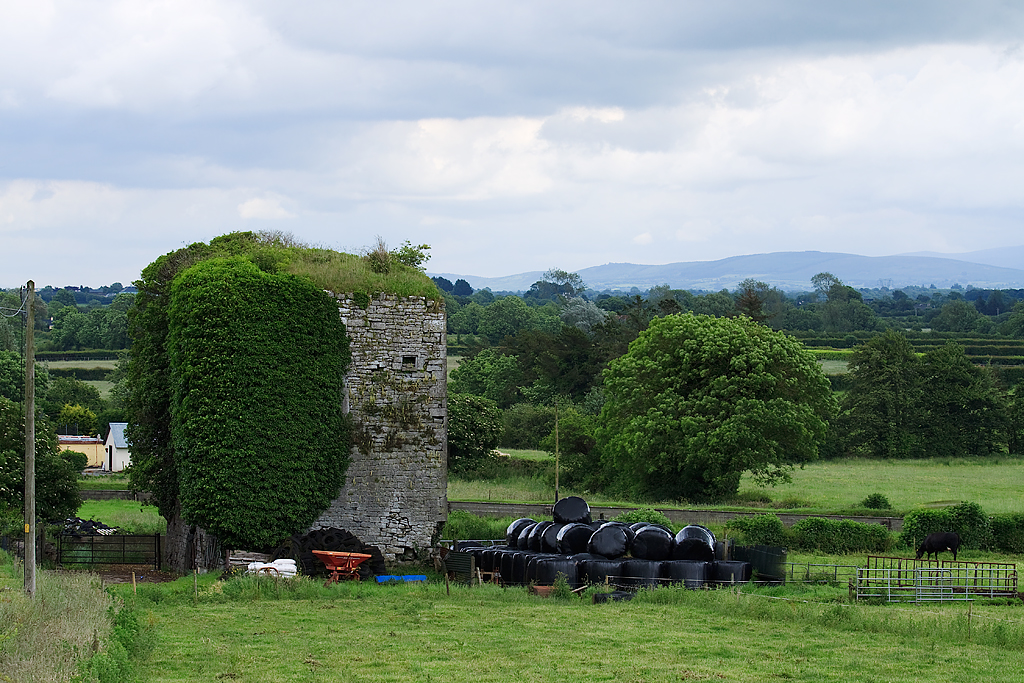
Knockainy Castle is a 15th or 16th century tower house

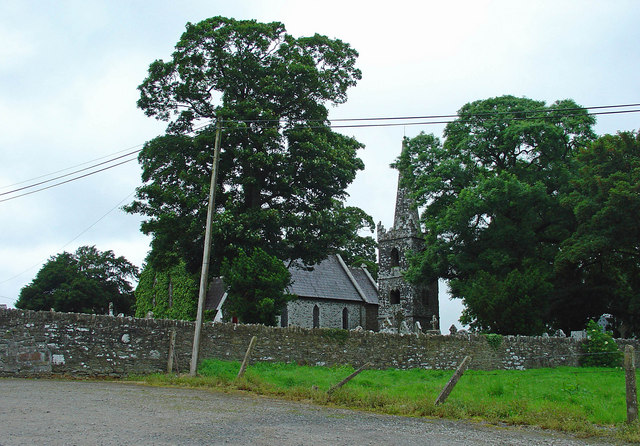
Saint John's Church (Church of Ireland) was deconsecrated in 1999

Knockainey or Knockainy (Irish: Cnoc Áine, meaning 'hill of Áine') is a civil parish and village in County Limerick, Ireland. It is in the historical barony of Smallcounty, between the towns of Hospital and Bruff.

There are a large number of archaeological sites in the area, including several on Knockainy Hill in the townland of Knockainy West. These remains, which include cursus, cairn, ring fort, standing stone and ring barrow sites, form part of a complex traditionally associated with the sun goddess Áine. A nearby clapper bridge, known as Clochán Áine, is also associated with Áine. Knockainy Castle is a 15th or 16th century tower house, associated by several sources with the O'Grady family, who were stewards to the Earls of Desmond.

The former Church of Ireland church in Knockainy, dedicated to Saint John, was built in the 19th century on the site of a much earlier ecclesiastical enclosure. The building's bell tower dates to the 17th century, and there is an O'Grady family plaque dating to the early 16th century. This church was deconsecrated in 1999 and is now used to host events. The local Catholic church, a more modern building, is located to the south. It forms part of the parish of Knockaney and Patrickswell in the Roman Catholic Archdiocese of Cashel and Emly.

The local national (primary) school, Knockainey National School or Scoil Náisiúnta Cnoc Áine, had an enrollment of 181 pupils as of January 2024. The local Gaelic Athletic Association (GAA) club, Knockainey GAA, won the Limerick Intermediate Hurling Championship in 2001.
