= Kathleen O'Callaghan =

Irish politician and academic (1885–1961)

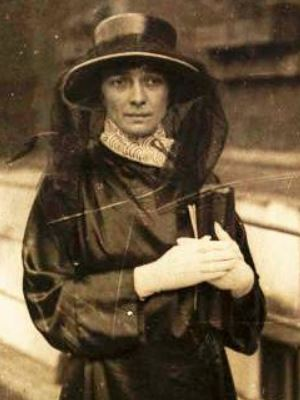
- O'Callaghan in her widow's attire, in 1921

Teachta Dála
- In office May 1921 – August 1923
- Constituency: Limerick City–Limerick East

Personal details
- Born: Kathleen Murphy; 11 October 1885 Lissandra, Crossmahon, County Cork, Ireland
- Died: 16 March 1961 (aged 75) Limerick, Ireland
- Party: Sinn Féin
- Spouse: Michael O'Callaghan (m. 1914–1921)
- Education: Royal University of Ireland; University of Cambridge

British Army intelligence file for Kate O'Callaghan

Kathleen O'Callaghan (née Murphy; 11 October 1885 – 16 March 1961) was an Irish Sinn Féin politician and academic.

She was born at Lissandra, Crossmahon, Bandon, County Cork in 1885. She was educated at St Mary's Dominican College, Dublin, the Royal University of Ireland and the University of Cambridge. Before entering politics she was a member of Cumann na mBan. In 1914, she married Michael O'Callaghan, who later became a Limerick City Councillor and Mayor of Limerick. He was killed in front of her by the Auxiliary Division of the Royal Irish Constabulary at their home in 1921.

She was first elected to Dáil Éireann as a Sinn Féin Teachta Dála (TD) at the 1921 elections for the Limerick City–Limerick East constituency. She voted against the Anglo-Irish Treaty and sided with Éamon de Valera. She was re-elected at the 1922 general election, this time as an Anti-Treaty Sinn Féin TD. In accordance with Sinn Féin abstentionist policy of the time, she did not take her seat in the 3rd Dáil. She lost her seat at the 1923 general election.

She was a senior lecturer in education at Mary Immaculate College from 1912 to 1914, and again from 1924 to 1928.

Dáil	Election	Deputy (Party)	Deputy (Party)	Deputy (Party)	Deputy (Party)
2nd	1921	Richard Hayes (SF)	William Hayes (SF)	Kathleen O'Callaghan (SF)	Michael Colivet (SF)
3rd	1922	Richard Hayes (PT-SF)	William Hayes (PT-SF)	Kathleen O'Callaghan (AT-SF)	Michael Colivet (AT-SF)
4th	1923	Constituency abolished. See Limerick			
