= The Big Fellow =

1937 biography by Frank O'Connor

- First edition
- Author: Frank O'Connor
- Language: English
- Genre: Biography
- Publisher: Thomas Nelson and Sons
- Publication date: 1937
- Publication place: Ireland
- Media type: Print (Hardback & Paperback)
- Pages: 222 (US hardback edition)
- OCLC: 37437559
- Dewey Decimal: 941.5082/2 21
- LC Class: DA965.C6 O244 1998

The Big Fellow is a 1937 biography of the famed Irish leader, Michael Collins, by Frank O'Connor.

The Big Fellow covers the period of Collins's life from the Easter Rising in 1916 to his death during the Irish Civil War in 1922. Unlike most conventional biographies of famous leaders, O'Connor establishes a clear goal in portraying Collins's character and human qualities above his major achievements. Through his friendship with Richard Hayes, O'Connor was able to meet and interview many people who had known Collins; in particular he received invaluable information from Collins' secretary, Joe O'Reilly.

O'Connor, having served with the Anti-Treaty faction during the Irish Civil War, wrote The Big Fellow as a form of reparation over the guilt he felt with regard to taking up arms against his fellow Irishmen and Collins's untimely death. Liam Neeson has said that he found the book of great assistance when preparing for the role of Collins in the 1996 film directed by Neil Jordan.
