= William Lundon =

Irish politician

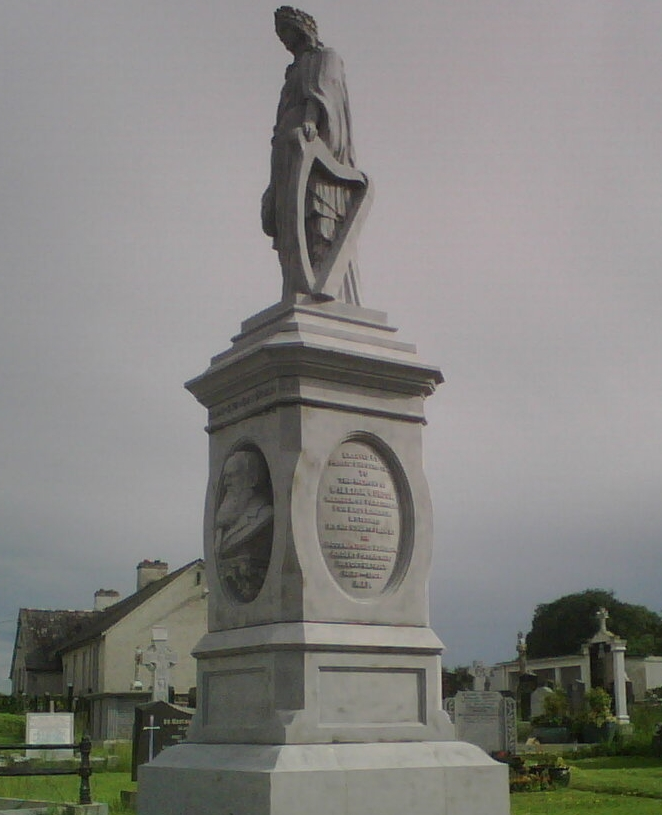
Monument commemorating William Lundon, which stands in the grounds of the graveyard at Kilteely village, which is situated in County Limerick, Ireland

William Lundon (1839 – 24 March 1909) was an Irish nationalist politician and MP in the House of Commons of the United Kingdom of Great Britain and Ireland and as member of the Irish Parliamentary Party represented East Limerick when elected to the 27th Parliament of the United Kingdom at the 1900 general election and re-elected to the 28th Parliament at the 1906 general election.

Lundon, who was a professor of languages and teacher of classics, supported the Irish independent movement. He was a member of the Fenian Brotherhood and following the 1867 Fenian Rising, was imprisoned for two years under the Acts to Suspend the Rights of Habeas Corpus 1866. He also served a short prison sentence in 1889 for coercion during a period of protest in Ireland referred to as the Land War. During his time in the House of Commons he was described as a kindly figure and popular with his colleagues.

He died in office in March 1909, and the by-election for his seat was won by his son Thomas Lundon. A monument commemorating him stands in the grounds of Kilteely graveyard, which is situated in County Limerick, Ireland.

Parliament of the United Kingdom
Preceded by John Finucane	Member of Parliament for East Limerick; 1900 – 1909	Succeeded by Thomas Lundon
