= Standun =

- Company type: Private company
- Industry: Retail
- Genre: Department Store
- Founded: 1946
- Founder: Mairtin Standun
- Headquarters: Spiddal, County Galway, Ireland
- Key people: Cliona Standun
- Products: Quality & luxury goods
- Services: Worldwide
- Website: www.standun.com

Standun is a departmental store which is situated at the entrance of Spiddal village in Connemara, County Galway, Ireland. It has been in service for more than 65 years.

== History ==
Standun was founded in 1946 by May and Mairtin Standun and since then it has been a thriving business in Spiddal. May and Mairtin Standun bought a small 2 bedroom bungalow. But within a few days, the tiny shop founded in 1946 turned into an all purpose store selling things from groceries, general household goods, clothes, footwear, furniture, ice-cream parlor, bedding and bicycles to cement and other building materials as well as a filling station. Standun, known as the home of the Aran Sweater, has become the destination for both tourists and locals. In 1972 Donal, May and Mairtin’s son, took over the business. Nowadays, Standun is managed by Cliona Standun, the granddaughter of the founders.

== Products ==
In the 1960s, Standun set up a factory for Aran sweaters which became the most important aspect of Standun, specially when the tourist industry began to grow in the 1970s. The sweaters were collected from the knitters and brought to the factory for finishing. In 1983 and afterwards, Standún became a landmark in Connemara for great value knitwear and good quality Irish products.

== Other information ==
Standun was recommended in guidebooks such as Frommers. It won the Wall Street Journal Award for the best place to buy an Aran Sweater online and Best Of Galway Awards in 2013. It also starred the National TV and Radio of Ireland.
