= Coonagh Castle =

Ruined tower house in County Limerick, Ireland

- Caisleán Ó gCuanach (Irish)
- Coolbaun Castle, Castletown Coonagh
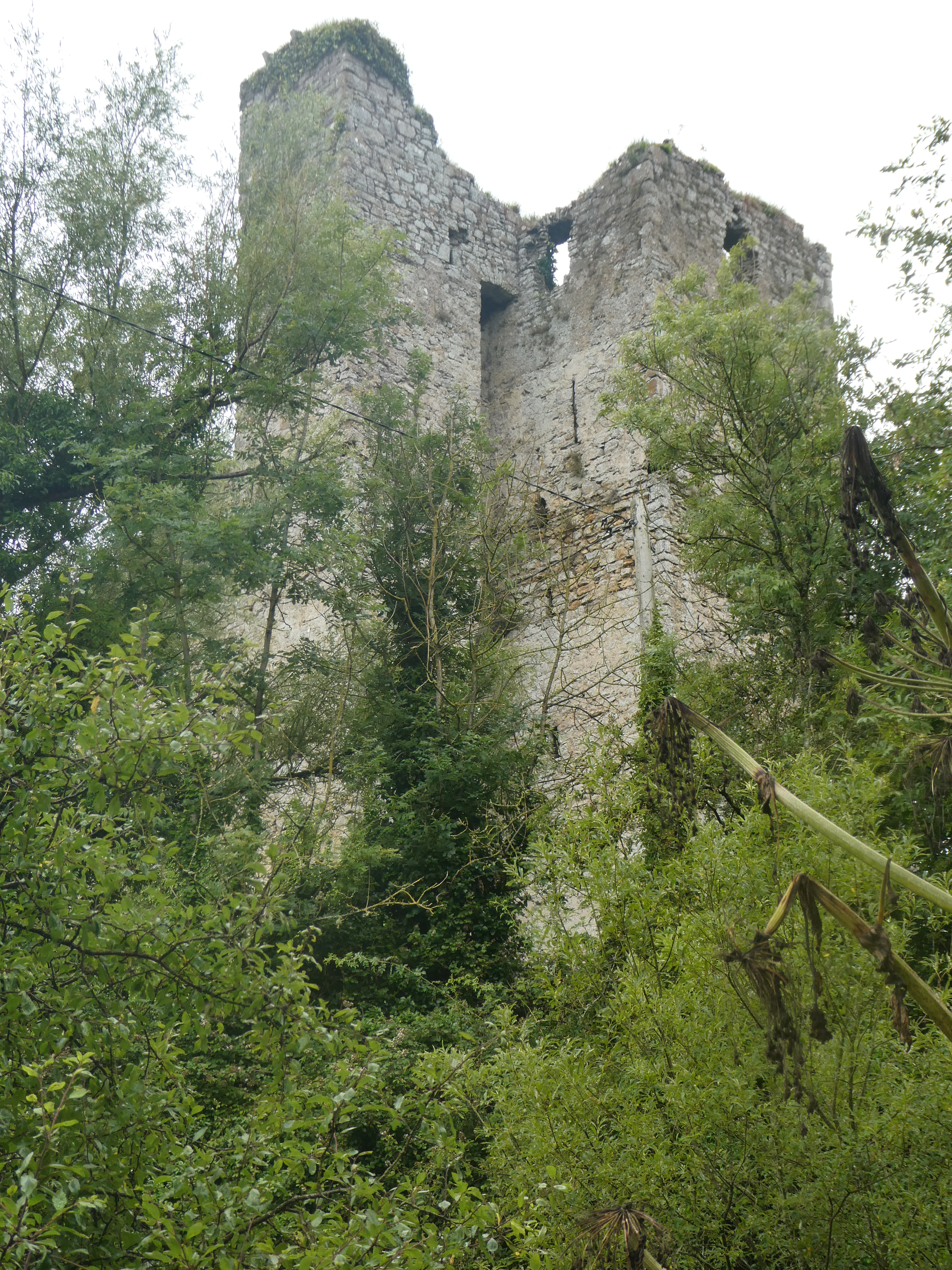
- The castle

- Location within Ireland
- 52°34′57″N 8°15′36″W
- Type: Donjon
- Location: Coolbaun, Doon, County Limerick, Ireland

History
- Built: c. 1225

Coonagh Castle, also called Coolbaun Castle, is a ruined 13th-century tower house located in County Limerick, Ireland.

== Location ==
Coonagh Castle is located 2.6 km (1.6 mi) west-southwest of the village of Doon, County Limerick. It lies on the west bank of the Cahernahallia River, a tributary of the Dead River, itself a tributary of the Mulkear.

== History ==
The castle was built c. 1225 by a powerful Hiberno-Norman couple, William and Matilda de Marisco. It was the capital manor of the medieval cantred of Okonagh or Oconagh, equivalent to the ancient barony of Coonagh. There may have been an earlier fort on the site, built by William de Braose, 4th Lord of Bramber in the 12th century. The land was confiscated by King John in 1210. A grant of Okonagh, with the vill of Tipperary and the advowson of its parish church, was granted to the Augustinian Friary of the Most Holy Trinity, Dublin. It was later passed to Matilda, a relative of King Henry II, when she married William de Marisco some time before 1226.

In November 1234 the de Mariscos lost the castle as punishment for siding with Richard Marshal, 3rd Earl of Pembroke against the King. King Henry III granted it to Luke, Archbishop of Dublin. In 1242, Luke granted a 20-year lease of the manor of Coonagh to Maurice FitzGerald, 2nd Lord of Offaly. It was taken back by the King in 1244.

In 1281 it was granted to Otto de Grandson. It disappears from the record after this and was allowed to decay.

== Castle ==
The castle is on flat ground which is bordered by a curving break of slope on its south side. The donjon (keep) measures 14.3 m × 9 m (47 ft × 30 ft) internally, and the walls were up to 14 m (46 ft) high (only some of the walls survive). The turret is 5.2 m × 3.4 m (17 ft × 11 ft) externally. The donjon's basement had very thick walls, up to 3.3 m (11 ft) in places.

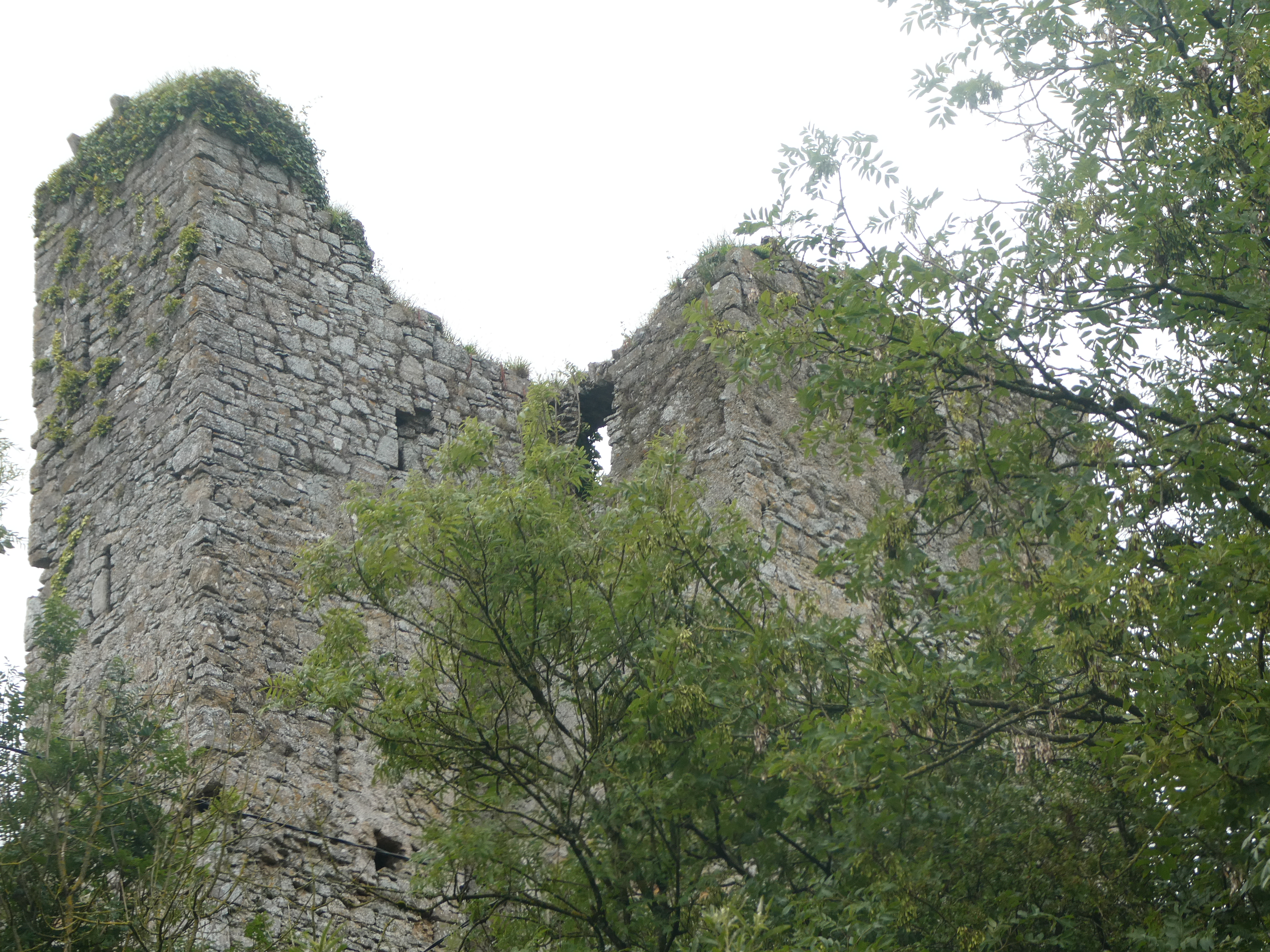
Top of tower

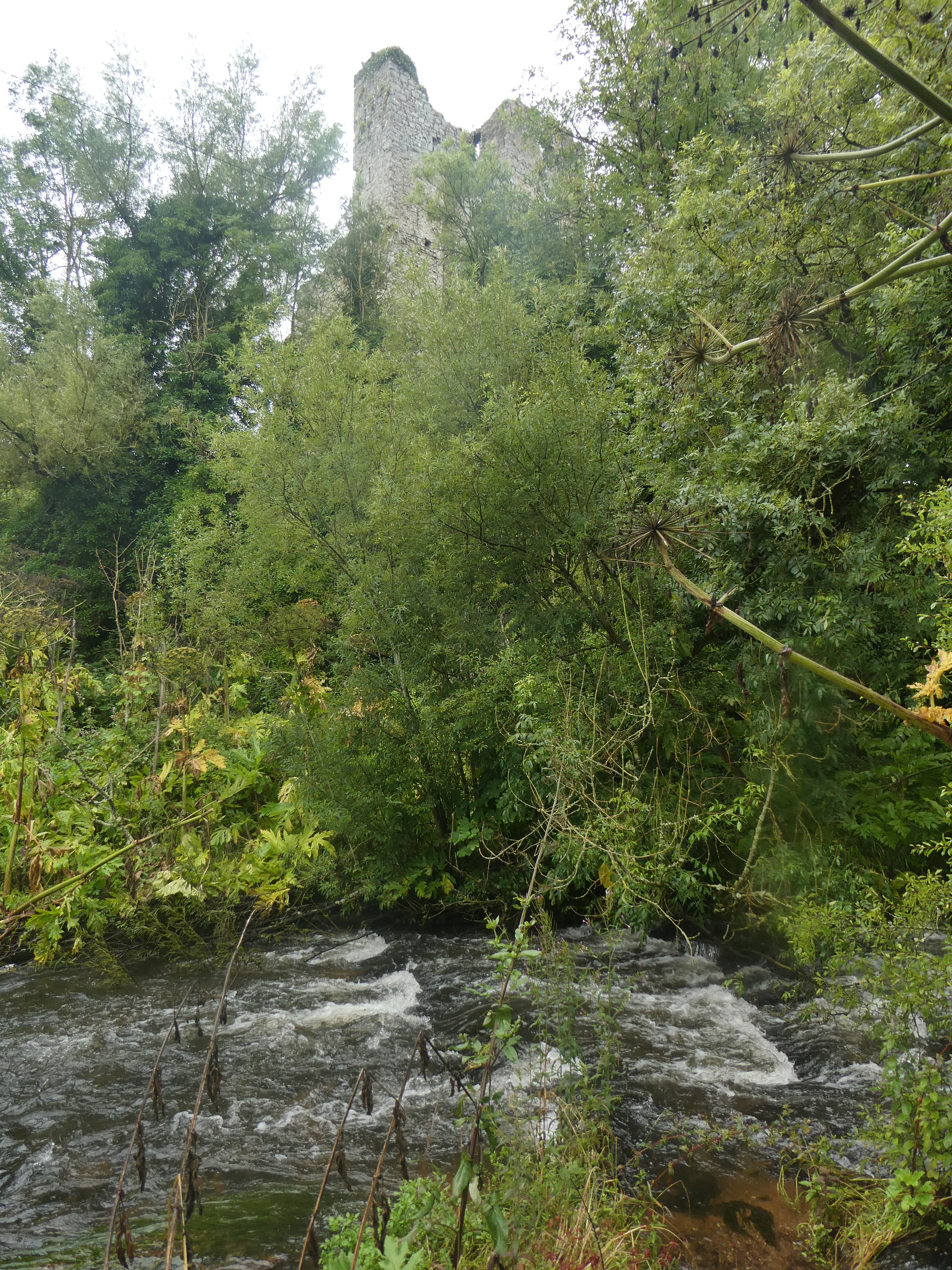
View from the Cahernahallia River

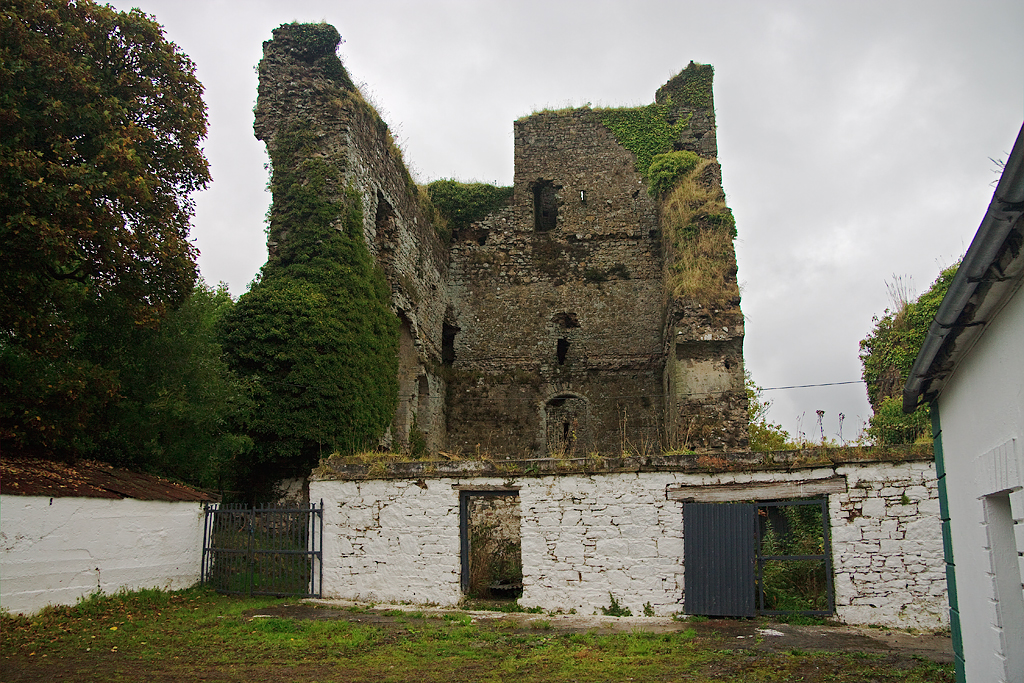
Viewed from the west
