= Dromkeen ambush =

Ambush during the Irish War of Independence

- Part of the Irish War of Independence
Date	3 February 1921
Location	Dromkeen, County Limerick 52.554°N 8.391°W
Result	Irish victory

Belligerents
Irish Republican Army	(United Kingdom of Great Britain and Ireland) Royal Irish Constabulary

Commanders and leaders
Donnacha O'Hannigan	(United Kingdom of Great Britain and Ireland) DI A. J. W. Sanson

Strength
40 to 50 volunteers	13 police constables

Casualties and losses
1 wounded	11 killed
- Location within island of Ireland

The Dromkeen ambush took place on 3 February 1921, during the Irish War of Independence, at Dromkeen in County Limerick. The Irish Republican Army (IRA) ambushed a Royal Irish Constabulary (RIC) patrol, killing 11 policemen.

== Ambush ==
The ambush was carried out by the flying columns of the East and Mid Limerick Brigades IRA, some 40 riflemen, under the command of Donnocha O'Hannigan commander of East Limerick Brigade Flying Column and Richard O'Connell commander of the Mid Limerick Brigade. Some time earlier the RIC had found the arms dump of the Mid-Limerick Brigade. Only one IRA volunteer—Liam Hayes—was wounded.

Only two of the RIC got away. Nine were killed in action and another two were executed after being taken prisoner. Three of the dead RIC officers were Irish and the rest were British Black and Tans. In reprisal, British forces burnt ten homes and farms in the area.

It has been claimed that three of the RIC dead were executed after they had surrendered. Particular suspicion for this alleged killing of prisoners has fallen on Maurice Meade, a former British soldier who was captured by the Germans in the First World War and had joined Roger Casement's Irish Brigade. In reprisal, at least eight local properties were destroyed.

In February 2009, up to 2,000 people turned up for the unveiling of a memorial to the ambush.
