= Richard Hayes (Irish politician) =

Irish politician (1878–1958)

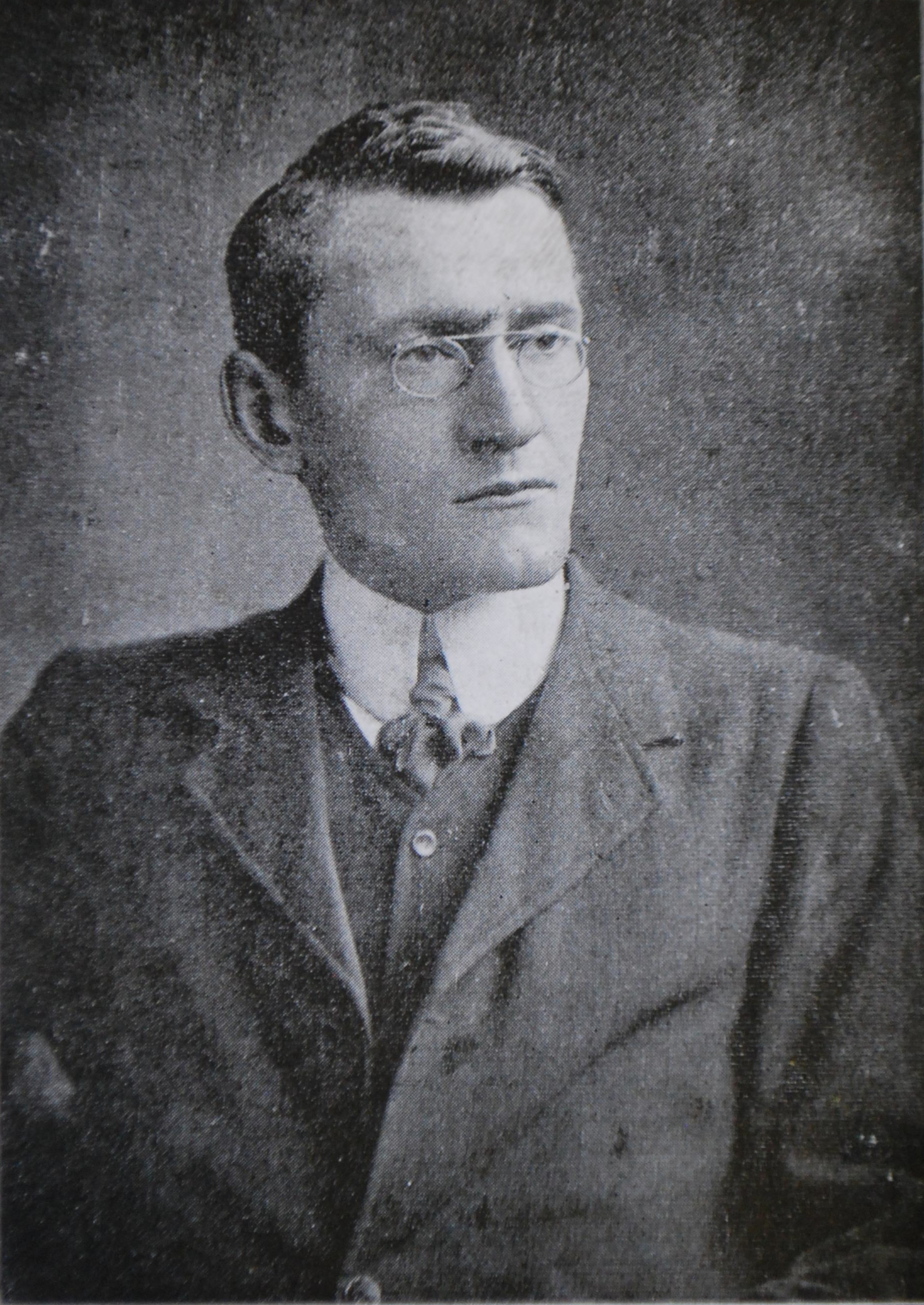
- Hayes, c.1920s

Teachta Dála
- In office August 1923 – January 1924
- Constituency: Limerick
- In office May 1921 – August 1923
- Constituency: Limerick City–Limerick East
- In office December 1918 – May 1921
- Constituency: Limerick East

Personal details
- Born: 1882
- Died: 16 June 1958 (aged 75–76) Dublin, Ireland
- Party: Cumann na nGaedheal
- Other political affiliations: Sinn Féin
- Spouse: Hilda Shaw

British Army military intelligence file for Dr. Richard F. Hayes

Richard Francis Hayes (1882 – 16 June 1958) was an Irish politician, historian and medical doctor. He was a volunteer and fought in the Easter Rising in 1916 and was involved in the Garristown and Ashbourne fighting.

He was elected as a Sinn Féin MP for Limerick East at the 1918 general election. In January 1919, Sinn Féin MPs who had been elected in the Westminster elections of 1918 refused to attend the British House of Commons and instead assembled in the Mansion House, Dublin as a revolutionary parliament called Dáil Éireann. Hayes could not attend as he was imprisoned by the British authorities at the time.

During the War of Independence he was interned in the Curragh Camp. He was elected at the 1921 elections as a Sinn Féin Teachta Dála (TD) for Limerick City–Limerick East and was released after the truce. He supported the Anglo-Irish Treaty and voted in favour of it. He was re-elected at the 1922 general election as a pro-Treaty Sinn Féin TD and subsequently as a Cumann na nGaedheal TD at the 1923 general election.

He resigned from the Dáil in January 1924 and retired from politics. He later became Irish Film Censor (1941–1954) and Director of the Abbey Theatre. As a historian, he was a leading authority on Irish connections with France from the seventeenth to nineteenth centuries. He authored several major historical studies, including The Last Invasion of Ireland: When Connacht Rose (1st ed. 1937), which has been reappraised by Guy Beiner as a groundbreaking book for its use of oral traditions alongside more conventional archival sources. Other titles include Ireland and Irishmen in the French Revolution (1932), Irish Swordsmen of France (1934), Old Irish Links with France (1940), and Biographical Dictionary of Irishmen in France (1949), alongside numerous articles. For his work on the Irish military in France, he received the Légion d'honneur.

He was a hard-working and much-loved doctor. Frank O'Connor records that he deduced, correctly, that their mutual friend George William Russell had terminal cancer simply because Russell (who had moved to England) in a letter to O'Connor complained of what he believed to be colitis. When O'Connor showed Hayes the letter he read it quickly and said "I am sorry but that is cancer, not colitis."

For several years he was the closest friend of Frank O'Connor, who acknowledged the extraordinary help Hayes gave him in researching The Big Fellow, his biography of Michael Collins. After some years, however, the friendship cooled, and the portrait of Hayes in O'Connor's memoir My Father's Son, is surprisingly unflattering, given their earlier closeness.

He is buried in Deansgrange Cemetery.

== Sources ==
- Robert Brennan (1950), Allegiance
- Guy Beiner (2007), Remembering the Year of the French: Irish Folk History and Social Memory (University of Wisconsin Press)
- Ray Bateson (2015), Deansgrange Cemetery and the Easter Rising

Parliament of the United Kingdom
Preceded by Thomas Lundon	Member of Parliament for Limerick East; 1918–1922	Constituency abolished
Oireachtas
New constituency	Teachta Dála for Limerick East; 1918–1921	Constituency abolished

Dáil	Election	Deputy (Party)	Deputy (Party)	Deputy (Party)	Deputy (Party)
2nd	1921	Richard Hayes (SF)	William Hayes (SF)	Kathleen O'Callaghan (SF)	Michael Colivet (SF)
3rd	1922	Richard Hayes (PT-SF)	William Hayes (PT-SF)	Kathleen O'Callaghan (AT-SF)	Michael Colivet (AT-SF)
4th	1923	Constituency abolished. See Limerick			

Dáil	Election	Deputy (Party)	Deputy (Party)	Deputy (Party)	Deputy (Party)	Deputy (Party)	Deputy (Party)	Deputy (Party)
4th	1923	Richard Hayes (CnaG)	James Ledden (CnaG)	Seán Carroll (Rep)	James Colbert (Rep)	John Nolan (CnaG)	Patrick Clancy (Lab)	Patrick Hogan (FP)
4th	1924 by-election	Richard O'Connell (CnaG)	James Ledden (CnaG)	Seán Carroll (Rep)	James Colbert (Rep)	John Nolan (CnaG)	Patrick Clancy (Lab)	Patrick Hogan (FP)
5th	1927 (Jun)	Richard O'Connell (CnaG)	Gilbert Hewson (Ind.)	Tadhg Crowley (FF)	James Colbert (FF)	George C. Bennett (CnaG)	Patrick Clancy (Lab)	Michael Keyes (Lab)
6th	1927 (Sep)	Richard O'Connell (CnaG)	Daniel Bourke (FF)	Tadhg Crowley (FF)	James Colbert (FF)	George C. Bennett (CnaG)	Patrick Clancy (Lab)	John Nolan (CnaG)
7th	1932	James Reidy (CnaG)	Daniel Bourke (FF)	Tadhg Crowley (FF)	James Colbert (FF)	George C. Bennett (CnaG)	Robert Ryan (FF)	John O'Shaughnessy (FP)
8th	1933	James Reidy (CnaG)	Daniel Bourke (FF)	Tadhg Crowley (FF)	Donnchadh Ó Briain (FF)	George C. Bennett (CnaG)	Robert Ryan (FF)	Michael Keyes (Lab)
9th	1937	John O'Shaughnessy (FG)	Daniel Bourke (FF)	Michael Colbert (FF)	Donnchadh Ó Briain (FF)	George C. Bennett (FG)	Robert Ryan (FF)	Michael Keyes (Lab)
10th	1938	James Reidy (FG)	Daniel Bourke (FF)	Tadhg Crowley (FF)	Donnchadh Ó Briain (FF)	George C. Bennett (FG)	Robert Ryan (FF)	Michael Keyes (Lab)
11th	1943	James Reidy (FG)	Daniel Bourke (FF)	Tadhg Crowley (FF)	Donnchadh Ó Briain (FF)	George C. Bennett (FG)	Robert Ryan (FF)	Michael Keyes (Lab)
12th	1944	James Reidy (FG)	Daniel Bourke (FF)	Michael Colbert (FF)	Donnchadh Ó Briain (FF)	George C. Bennett (FG)	Robert Ryan (FF)	Michael Keyes (Lab)
13th	1948	Constituency abolished. See Limerick East and Limerick West						

Dáil	Election	Deputy (Party)	Deputy (Party)	Deputy (Party)
31st	2011	Niall Collins (FF)	Dan Neville (FG)	Patrick O'Donovan (FG)
32nd	2016	Constituency abolished. See Limerick County		
