= Limerick City–Limerick East =

Dáil constituency (1921–1923)

- Former Dáil constituency
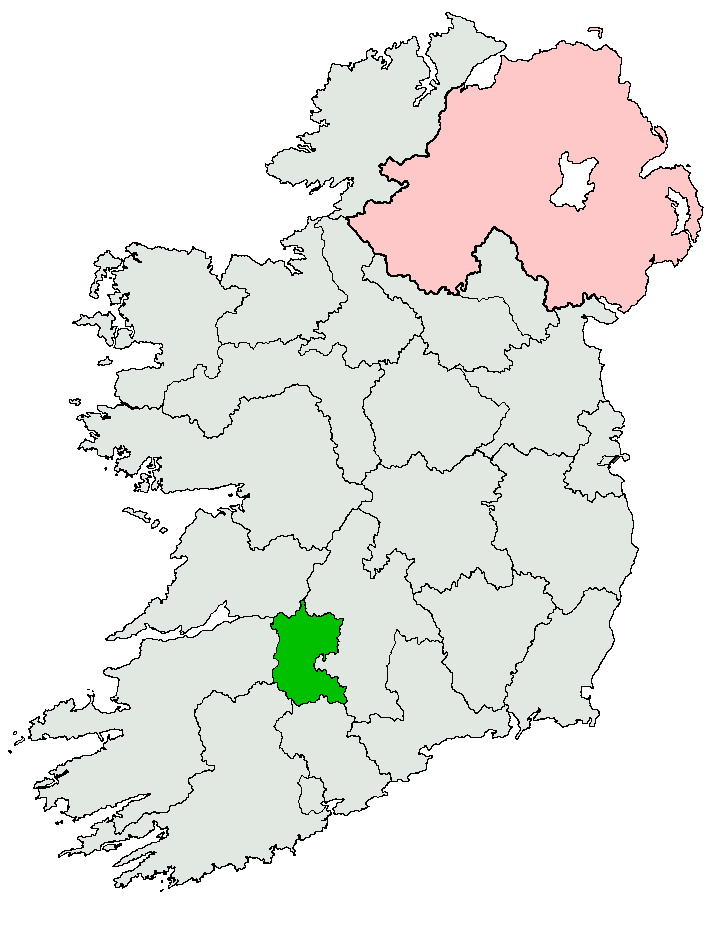
- Location of Limerick City–Limerick East within Ireland

Former constituency
- Created: 1921
- Abolished: 1923
- Seats: 4
- Local government area: County Limerick
- Created from: Limerick City; East Limerick
- Replaced by: Limerick

Limerick City–Limerick East was a parliamentary constituency represented in Dáil Éireann, the lower house of the Oireachtas or Irish Parliament from 1921 to 1923. The constituency elected 4 deputies (Teachtaí Dála, commonly known as TDs) to the Dáil, on the system of proportional representation by means of the single transferable vote (PR-STV).

== History and boundaries ==
The constituency was created by the Government of Ireland Act 1920 and first used at the 1921 general election to the House of Commons of Southern Ireland, whose members formed the Second Dáil. It covered Limerick City and the eastern parts of County Limerick.

It succeeded the United Kingdom House of Commons constituencies of Limerick City and East Limerick which in 1918 were used to elect the members of the 1st Dáil.

It was abolished under the Electoral Act 1923, when it was replaced by the new Limerick constituency which was first used in the 1923 general election for the 4th Dáil.

== TDs ==
Teachtaí Dála (TDs) for Limerick City–Limerick East 1921–1923
Key to parties: SF = Sinn Féin; AT-SF = Sinn Féin (Anti-Treaty); PT-SF = Sinn Féin (Pro-Treaty)
| Dáil | Election | Deputy (Party) | Deputy (Party) | Deputy (Party) | Deputy (Party) |
| 2nd | 1921 | Richard Hayes (SF) | William Hayes (SF) | Kathleen O'Callaghan (SF) | Michael Colivet (SF) |
| 3rd | 1922 | Richard Hayes (PT-SF) | William Hayes (PT-SF) | Kathleen O'Callaghan (AT-SF) | Michael Colivet (AT-SF) |
| 4th | 1923 | Constituency abolished. See Limerick | | | |

Note: The columns in this table are used only for presentational purposes, and no significance should be attached to the order of columns. For details of the order in which seats were won at each election, see the detailed results of that election.

== Elections ==
At both the 1921 general election and the 1922 general election, the number of candidates in Limerick City–Limerick East exactly matched the number of seats. There was therefore no ballot in the constituency on either occasion, and all candidates were returned without a contest.

*: Outgoing TD

=== 1922 general election ===
1922 general election: Limerick City–Limerick East (uncontested)
| Party | Candidate |
|---|---|
| Sinn Féin (Anti-Treaty) | Michael Colivet |
| Sinn Féin (Pro-Treaty) | Richard Hayes |
| Sinn Féin (Pro-Treaty) | William Hayes |
| Sinn Féin (Anti-Treaty) | Kathleen O'Callaghan |
Electorate: 46,991

=== 1921 general election ===
1921 general election: Limerick City–Limerick East (uncontested)
| Party | Candidate |
|---|---|
| Sinn Féin | Michael Colivet |
| Sinn Féin | Richard Hayes |
| Sinn Féin | William Hayes |
| Sinn Féin | Kathleen O'Callaghan |

== See also ==
- Dáil constituencies
- Politics of the Republic of Ireland
- Historic Dáil constituencies
- Elections in the Republic of Ireland
