= Áine =

Irish goddess of summer, wealth, and sovereignty

Áine (Irish pronunciation: [ˈaːnʲə]) is an Irish goddess of summer, wealth, beauty and sovereignty. She is associated with midsummer and the sun, and is sometimes represented by a red mare. She is the daughter of Egobail, the sister of Aillen and/or Fennen, and is claimed as an ancestor by multiple Irish families. As the goddess associated with fertility, she has command over crops and animals and is associated with agriculture.

Áine is associated with County Limerick, where the hill of Knockainey (Irish: Cnoc Áine) is named after her. This hill was the site of rites in her honour, involving fire and the blessing of the land, recorded as recently as 1879. She is also associated with sites such as Toberanna (Irish: Tobar Áine), County Tyrone; Dunany (Irish: Dun Áine), County Louth; Lissan (Irish: Lios Áine), County Londonderry; and Cnoc Áine near Teelin, County Donegal.

== In Irish mythology ==
=== Ailill Aulom ===
The descendants of Aulom, the Eóganachta, claim Áine as an ancestor.

=== Gearóid FitzGerald ===
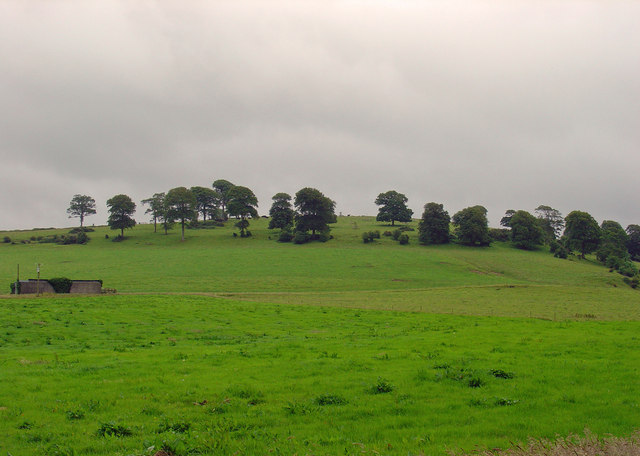
Cnoc Áine (Knockainy Hill) in County Limerick

In other tales Áine is the wife of Gerald FitzGerald, 3rd Earl of Desmond, popularly known as "Iarl Gearóid". Rather than having a consensual marriage, he rapes her, and she exacts revenge by either changing him into a goose, killing him, or both. This is thought to be based on the story of Ailill Aulom. The FitzGeralds thus claim an association with Áine; despite the clan's Norman origins, the FitzGeralds became known for being "more Irish than the Irish themselves".

In a variant of the FitzGerald story, Áine is raped by Gerald's father, the Earl of Desmond, who sees Áine combing her hair while bathing in a river. The Earl takes possession of Áine's cloak, which is the only way to control her, and rapes her. Gerald FitzGerald is the product of this rape. Gerald exhibits certain magical abilities; he can change size dramatically (shrinking to jump into a bottle), and can transform into a goose, which he does at Lough Gur near Cnoc Áine. After Gerald's father dies, Áine and Gerald inherit his land. Áine enchants the hillside of Cnoc Áine, causing peas to grow there miraculously overnight. In some versions of the story, Gerald is the king of the Sídhfir, is bound to a pillar in Loch Guirr, and according to Munster prophecy, will one day rise from the Loch mounted on a black steed with a white face to engage in combat during the final war.

=== Manannán mac Lir ===
In yet other versions of her myth, Áine is the wife or daughter of the sea god Manannán mac Lir.

== Oral folklore ==
In folklore from County Limerick, Áine is said to have two daughters whom she admonished never to marry. The first daughter disobeys her, and on her wedding night Áine finds her son-in-law eating the breast off her daughter. Áine forces her younger daughter to witness the horror and reinforces her warning about disobeying her mother, but the younger daughter soon elopes with a druid. Áine then shuts herself into her house as a recluse and will commune only with the Sidhe. She dies of grief on Saint John's Eve, and the good folk assemble in great masses bearing torches. It is said that from this time on cliars were carried in the fields on Saint John's Eve.

In other folklore from County Limerick, Áine is said to have lived in a fort in Cnoc Áine long ago. A woman gathered ash sticks from the fort, and Áine told her to put them back exactly as they were; when the woman failed to do so, Áine abducted her, carrying her into the fort. Áine is described as having long, flowing hair.

In another folktale, Áine is said to live at the bottom of a lake. Each year she emerges at midsummer to sit in her favorite spot, Suidheachán Bean-a'-tighe, where she combs her long golden hair with a golden comb. A young shepherd watches her from afar, and after she falls asleep he steals her comb. Every misfortune visits him after that, but before he dies, he requests that the comb be thrown back into the lake.

People in Limerick once brought their sick to the lakes on the sixth night of the full moon (called "All-Heal"), when it shone brightly on the water. They believed that if the sick were not healed by the eighth or ninth night, Áine would sing or play the Ceol Sidhe, which was used to comfort the dying. Áine's red-haired dwarf brother Fer Fí, a harper, would then sing the Suantraige, the song that lulled the dead to sleep.

In The Legend of Seán Ó hAodh, the herdsman piper Seán Ó hAodh meets Áine, clothed in fine white robes, near Lough Gur in August, and she asks him to play at a ball. She meets Seán in a splendid horse-drawn carriage, and they travel over a long road laden with roses and fruit trees. When they arrive at Áine's mansion, Seán plays the pipes before fine ladies and gentlemen until the early morning hours, but when the sun rises, he sees fish shoaling outside the windows and realizes he is at the bottom of Lough Gur. At the end of the evening, the ladies and gentlemen give Seán guineas, Áine gives him a gold purse, and he falls asleep. He reawakens on Suidheachán Bean-a'-tighe to find that all the guineas have turned to gorse but that the gold purse is still there and never runs empty.

== Festivals ==
The feast of Midsummer Night was held in Áine's honor. In County Limerick, she is remembered in more recent times as Queen of the Fae. On Saint John's Eve, men gathered on Cnoc Áine, where she was said to dwell, where they lit clíars—bunches of straw and hay tied on poles—that were carried in procession to the hilltop. Later, the men ran with the clíars through their fields and between cattle to bring good luck for the rest of the year. Men from neighboring villages were said to be required to look to the moon as they approached the hill to avoid forgetting their homes.

Áine is spoken of as "the best hearted woman that ever lived", and the meadowsweet or queen-of-the-meadow is said to be her plant.

== Related goddesses ==
Áine (Ir. "brightness, glow, joy, radiance; splendour, glory, fame") is sometimes mistakenly equated with Danu, whose name bears a superficial resemblance to Anu.

"Aynia", reputedly the most powerful fairy in Ulster, may be a variant of Áine. Áine's hill is in the heart of Cnoc Áine (Knockainy) in County Limerick.

Grian (literally, "sun") is believed to be either the sister of Áine, another of Áine's manifestations, or possibly "Macha in disguise". Due to Áine's connection with midsummer rites, it is possible that Áine and Grian share a dual-goddess, seasonal function (as in the Gaelic myths of the Cailleach and Brigid) with the two sisters representing the "two suns" of the year, Áine representing the light half of the year and the bright summer sun (an ghrian mhór), and Grian the dark half of the year and the pale winter sun (an ghrian bheag). Grian's name literally means "the sun" in modern Irish, but her name derives from the Proto-Indo European word *g^{wh}er-, meaning "to be hot" or "to burn", unlike the words for "sun" in other Indo-European languages.

== See also ==
- List of solar deities
- Aibell
- Clíodhna
- Mongfind

== Bibliography ==
- Byrne, Francis John, Irish Kings and High-Kings. Four Courts Press. 2nd revised edition, 2001.
- Ellis, Peter Berresford, Dictionary of Celtic Mythology(Oxford Paperback Reference), Oxford University Press, (1994): ISBN 0-19-508961-8
- MacKillop, James. Dictionary of Celtic Mythology. Oxford: Oxford University Press, 1998. ISBN 0-19-280120-1.
- O hOgain, Daithi "Myth, Legend and Romance: An Encyclopedia of the Irish Folk Tradition" Prentice Hall Press, (1991) : ISBN 0-13-275959-4 (the only dictionary/encyclopedia with source references for every entry)
- Wood, Juliette, The Celts: Life, Myth, and Art, Thorsons Publishers (2002): ISBN 0-00-764059-5
