= Máirtín Standún =

- Born: 9 April 1918
- Died: 15 December 1994 (aged 76); Ireland
- Occupation: Businessman

Máirtín Standún (1918–1994) was an Irish Republican.

== Biography ==
Standún (born 1918) was born and raised in Liverpool. He joined the Gaelic League in the city "aged sixteen or seventeen, determined to learn Irish." He subsequently joined the Irish Republican Army (1922–1969) "and was sort of hounded by the police for a while. So I eventually came to Ireland in the summer of 1939." He worked in Dublin until May 1940 when he was interned, been released in 1943.

He married May Mulready of Mullingar and they moved to Spiddal where in 1946, they founded a department store named Standun which has turned into an attraction on the Galway tourist trail.
