= Máirtín Chóilín Choilmín Seoighe =

Máirtín Chóilín Choilmín Seoighe is the last living inhabitant of Inish Barra, Connemara.

Seoighe is the great-grandson of Patrick Joyce of Mhám Toirc (see Maumturks), who was the first of the family to live on the island. At that time, there were forty-two families on Inish Barra. By 1966, there were only three.

Seoighe was one of eleven children, and emigrated to England at the age of 18. He spent the next fourteen years between there and Inish Barra. He eventually returned, and took over the family farm, for a time building curraghs. As of 2001, he was the last inhabitant of the island.
