= Coonagh (barony) =

Barony (historical administrative unit) in County Limerick, Ireland

Coonagh Uí Chuanach (Irish)
- Barony
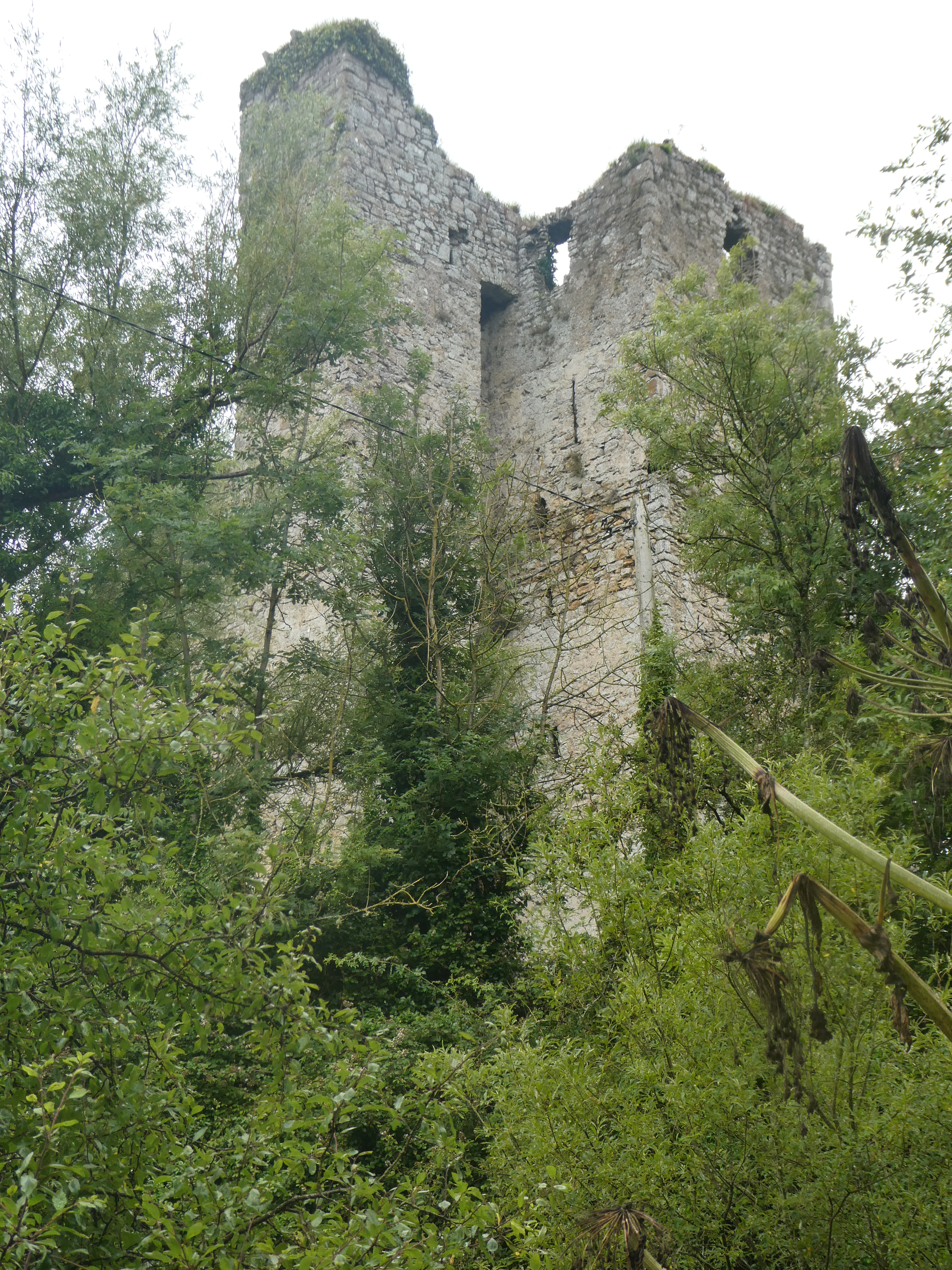
- Coonagh Castle, near Doon, County Limerick

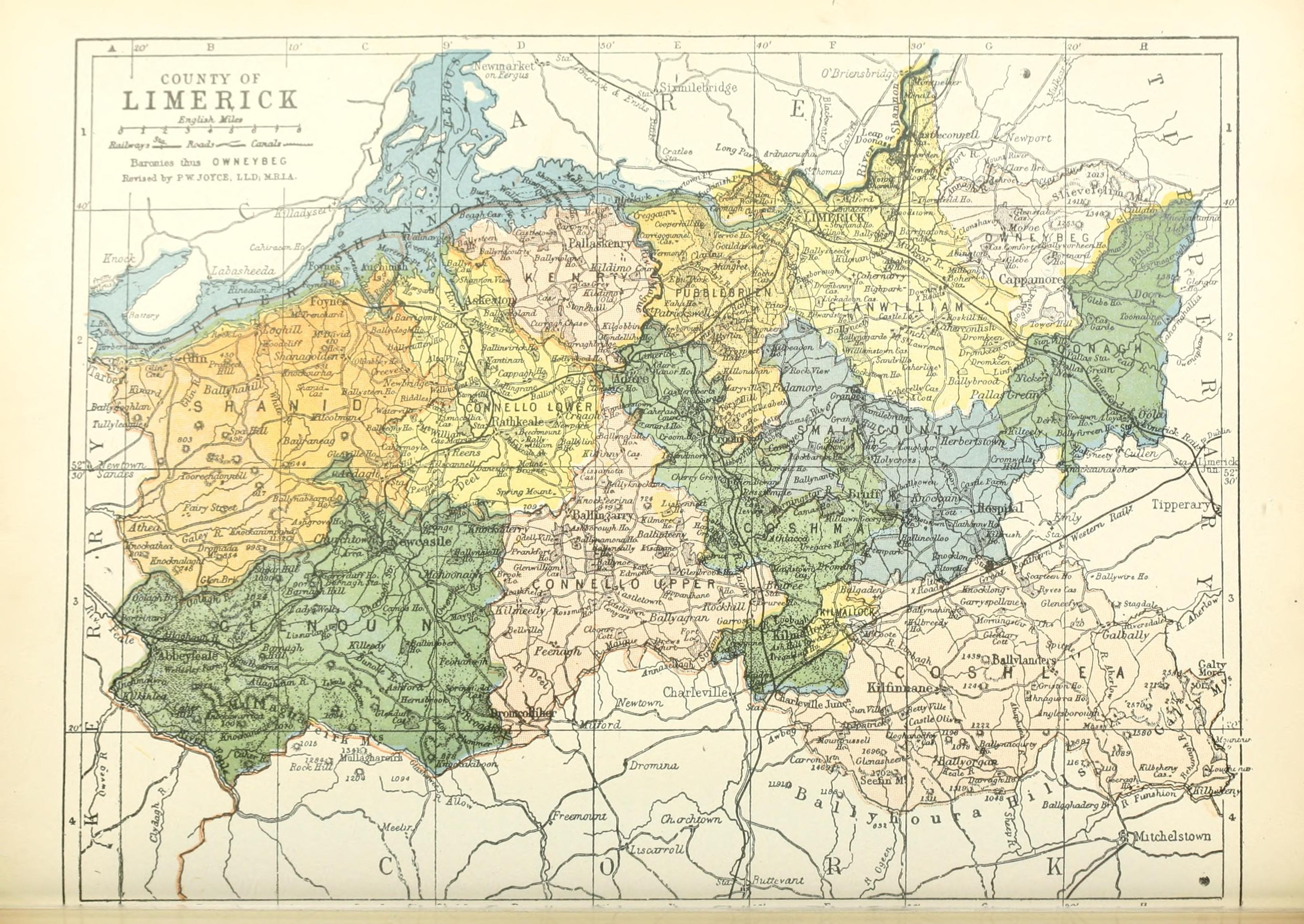
- Barony map of County Limerick, 1900; Coonagh is in the northeast, coloured green.

- Location within Ireland
- Coordinates: 52°34′N 8°17′W
- Sovereign state: Ireland
- Province: Munster
- County: Limerick

Area
  - Total: 147.0 km^{2} (56.8 sq mi)

Coonagh (Irish: Uí Chuanach "descendants of Cuana") is a barony in the northeast of County Limerick in Ireland. The towns of Cappamore, Kilteely, Doon, and Oola are in the barony.
