= Máirtín Ó Murchú =

Máirtín Ó Murchú was an Irish professor of Celtic studies and emeritus professor of the Dublin Institute for Advanced Studies. He previously also was Director of the School of Celtic at DIAS and a Professor of Irish at Trinity College Dublin.

He published widely on Irish and Scottish Gaelic linguistics and the Irish language in general, such as the handbook on the state of the Irish language (co-authored with Helen Ó Murchú) for the European Bureau for Lesser-Used Languages or the section on Irish in Blackwell's Encyclopedia of the Languages of Europe

He was also fundamental in the development of a standard pronunciation for Irish, the Lárchanúint, in particular his 1969 article Common Core and Underlying Forms which has been described as ground-breaking.

== Publications ==
One of his key publications in Scottish Gaelic studies was East Perthshire Gaelic: Social History, Phonology, Texts and Lexicon on the now defunct Scottish Gaelic dialect of East Perthshire.

Other academic works include:

- (1985) The Irish Language. Dept. of Foreign Affairs/Bord na Gaeilge
- (1993) "Aspects of the Societal Status of Modern Irish" in The Celtic Languages; edited by Martin J. Ball with James Fife. (Routledge Language Family Descriptions.) London: Routledge
- (2000) "An Ghaeltacht mar réigiún cultúrtha: léargas teangeolaíoch" in Teanga, pobal agus réigiún; eagarthóirí: Liam Mac Mathúna, Ciarán Mac Murchaidh agus Máirín Nic Eoin. Baile Átha Cliath: Coiscéim
- (2002) Ag Dul ó Chion: Cás na Gaeilge 1952-2002. (An aimsir óg. 1. Paimflead.) Baile Átha Cliath: Coiscéim
- (2005) Dineen and Ó Donaill in Dinneen and the Dictionary; edited by Pádraigín Riggs. London: Irish Texts Society
