= Coshma =

Barony in County Limerick, Ireland

Coshma Cois Máighe (Irish)
- Barony
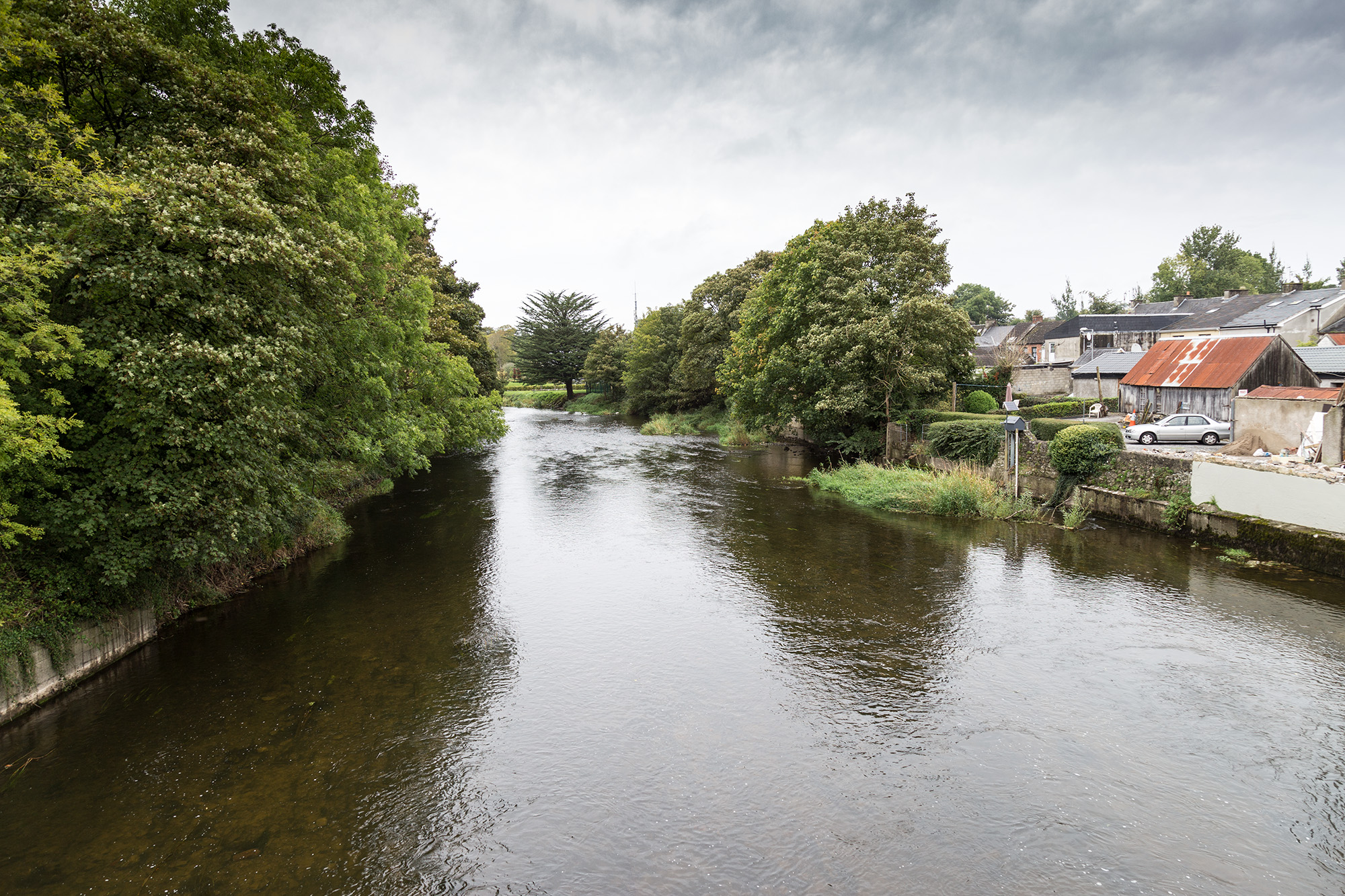
- The River Maigue in Croom

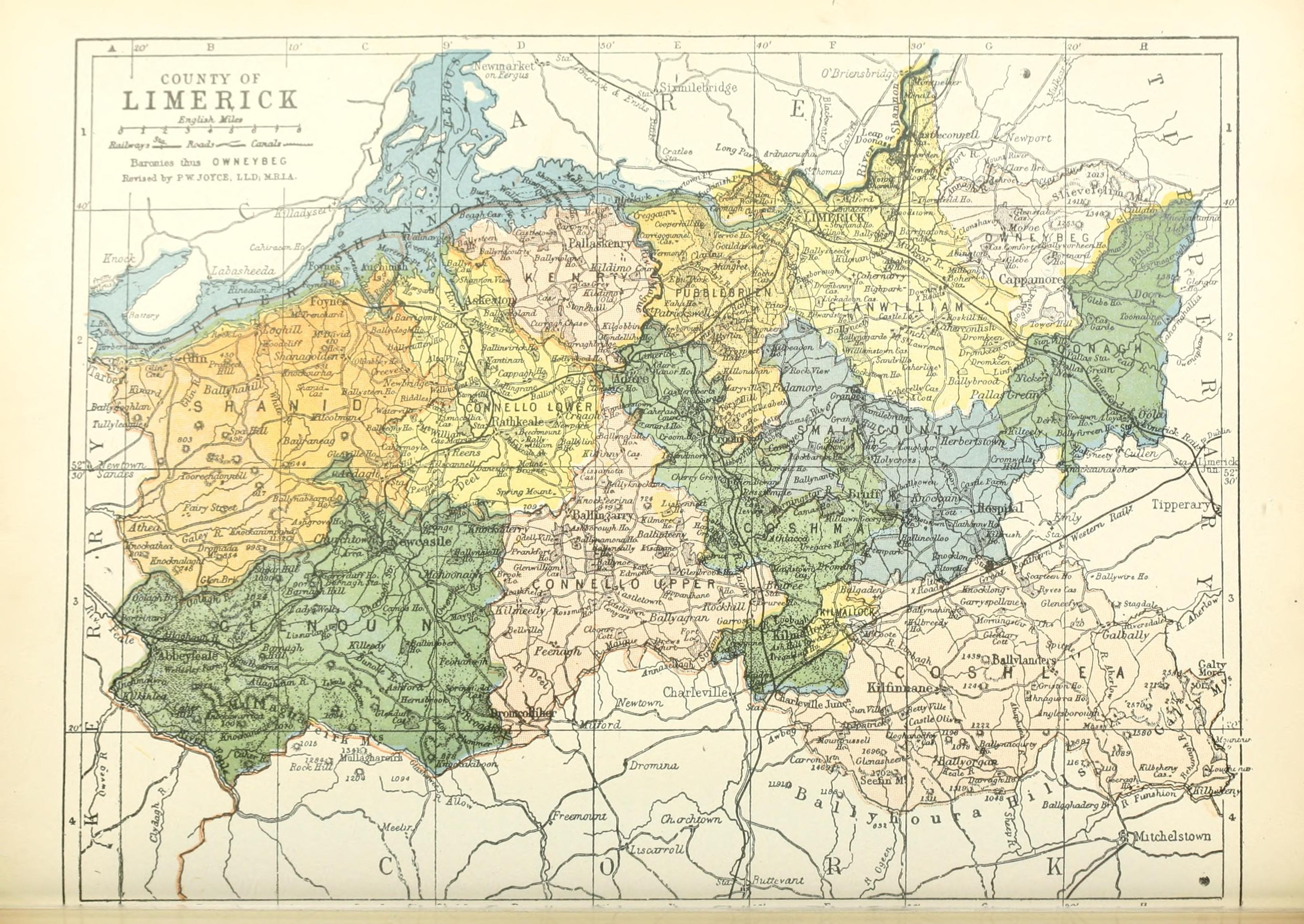
- Barony map of County Limerick, 1900; Coshma is in the middle, coloured green.

- Location within Ireland
- Coordinates: 52°28′N 8°40′W
- Sovereign state: Ireland
- Province: Munster
- County: Limerick

Area
  - Total: 198.4 km^{2} (76.6 sq mi)

Coshma (Irish: Cois Máighe) is a historical barony in southeast County Limerick, Ireland.

Baronies were mainly cadastral rather than administrative units. They acquired modest local taxation and spending functions in the 19th century before being superseded by the Local Government (Ireland) Act 1898.

== History ==
The Uí Fidgenti were the dominant Irish kingdom in the Coshma region. The Uí Conaill Gabhra (Hy Cnocnuil Gabhra) were in the area and were part of the Eóganachta. The Ó Cinnfhaolaidh (O'Kinealy, O'Kenealy) were chiefs of Eoganacht Grian Guara which included Coshma and the barony of Smallcounty. Before the Norman conquest the Ó Cleirchín (O'Clerkin, Clerk, Cleary) were in Coshma as Lords of the Uí Fidgenti and of Ui-Cairbre.

Coshma was known as a centre of Irish-language poetry, with the Maigue poets being nationally famous. Aindrias Mac Craith wrote of the area as Cois Máigh na gCaor, "Coshma of the berries," in his poem "Slán le Máigh" ('Farewell to the Maigue'). Mannix Joyce also wrote about the Coshma region and its literature.

== Geography ==
Coshma is in the middle of the county, going along the River Maigue; the Irish name means "banks of the Maigue."

== List of settlements ==
Settlements within the historical barony of Coshma include:

- Adare
- Bruff
- Croom
- Effin
