= Coshlea =

Barony in County Limerick, Ireland

Coshlea Irish: Cois Sléibhe
- Barony
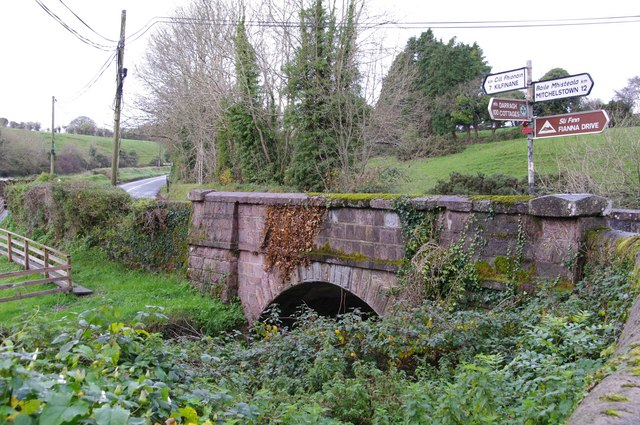
- The Darragh Bridge, Ballynacourty

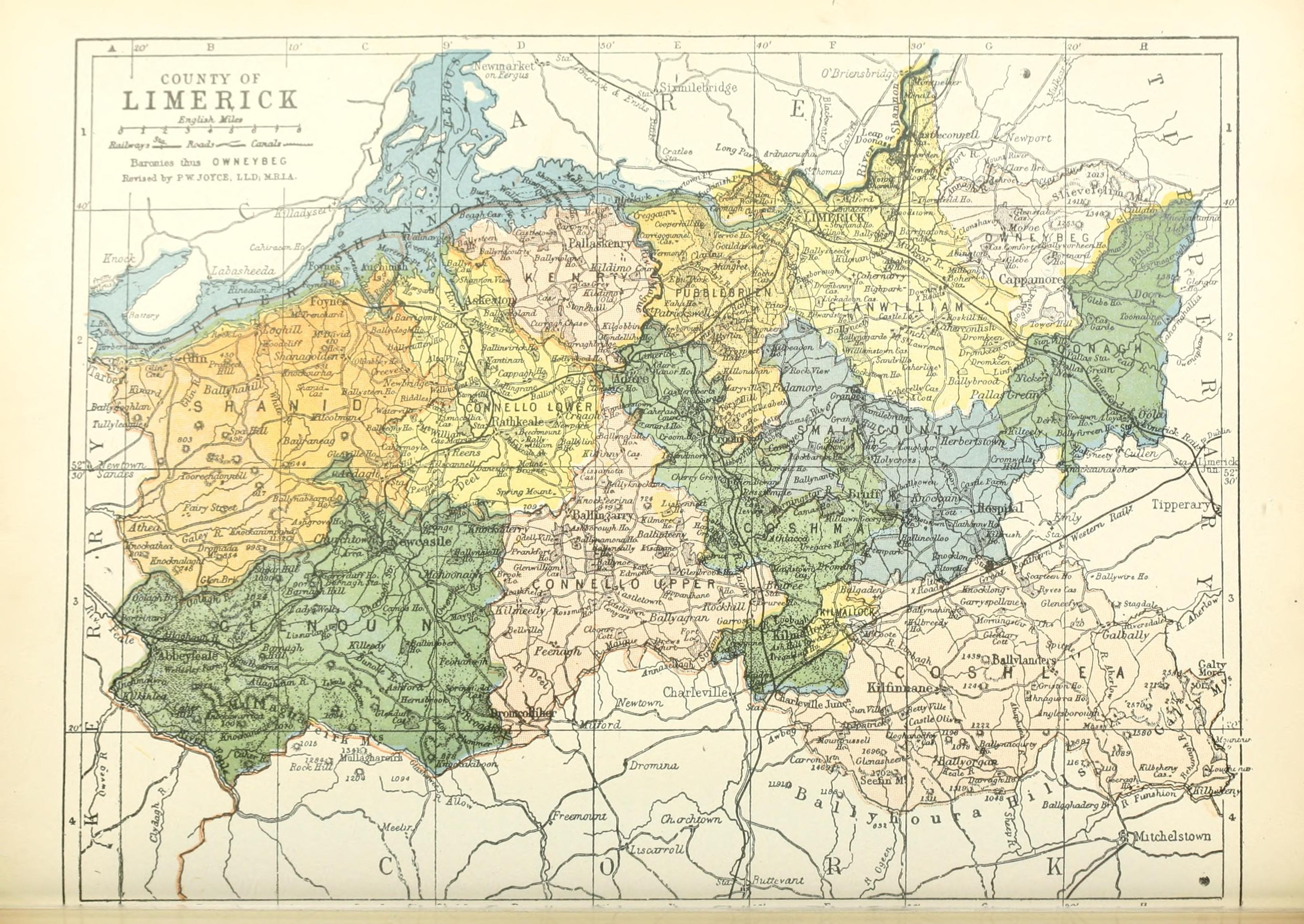
- Barony map of County Limerick, 1900; Coshlea is in the southeast, coloured peach.

- Location within Ireland
- Coordinates: 52°22′N 8°24′W
- Sovereign state: Ireland
- Province: Munster
- County: Limerick

Area
  - Total: 385.4 km^{2} (148.8 sq mi)

Coshlea (Irish: Cois Sléibhe; sometimes given as Costlea) is a historical barony in southeast County Limerick, Ireland.

Baronies were mainly cadastral rather than administrative units. They acquired modest local taxation and spending functions in the 19th century before being superseded by the Local Government (Ireland) Act 1898.

== History ==
The Ó hAodha (O'Hea or Hayes) were kings of a region known as Muscraidhe Luachra ("mountains of Muskerry").

The name is still used in the modern day by the Kilfinane Coshlea Historical Society, and by the Gaelic games team Coshlea Gaels (a union of Staker Wallace GAA and Effin GAA).

== Geography ==
Coshlea is in the southeast of the county, to the north of the Ballyhoura Hills and Galtee Mountains, hence the placename, which means "foot of the mountain." The River Aherlow, River Loobagh and Awbeg flow through it. Some sources give it as Cois Laoi, "bank of the (River) Lee", but that makes no sense as it is nowhere near the Lee.

== List of settlements ==
Settlements within the historical barony of Coshlea include:

- Anglesborough
- Ardpatrick
- Ballylanders
- Galbally
- Garryspillane
- Kilbehenny
- Kilfinane
- Knocklong
