= Pubblebrien =

Barony in County Limerick, Ireland

Pubblebrien Pobal Bhriain (Irish)
- Barony
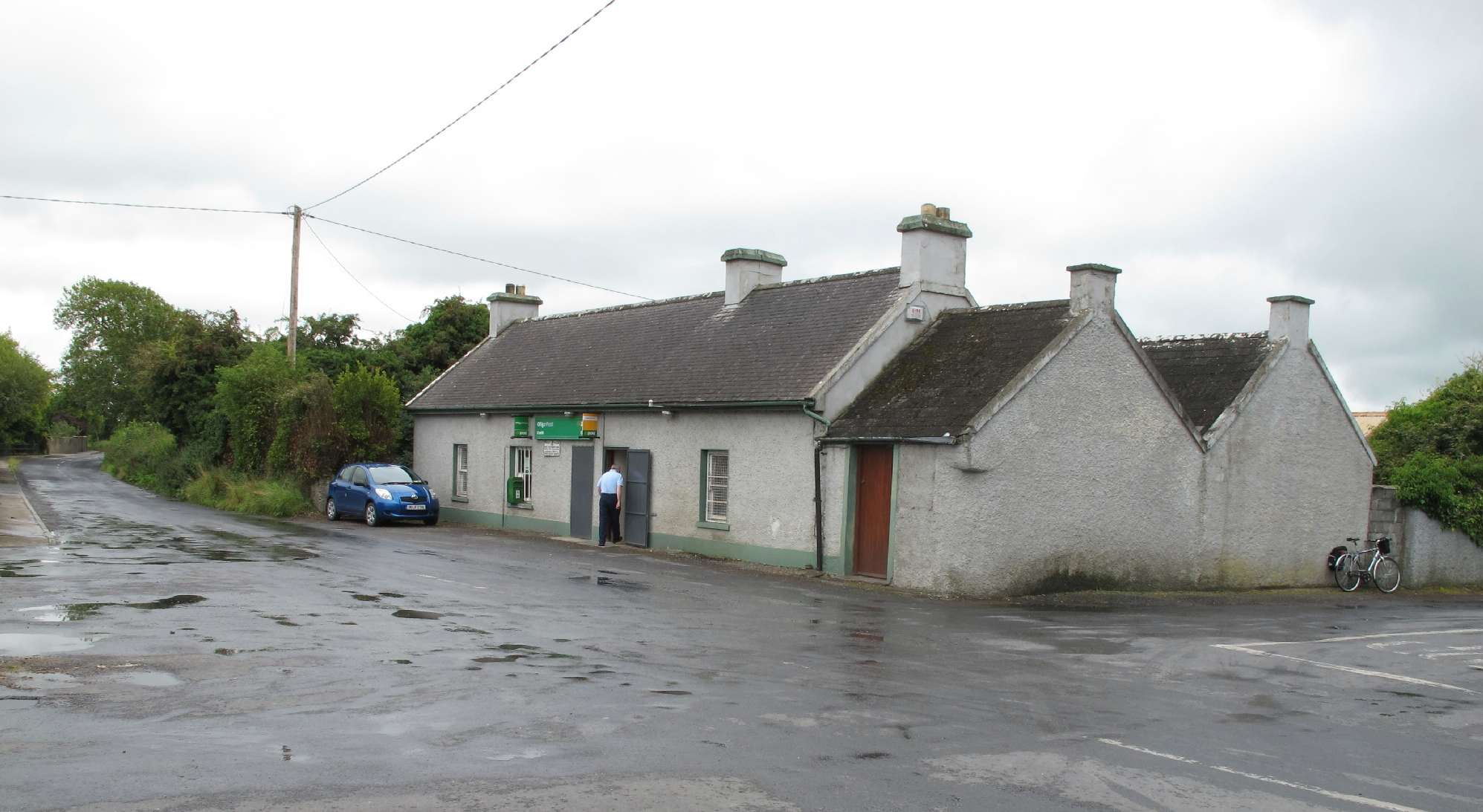
- Post office in Crecora

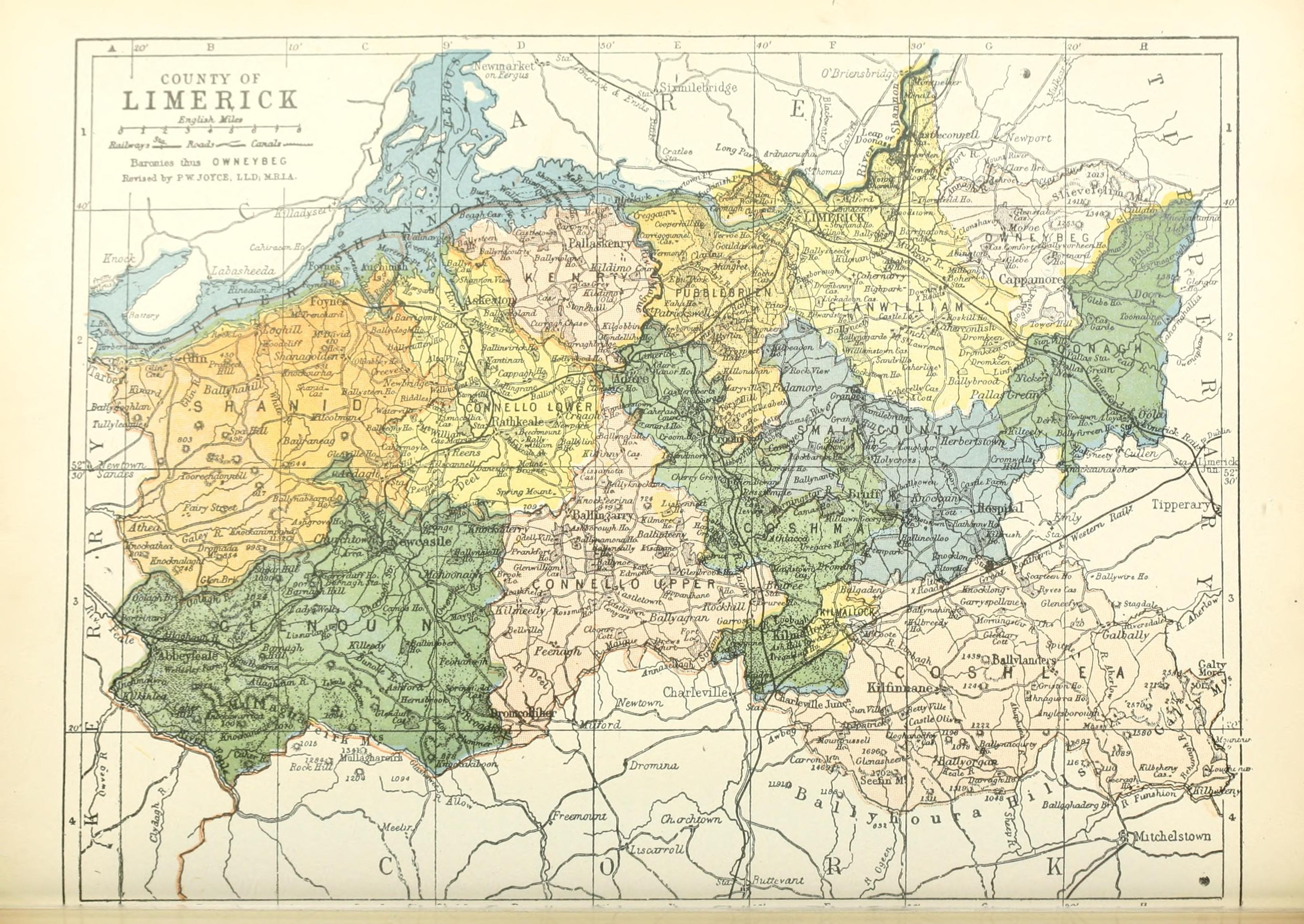
- Barony map of County Limerick, 1900; Pubblebrien is in the north-centre, coloured orange.

- Location within Ireland
- Coordinates: 52°35′N 8°41′W
- Sovereign state: Ireland
- Province: Munster
- County: Limerick

Area
  - Total: 122.0 km^{2} (47.1 sq mi)

Pubblebrien (Irish: Pobal Bhriain) is a historical barony in northern County Limerick, Ireland.

Baronies were mainly cadastral rather than administrative units. They acquired modest local taxation and spending functions in the 19th century before being superseded by the Local Government (Ireland) Act 1898.

== History ==
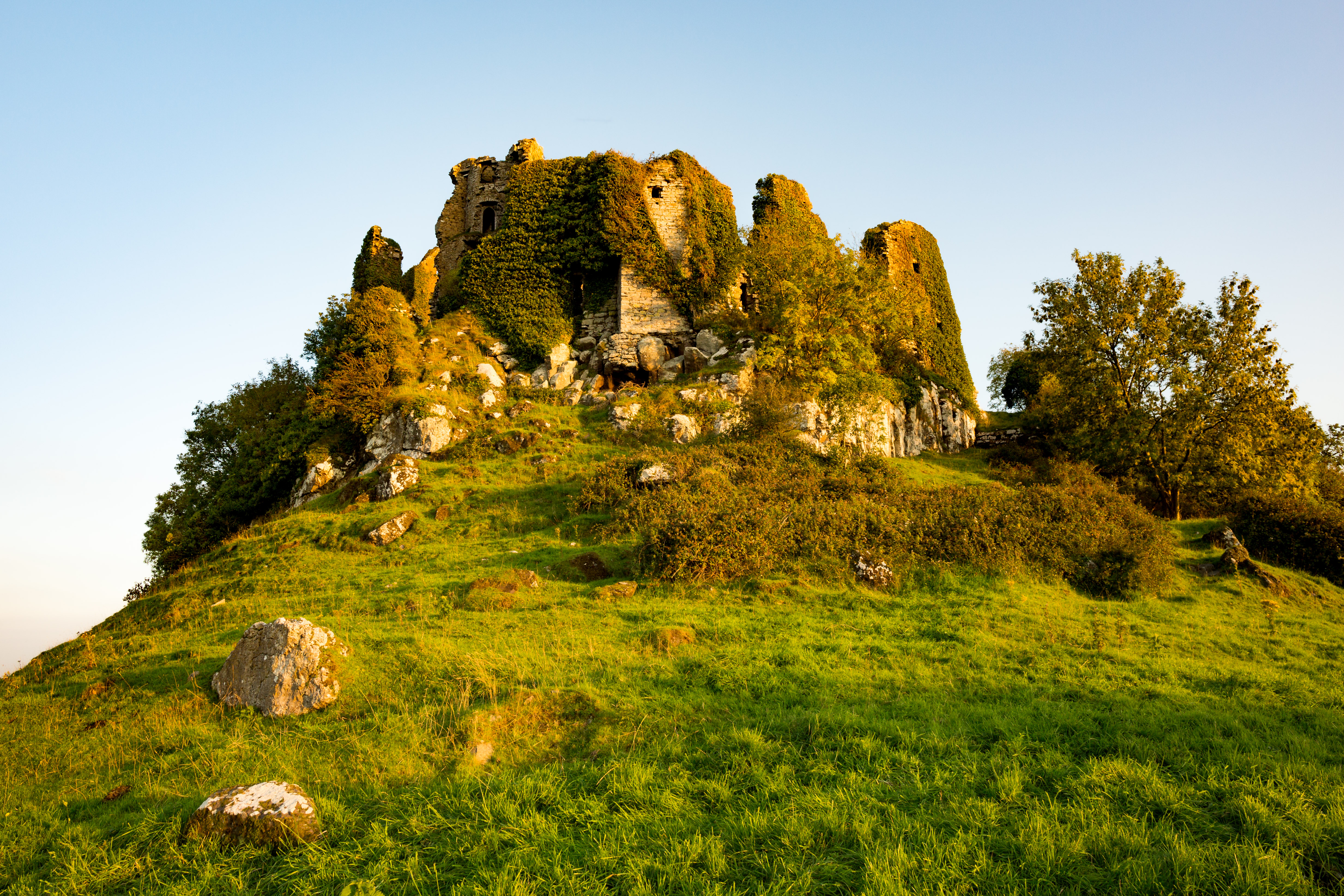
The castle at Carrigogunnell

Carrigogunnell was the ancient centre of the area. It was ruled by the Ó Ciarmhaic (Kerwicks), a cantred of the Eóganachta, until it fell to the Mac Uí Bhrian (Mac Brien), a branch of the O'Brien dynasty, hence the name Pubblebrien ("Brian's people," referring to Brian Boru). The MacSheehy and O'Hallinans had a seat at Ballyallinan Castle; the MacSheehys (Mac Síthigh) were gallowglasses (soldier-clients from Scotland) who arrived in the Ireland in the 14th century and were in Connacht from the 15th century as bodyguards to the Fitzgerald Earls of Desmond. The MacArthur and O'Scanlan clans also held land in Pubblebrien.

The Cromwellian adventurer William Peacock received 840 acres (3.4 km^{2}) in Pubblebrien after the Cromwellian conquest of Ireland.

Máirtín Ó Murchú noted the rapid decline in Irish speakers in Pubblebrien, from 100% in those born 1791–1801 to 3% in those born 1851–61 (i.e. after the Famine).

In 2002 a local history, Pubblebrien Journal, was published by the Pubblebrien Historical Society.

== Geography ==
Pubblebrien is in the north-centre of the county, east of the River Maigue, west of Limerick city and south of the Shannon.

== List of settlements ==
Settlements within the historical barony of Pubblebrien include:

- Clarina
- Crecora
- Dooradoyle
- Mungret
- Patrickswell
