= List of national monuments in County Limerick =

The Irish state has officially approved the following list of national monuments in County Limerick. In the Republic of Ireland, a structure or site may be deemed to be a "national monument", and therefore worthy of state protection, if it is of national importance. If the land adjoining the monument is essential to protect it, this land may also be protected.

== National Monuments ==
NM#	Monument name	Description	Image	Townland	Location
212	Kilmallock Abbey	Friary (Dominican)		Abbeyfarm	52°24′09″N 8°34′30″W
622	Desmond Castle	Castle		Adare	52°34′10″N 8°46′56″W
201	Askeaton Castle	Castle		Askeaton	52°36′00″N 8°58′26″W
625	Ballylanders fort	Ringfort		Ballylanders	52°22′51″N 8°21′09″W
247	Lough Gur	Enclosure		Bruff	52°30′51″N 8°32′31″W
247	Lough Gur Tomb	Megalithic Tomb unclassified		Lough Gur	52°30′31″N 8°31′55″W
85	Mungret Churches	Three Churches		Baunacloka, Dromdarrig	52°38′04″N 8°40′32″W
194	Hospital Church	Church (Knights Hospitallers)		Barrysfarm	52°28′34″N 8°25′57″W
83	Dísert Óengusa	Early Medieval Hermitage		Carrigeen (Croom)	52°31′15″N 8°44′41″W
636, 582	Desmond Hall and Castle	Medieval Castle Complex		Newcastlewest	52°27′00″N 9°03′42″W
84	Clonkeen Church	Church		Clonkeen (Barrington)	52°38′38″N 8°27′36″W
345	Killeen Cowpark	Church		Cowpark	52°36′29″N 8°53′38″W
663	Cush Earthworks	Earthworks		Cush	52°22′52″N 8°26′34″W
315	Duntryleague passage tomb	Passage Tomb		Deerpark (Duntryleague)	52°24′23″N 8°19′21″W
555	Rathard	Ringfort		Garryheakin	52°31′03″N 8°18′24″W
341	Killulta Church	Church		Glennameade	52°37′45″N 8°50′10″W
268	Glenquin Castle	Castle		Killeedy	52°23′02″N 9°06′25″W
247	Lough Gur Stone Circle	Stone Circle (potential)		Lough Gur	52°30′55″N 8°32′29″W
247	Lough Gur Standing Stone	Standing Stone		Lough Gur	52°31′02″N 8°32′23″W
247	Grange stone circle	Embanked Stone Circle		Grange	52°30′51″N 8°32′30″W
247	The Spectacles	House sites & field system		Lough Gur	52°31′26″N 8°31′17″W
247	Crock Island	Crannóg		Grange	52°31′12″N 8°32′16″W
247	Lough Gur Megalithic Structure	Megalithic Structure		Lough Gur	
680	Kilmallock Medieval House	Medieval House		Abbeyfarm (Kilmallock)	52°24′02″N 8°34′23″W
408	Collegiate Church of SS Peter & Paul	Church		Killmallock	52°24′04″N 8°34′29″W
173	King John's Castle	Castle		Kilmallock	52°24′05″N 8°34′36″W
538	Kilmihill Ringfort	Ringfort		Kilmihil (Ballingarry)	52°27′31″N 8°50′49″W
247	Lough Gur Cemetery	Cairn		Lough Gur	52°30′39″N 8°31′39″W
247	Lough Gur Ringfort	Ringfort		Lough Gur	
576	De Valera's Cottage	House with historic associations		Knockmore	52°26′01″N 8°39′25″W
86	Killaliathan Church (Killagholehane church, Our Lady of the Snows)	Church		Lacka Lower	52°19′54″N 8°58′38″W
366	Kilrush Church	Church		Limerick	52°39′39″N 8°39′19″W
288	King John's Castle	Castle		Limerick	52°40′11″N 8°37′32″W
383	Fanning's Castle	Castle		Limerick (Creagh Lane)	52°40′02″N 8°37′19″W
247	Lough Gur House	Prehistoric House Site		Lough Gur	
247	Lough Gur Wedge Tomb	Wedge Tomb		Lough Gur	
247	Knockadoon	Prehistoric Habitation		Lough Gur	
247	Carraig Aille	Enclosure		Lough Gur	
247	Lough Gur Cemetery Mound	Cemetery Mound		Lough Gur	
247	Leagun	Standing Stone		Lough Gur	
185	Askeaton Abbey	Friary (Franciscan)		Moig South	52°36′14″N 8°58′31″W
171	Monasteranenagh Abbey	Abbey (Cistercian)		Monaster South	52°31′01″N 8°39′46″W
459	Ardagh Fort	Ringfort		Reerasta South	52°29′37″N 9°04′05″W

== Sources ==
- National Monuments in County Limerick
