= Robert Cleary =

Robert Cleary may refer to:

- Robert E. Cleary (1931–2018), Sergeant Major of the Marine Corps
- Robert J. Cleary (born 1955), United States Attorney for the District of New Jersey and lead prosecutor in the Unabomber case
- Bob Cleary (Robert Barry Cleary, 1936–2015), retired ice hockey player
- Robert Cleary (priest) (died 1918), Archdeacon of Emly
- Robbie Cleary (born 2003), Canadian soccer player

== See also ==
- Robert Clary (1926–2022), French-American actor well known for his role on Hogan's Heroes
