= King John's Castle =

King John's Castle may refer to:

- King John's Castle (Limerick), Limerick City, Ireland
- King John's Castle (Carlingford), County Louth, Ireland
- King John's Castle (Kilmallock), County Limerick, Ireland
- King John's Castle in Kineton, Warwickshire, United Kingdom
- King John's Castle, a horse that finished second in the 2008 Grand National

== See also ==
- Athenry, County Galway
- Naas, County Kildare
- Odiham Castle near Odiham, Hampshire
- Trim Castle, County Meath
