= King John's Castle (Kilmallock) =

- Caisleán an Rí (Irish)
- King's Castle
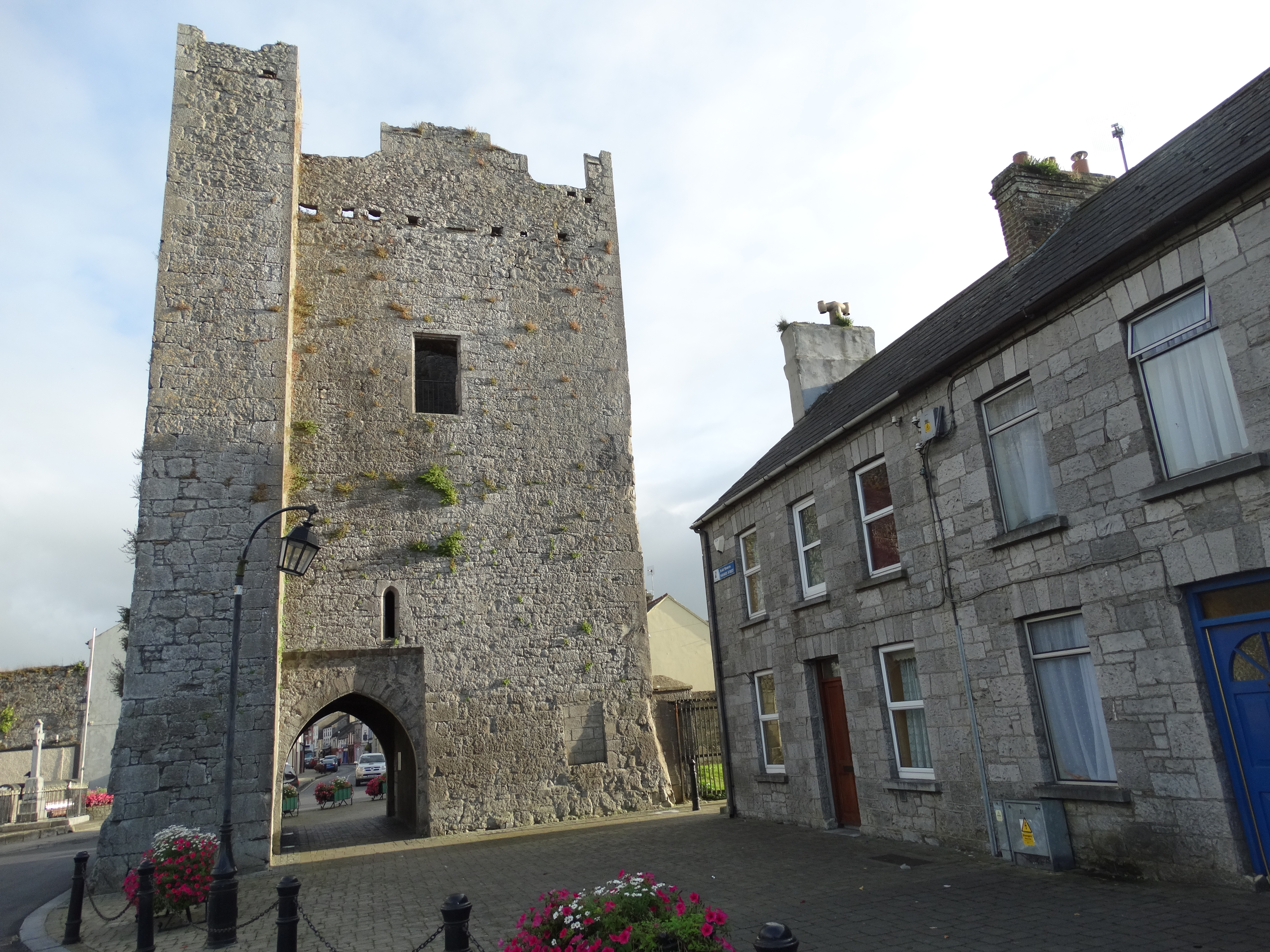

- Location within Ireland
- 52.401336°N 8.576692°W
- Type: tower house/peel tower
- Location: Sarsfield Street, Kilmallock, County Limerick, Ireland

History
- Built: 15th century

Site notes
- Owner: State

National monument of Ireland
- Official name: King John's Castle
- Reference no.: 173

King John's Castle or King's Castle is a tower house and National Monument located in Kilmallock, Ireland.

== Location ==
King John's Castle is located in Kilmallock, 137 m (449 ft) west of the Collegiate Church of St Peter and St Paul and 152 m (499 ft) southwest of Kilmallock Abbey.

== History ==
Despite the name, the tower house (or peel tower) was not erected during King John's reign (1177–1216) but some time in the 15th century. The name is probably intended to invite comparison to King John's Castle, Limerick.

There are some original mullioned windows still present but most were replaced with 18th-century windows.

It was granted to Henry Billingsley in 1588, and to Thomas Browne in 1604. In 1645 it was used as an arsenal by James Tuchet, 3rd Earl of Castlehaven's troops during the Irish Confederate Wars, and was a military hospital in 1651.

The tower was renovated in the 18th/19th century and was used as a blacksmith's workshop.

== Building ==
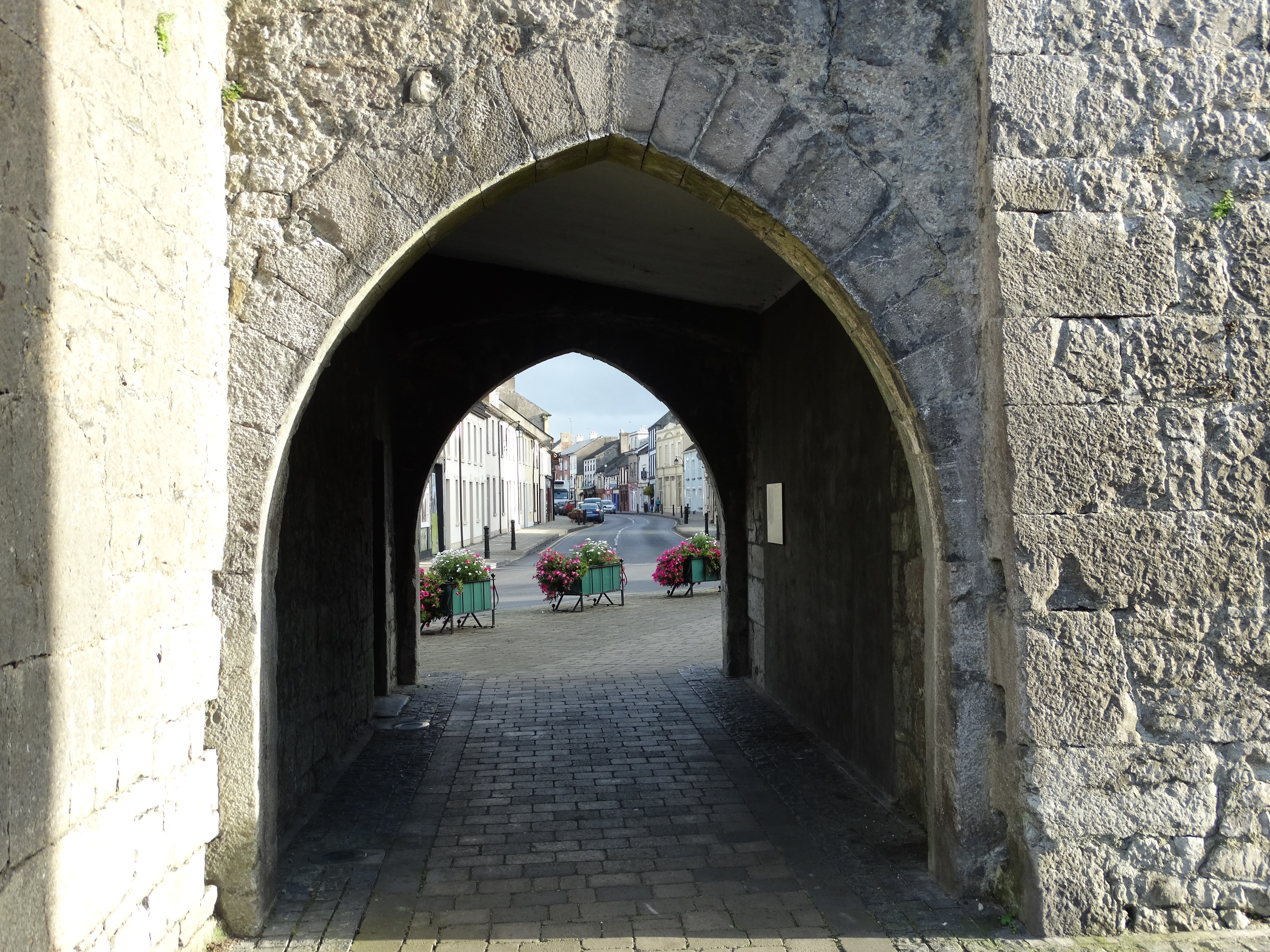
Archway through the tower

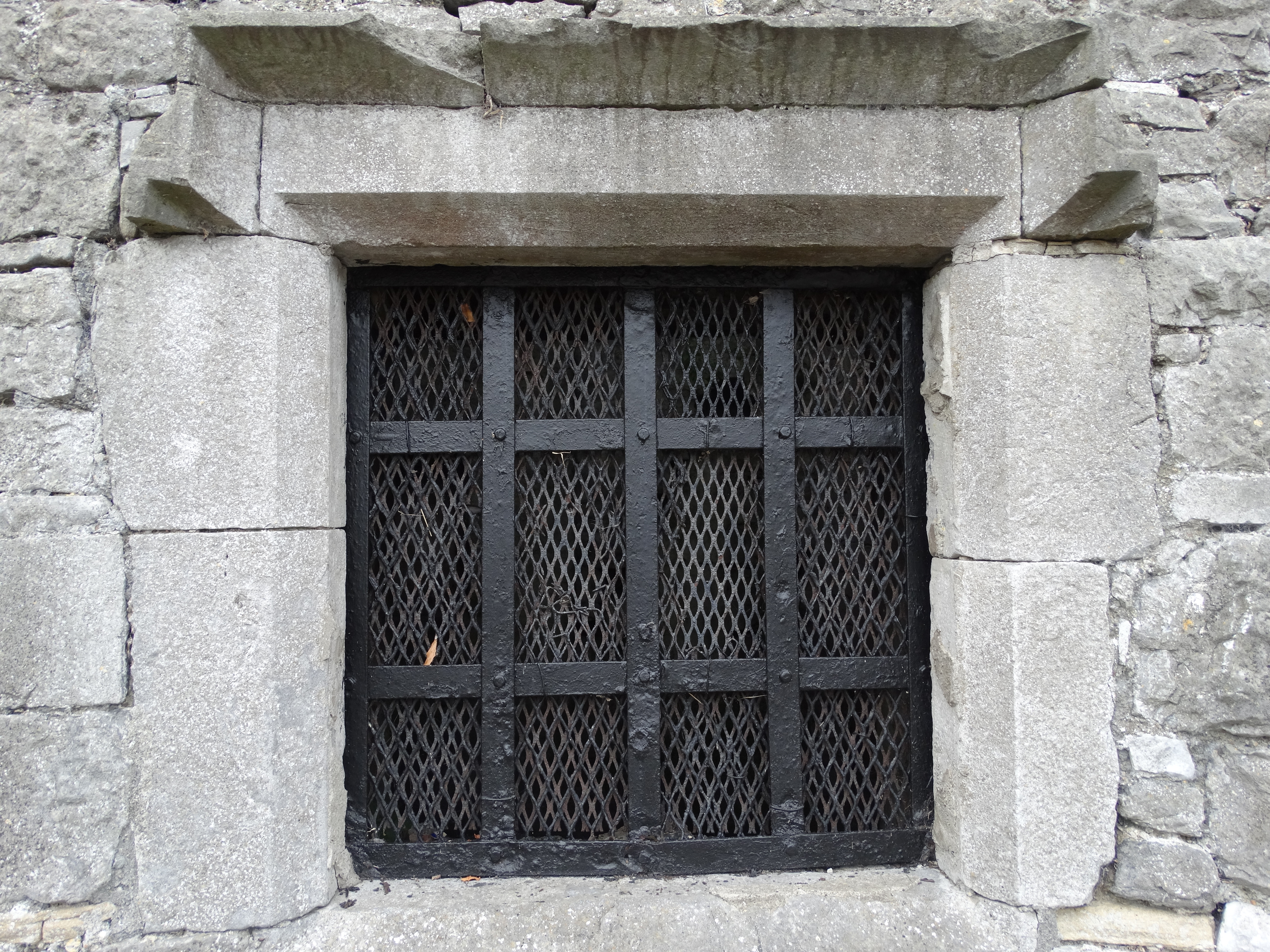
Window

A four-storey tower house with some original mullioned windows. It is vaulted above the ground floor and the front and back walls were removed so that the castle is pierced by a large Gothic arch.
