= Kilmallock railway station =

Station in County Limerick, Ireland

Coordinates: 52.394537°N 8.564262°W

Kilmallock railway station was a station in County Limerick, Ireland. It was on the main Dublin to Cork line, serving the small town of Kilmallock. It is around 800m south-east of the town centre. The station was built in 1849, originally by the Great Southern and Western Railway. It was closed in March 1976.

Much of the original 1849 station building (on the up side of the line) still exists, but became derelict having been abandoned when the station closed in 1976. Although there have been many calls by councillors etc. to repurpose the building in some way, and although some repairs were done in the early 2020s, Limerick Council issued a derelict site notice in June 2025. As at 2025 Irish Rail have no plans to reinstate rail services at the station.
