= Robert Cleary (priest) =

Robert Cleary was Archdeacon of Emly from 1904 to 1918

Robert Cleary was Archdeacon of Emly from 1904 to 1918.

Hutton was educated at Trinity College, Dublin and ordained in 1866.

He served at Cappoquin (Curate, then Acting Incumbent); and then at Galbally (Incumbent. He was also Rural Dean of Duntryleague from 1892 to 1904; and a Canon of Cashel from 1898 to 1904.

He died on 18 August 1918.
