= Mannix Joyce =

Mannix Joyce (Irish: Mainchín Seoighe; 1924 – 3 July 2006) was an Irish local historian and writer, known particularly for his publications on County Limerick.

He was born in Tankardstown, Kilmallock, County Limerick. In 1941 he started work with Limerick County Council, where he remained all his life, mainly in the position of Information Officer. He was a prolific contributor to the Limerick Leader newspaper; his first article appeared in 1944 and his column (under the pen-name An Mangaire Súgach, the Merry Peddlar) continued unbroken until 2002.

He was awarded an honorary doctorate by the National University of Ireland in 1990.

== Select works ==
- Maríodh Sean South, 1964
- Cois Maighe na gCaor, 1965
- Dromin Athlacca (1978)
- A Local History of Bruree,
- The Story of Kilmallock (1987)
- A Portrait of Limerick (1982)
- County Limerick People and Places (1993)
- The Joyce Brothers of Glenosheen
- The Irish Quotation Book
- Staker Wallis: His Life and Times and Death (1994)
