= Kilrush Church =

Medieval ruined church in Limerick, Ireland

- Old Church · St. Munchin’s · St. Mainchin’s Church
- Cill Rois
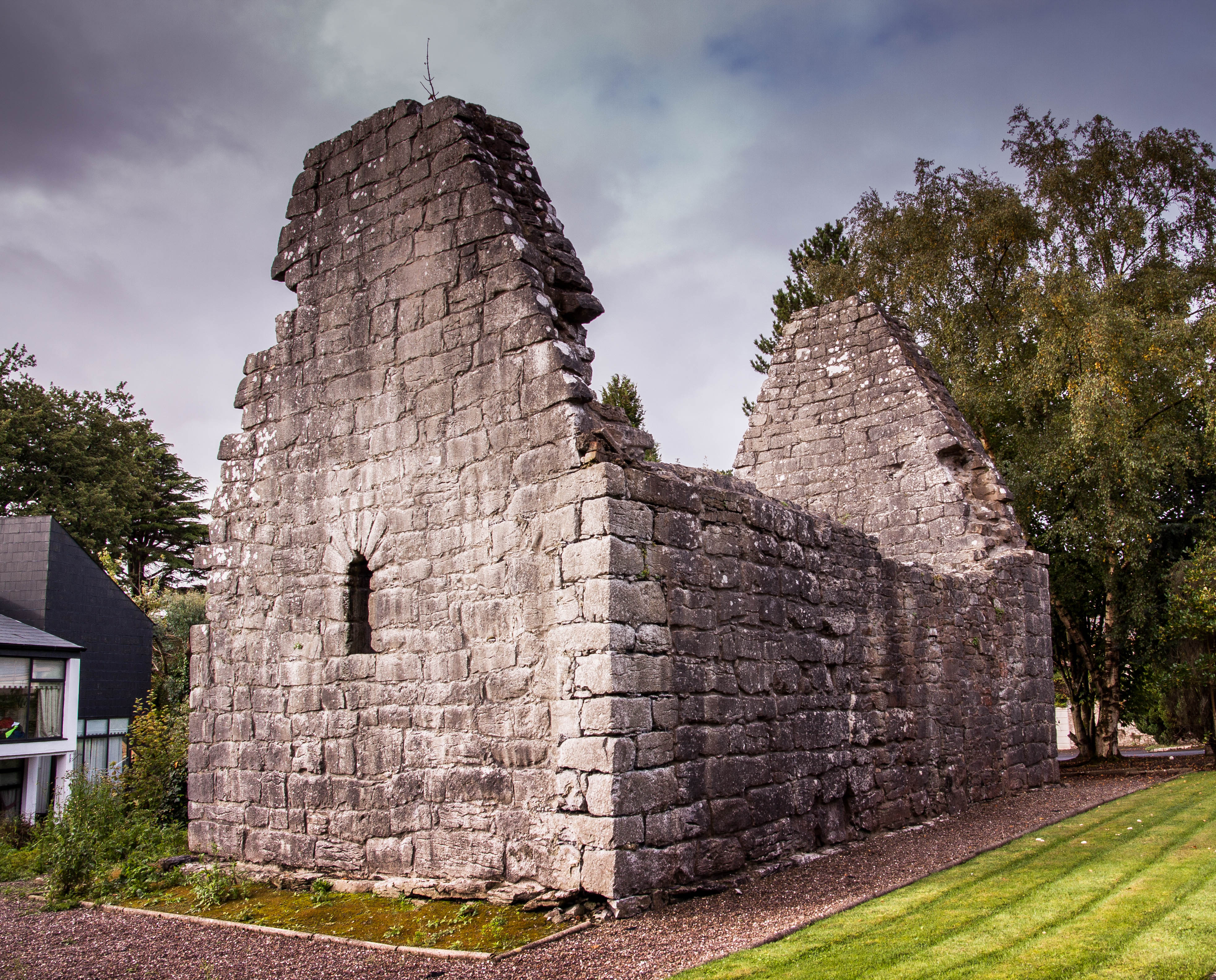
- The church in 2015

- Location within Ireland
- 52.660838°N 8.655120°W
- Location: Old Church Road, Limerick, County Limerick
- Country: Ireland
- Denomination: Catholic (pre-Reformation)

History
- Dedication: Mainchín of Limerick

Architecture
- Functional status: inactive
- Style: Celtic
- Years built: 10th century AD?

Specifications
- Length: 9 m (30 ft)
- Width: 5.5 m (18 ft)
- Materials: stone, mortar

Administration
- Diocese: Limerick
Designations
National monument of Ireland
- Official name: Kilrush Church
- Reference no.: 366

Kilrush Church, also called St. Munchin's Church, is a medieval church and a National Monument in Limerick city, Ireland.

== Location ==
The church is located 2 kilometres (1.2 mi) west of the city centre, on the north bank of the River Shannon.

== History ==
The church was built perhaps in the 10th century, and first appears in records of 1201; it is believed to be oldest building in the city. The window in the south wall is 15th century, from a nearby Franciscan church. It is dedicated to Mainchín mac Setnai, a saint of the late 6th century. It was excavated in 1999; approximately 40 bodies were found buried beneath the Quinlivan window, dating to the 16th or 17th century.

== Church ==
Based on its large stone blocks and lintel, the church is placed to the pre-Norman period. It is rectangular.

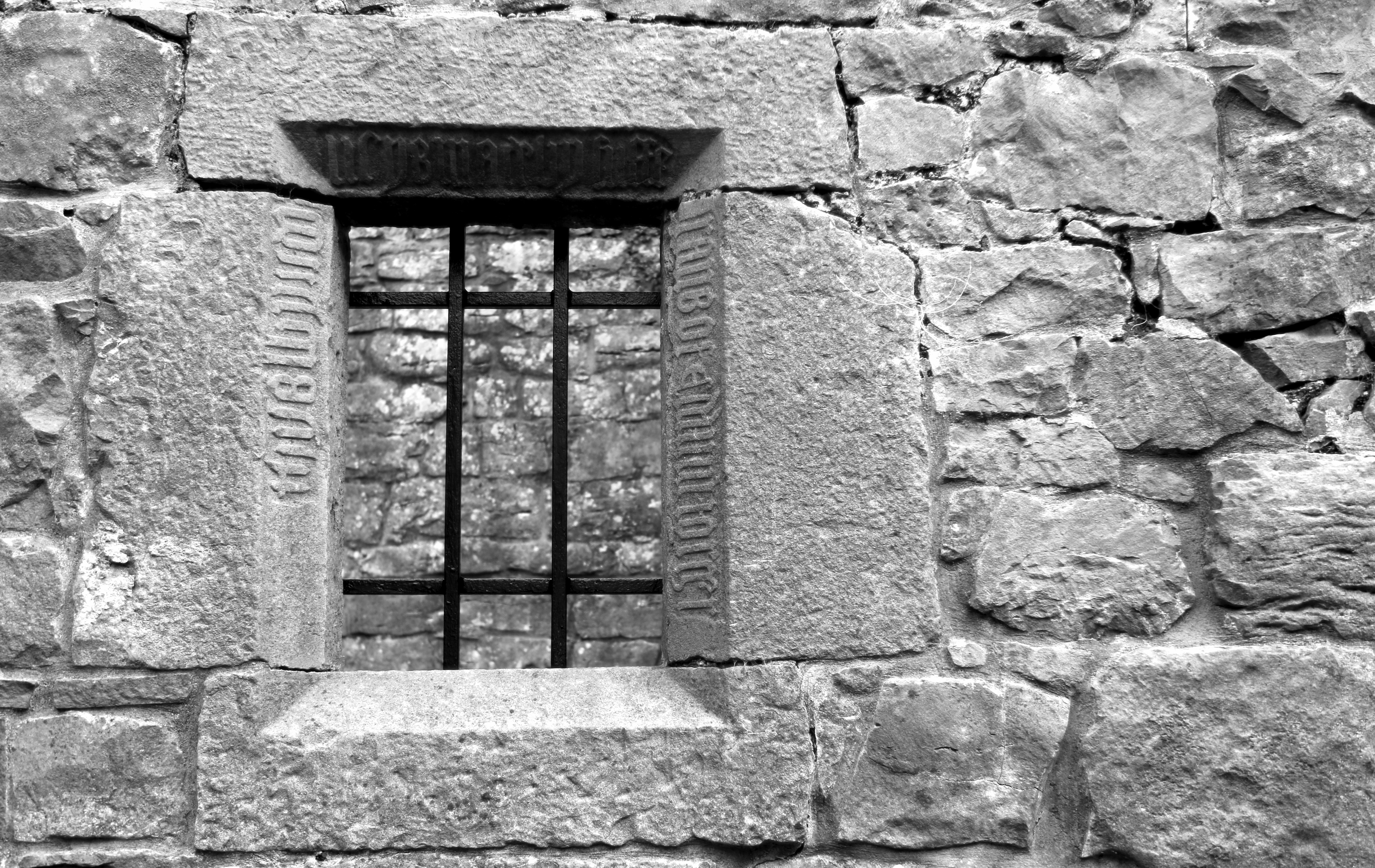
Window with medieval inscription

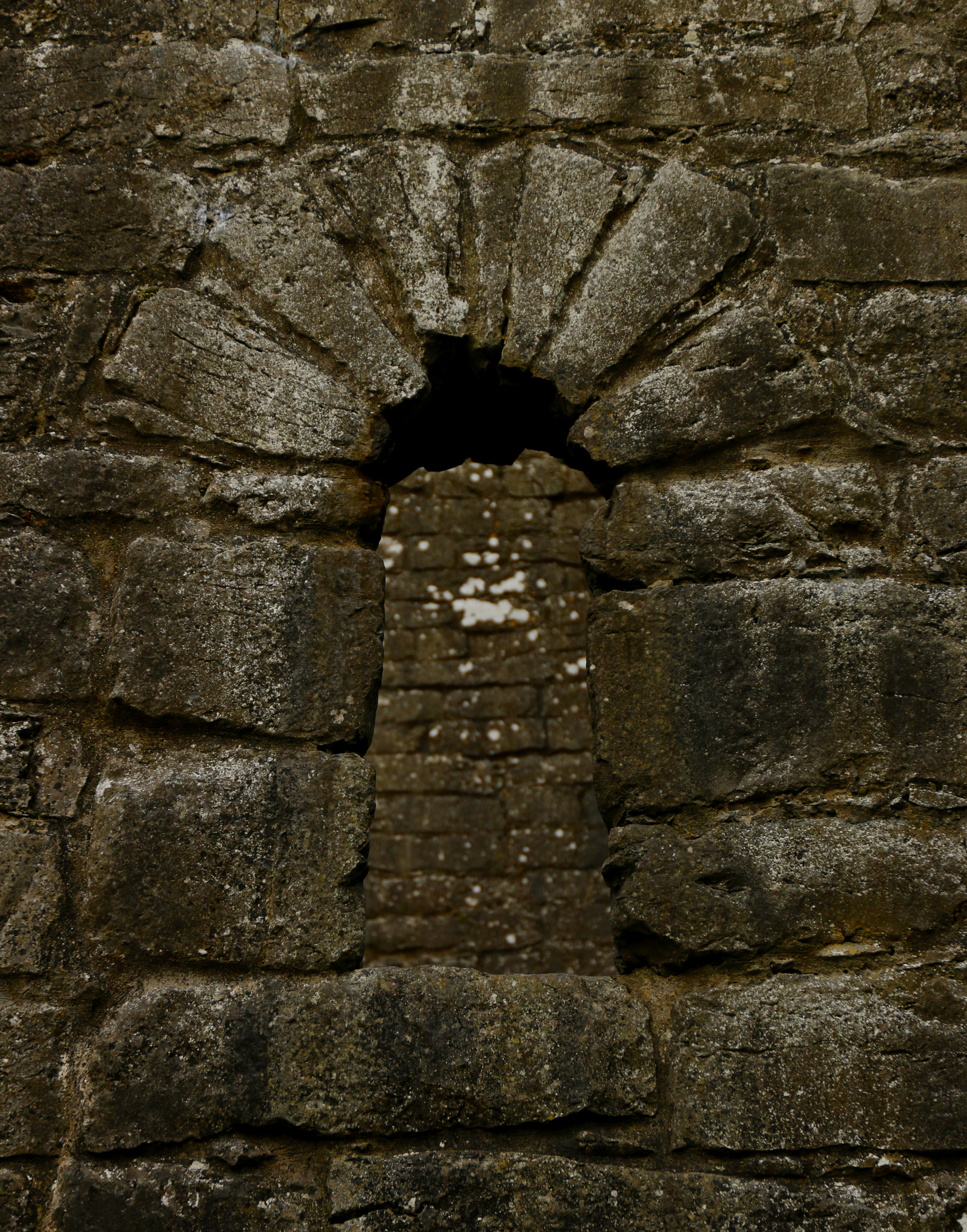
Arched window

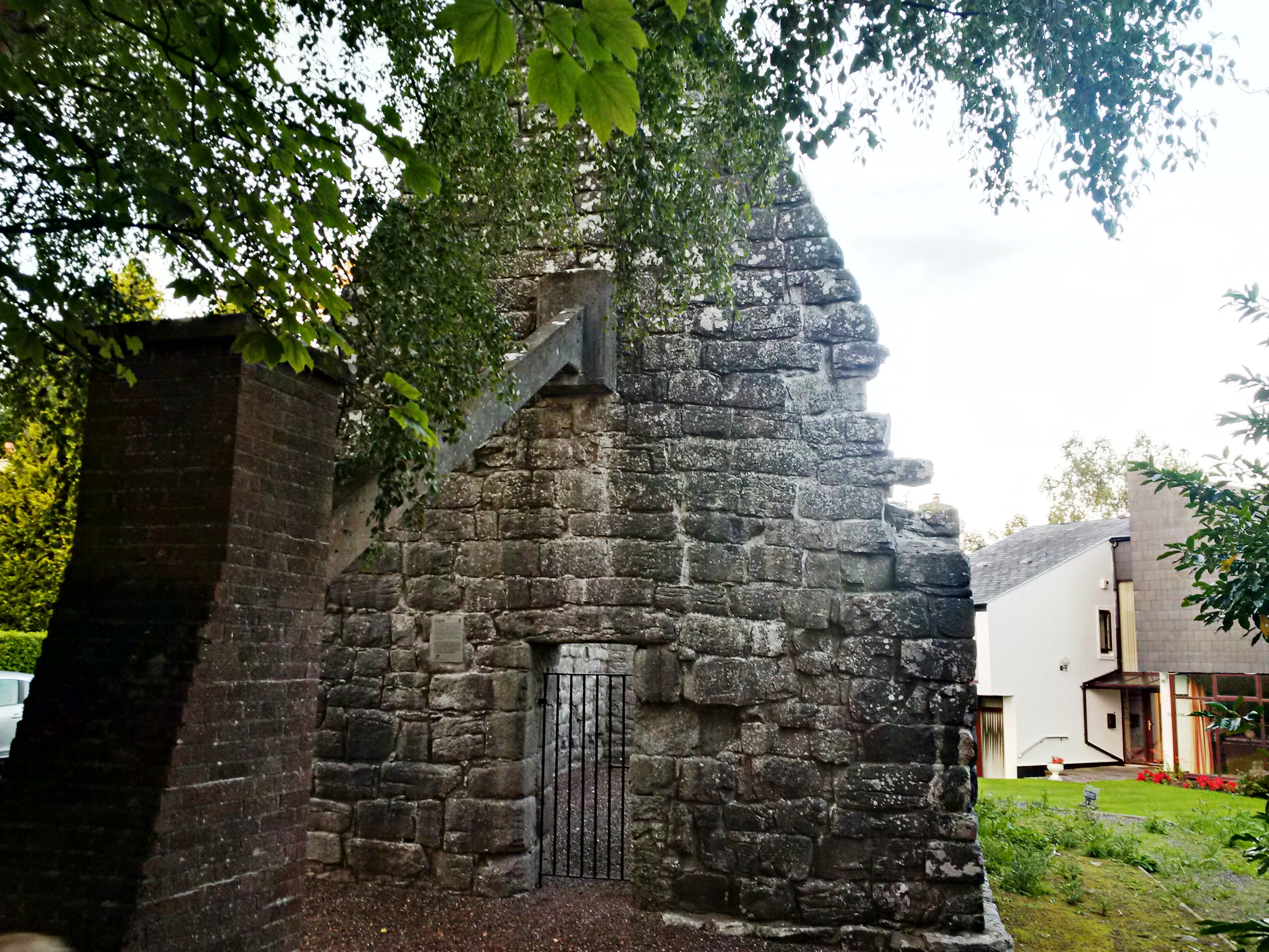
Metal strut holding up the wall
