= Kilmallock =

Town in County Limerick, Ireland

Kilmallock Irish: Cill Mocheallóg
- Town
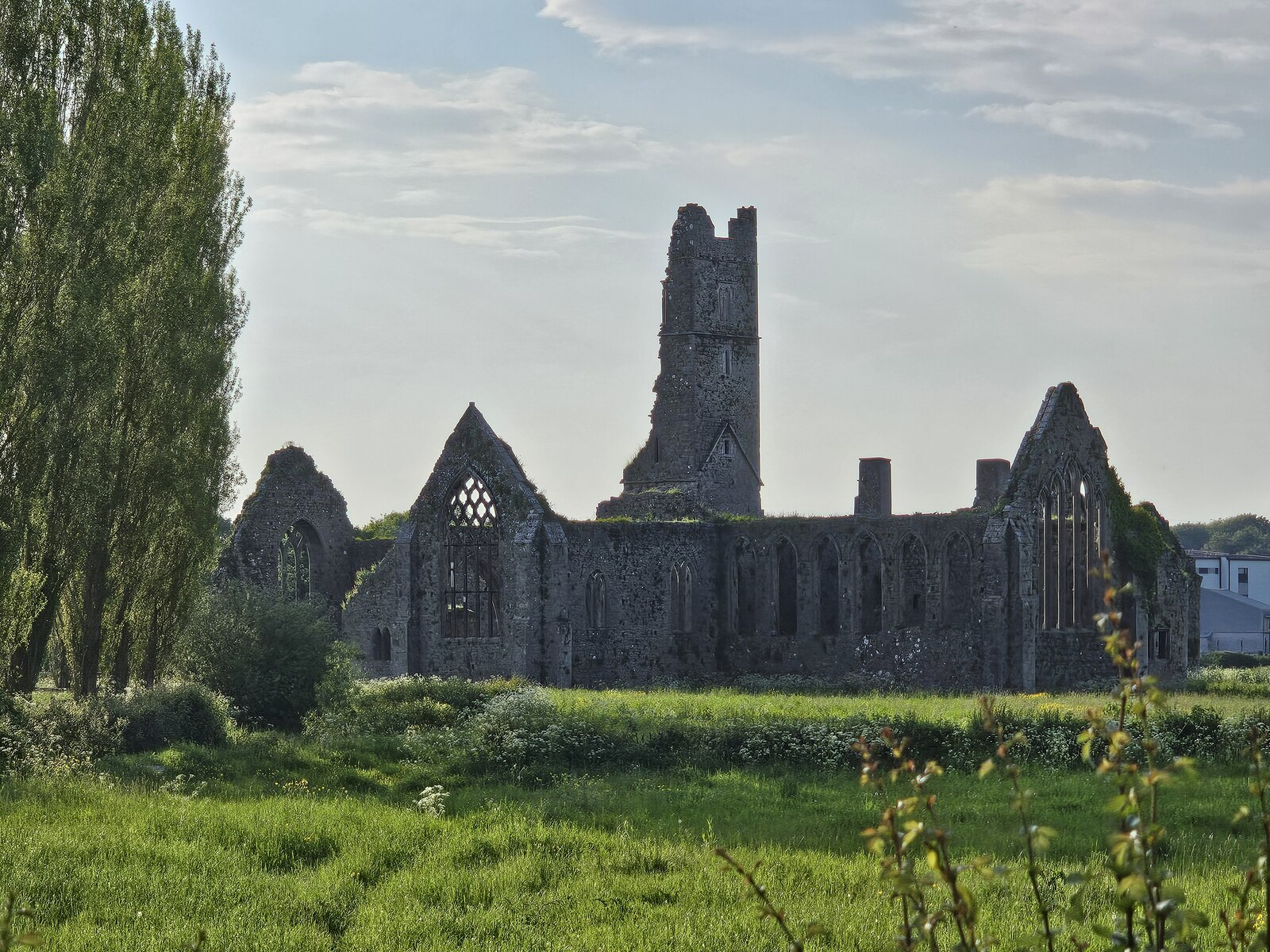
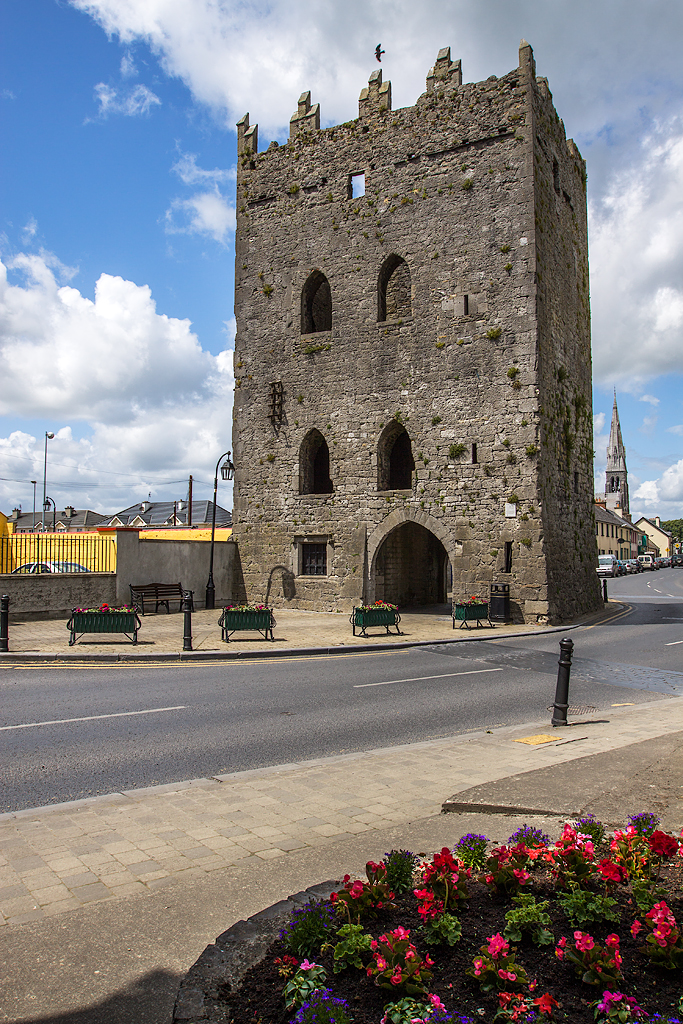
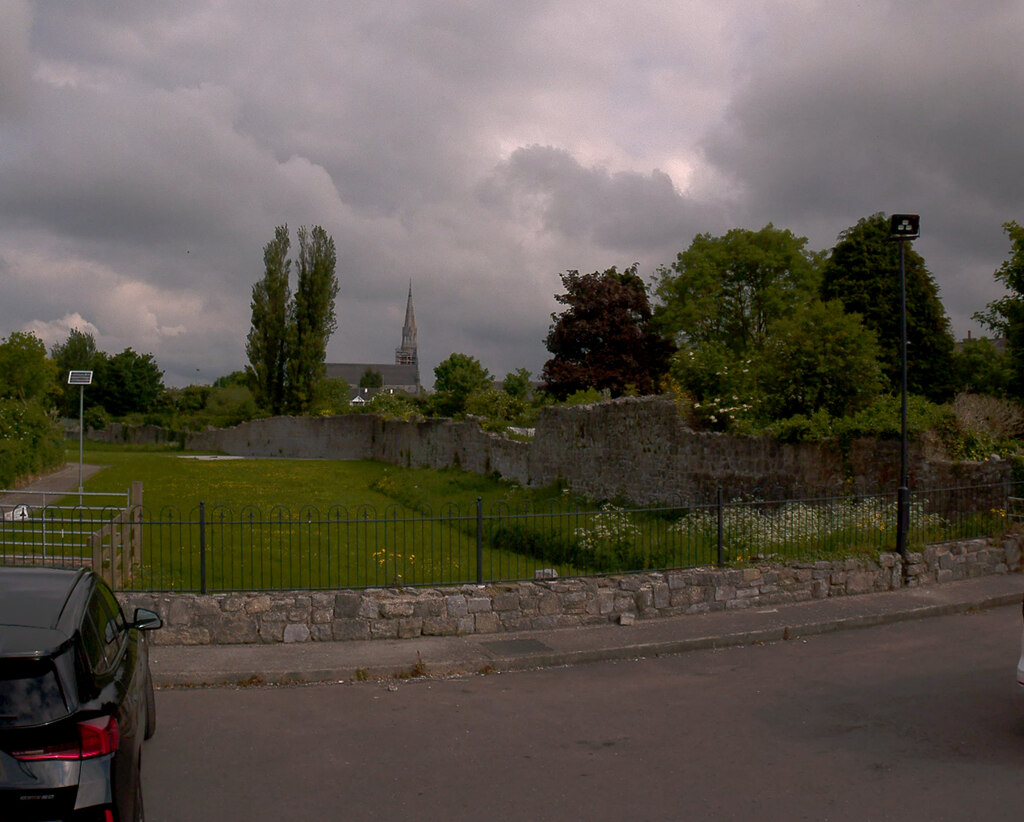
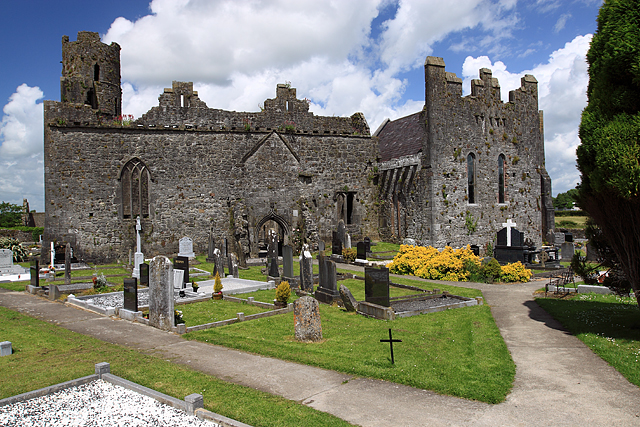
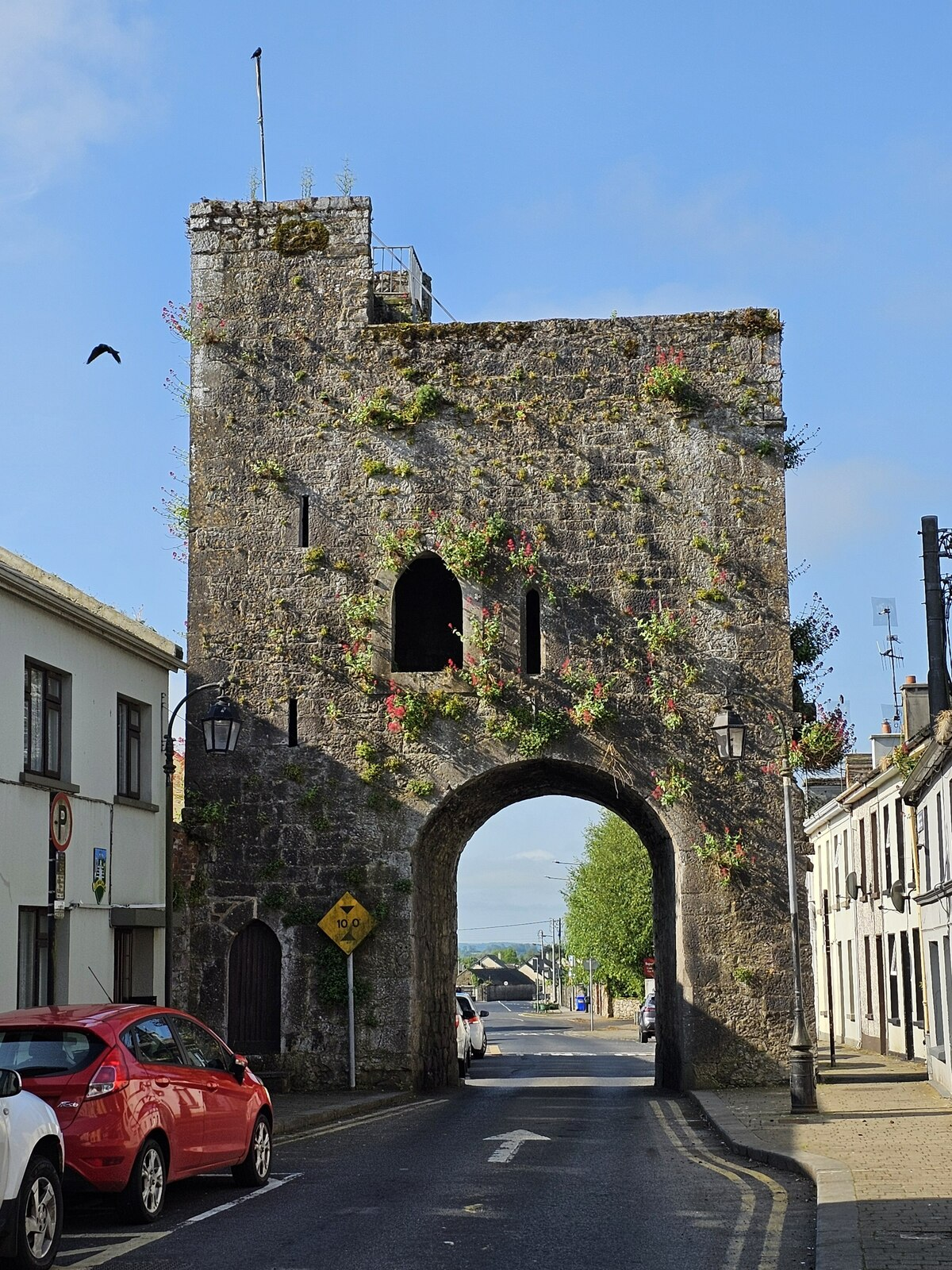
- Kilmallock Priory King John's Castle Town walls Collegiate Church Blossom Gate
- Nickname: The Irish Balbec
- Location in Ireland
- Coordinates: 52°23′56″N 8°34′30″W
- Country: Ireland
- Province: Munster
- County: Limerick

Population (2022)
  - Total: 1,761
- Time zone: UTC±0 (WET)
  - Summer (DST): UTC+1 (IST)
- Eircode routing key: V35
- Telephone area code: +353(0)63
- Irish Grid Reference: R607277

Kilmallock (Irish: Cill Mocheallóg) is a historic medieval market town in south County Limerick, Ireland, near the border with County Cork, approximately 18 miles (29 km) south of Limerick, 34 miles (55 km) north of Cork, and 117 miles (188 km) southwest of Dublin. The town had a population of 1,761 in 2022.

Kilmallock features a Dominican Priory in the town and King's Castle (or King John's Castle). The remains of medieval walls which encircled the settlement are still visible.

== History ==
=== Foundation and development ===
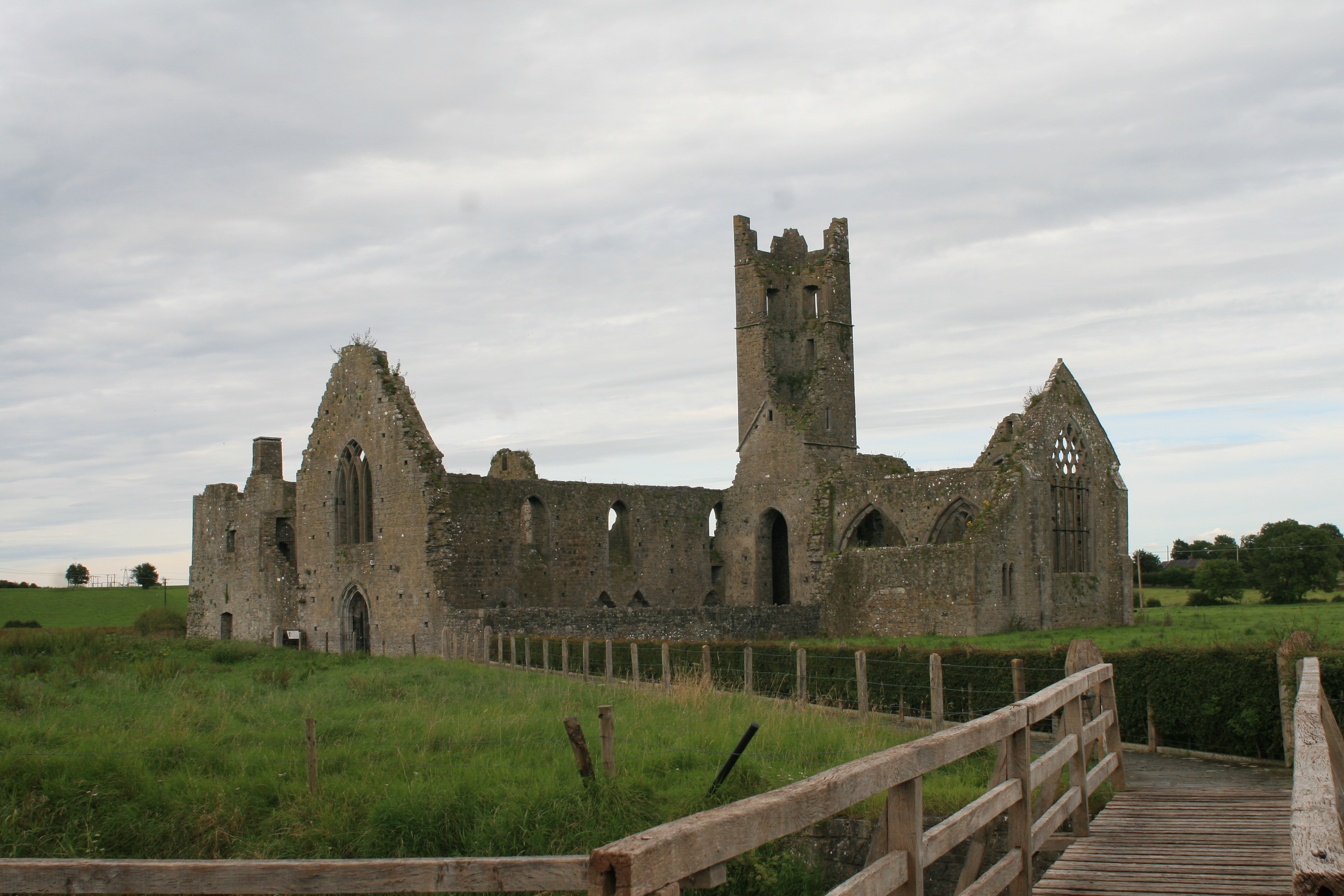
Kilmallock Priory

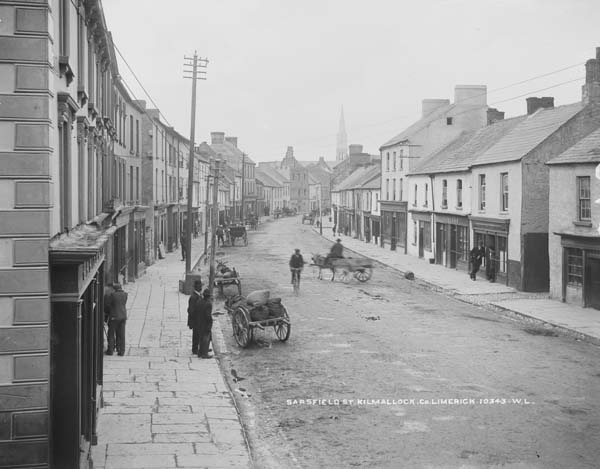
Sarsfield Street

Saint Mocheallóg (literally 'Mo - Ceallach - Og' meaning 'my young Ceallach') built a church in the area in the early 7th century, and the town's name derives from the Irish Cill Mocheallóg meaning "the church of Mocheallóg". This saint also established a hermitage or a small community of monks on Inisvickillane, one of the Blasket Islands off the coast of County Kerry. In St. Kieran's College, Kilkenny, an ancient statue of Mocheallóg was venerated, depicting him as a bearded man with a monk's cowl.

The town was of considerable importance in the late medieval period, ranking as one of the main urban areas in Ireland at the time. The Collegiate Church of St Peter and St Paul was built by 1241. Kilmallock was located in a position of some strategic importance, and in consequence the town frequently became a target during times of war.

In 1571, Kilmallock was sacked and burned by the forces of James FitzMaurice FitzGerald during the First Desmond Rebellion.

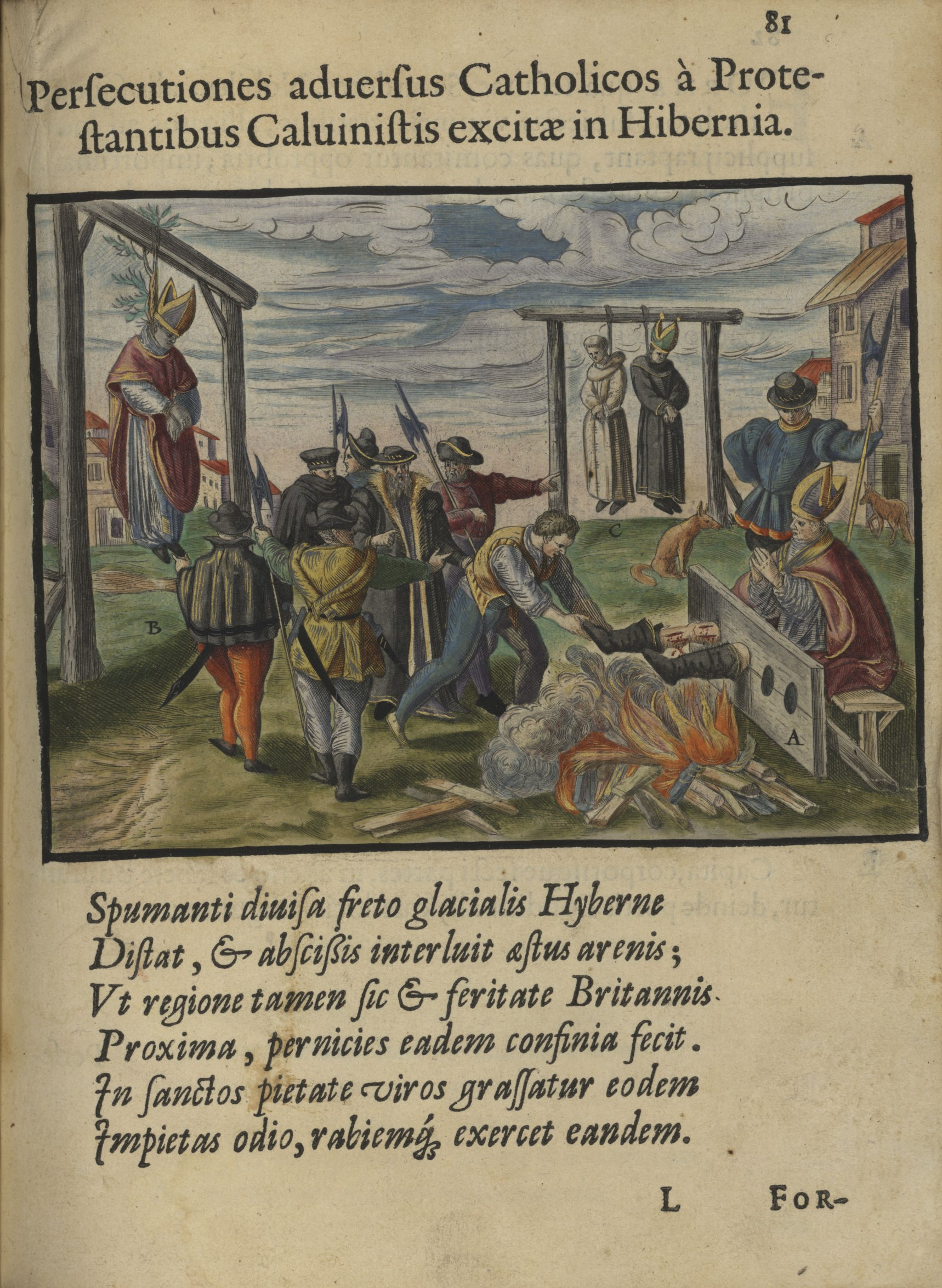
Richard Verstegen's depiction of the 1584 execution of Archbishop Dermot O'Hurley. The 1579 hanging of fellow Irish Catholic Martyrs Bishop Patrick O'Hely and Friar Conn Ó Ruairc at Kilmallock is shown in the background.

After being betrayed by the Rebel Earl of Desmond and captured after being secretly smuggled back to Ireland from France and put ashore at Corca Dhuibhne, Irish Catholic Martyrs Bishop Patrick O'Hely and Friar Conn O'Rourke were hanged under orders from Lord President of Munster Sir William Drury outside one of the gates in the walls of Kilmallock on 13 August 1579. Their bodies were allowed to remain suspended from the gallows for fourteen days. Both priests were beatified by Pope John Paul II in September 1992.

Seventy years later, during the Irish Confederate Wars, the Dominican Priory of Kilmallock was attacked and destroyed by a Parliamentary Army under Lord Inchiquin in 1648. Its ruins are the best known historic landmark of Kilmallock. The local cemetery is the burial place of the noted 18th-century Munster Irish poet Andrias Mac Craith. Better known as An Mangaire Súgach, his best known poem is "Slán le Máigh", a Sean nos song in praise of the entire Maigue valley when he was temporarily exiled from it. The house where he died still stands at the bottom of Wolfe Tone Street near the River Loobagh. The house known as (Irish: Tigh An Fhile) ("The Poet's House") has information panels about the poet at the doorway. The town also has a small museum depicting the historic past of this once fortified Geraldine town.

=== 20th century ===
During the Battle of Kilmallock, the town saw bitter fighting in July 1922 during the Irish Civil War, when it was held by anti-Treaty IRA forces under Liam Deasy and eventually taken by Irish Army troops under the command of General Eoin O'Duffy. This battle was one of a number of events which contributed to the dissolution of the short-lived Munster Republic.

As part of a brief sectarian campaign in July 1935, arsonists burnt the Church of Ireland building to the ground, causing damage costing thousands of pounds.

== Amenities ==
Kilmallock is located in southern County Limerick, and provides economic and other amenities for the surrounding rural hinterland. The town was designated as a "key service centre for South Limerick" in Limerick City and County Council's county development plan (2010–2016).

Services in the town include a number of primary and post-primary schools, a library and theatre, post office, a Garda station, veterinary practices, medical clinics, and retail and other businesses. Local community and development groups include the Kilmallock & District Community Council, Kilmallock Tourism Development group, and Kilmallock Association for Trade and Commerce.

== Sports ==
The area is home to the Kilmallock Cycling Club, Kilmallock Athletic Club and also a centre for genetic horse breeding – with several stallion farms located in the district.

Members of the local Kilmallock GAA club have represented Limerick in the Munster hurling and All-Ireland hurling championships, and the club has won 12 senior county hurling titles.

== Transport ==
=== Road ===
Kilmallock is at the junction of the R512 road (which runs from Limerick city to Fermoy) and the R515 road (which runs from Abbeyfeale, via Charleville, to Tipperary town).

=== Rail ===
Although the main Dublin–Cork railway line passes by the town, there is no longer a station: Kilmallock railway station closed in 1976. The station building (dating from around 1849) still stands, but has been derelict for many years. The nearest station today is Charleville, 8 km (5 mi) south-west of Kilmallock.

=== Bus ===
As of 2024 there are several Bus Éireann buses every day to/from Limerick city, and occasional Local Link buses to/from Charleville and other local places.

== Annalistic references ==
From The Annals of the Four Masters:

- M1571.4. James Mac Maurice took Kilmallock, not from a desire of obtaining its riches and various treasures, though its riches were immense, but because it had always been the rendezvous and sally-port of the English and Geraldines in their contests against him. Before sunrise in the morning those who had gone to sleep happily and comfortably were aroused from their slumber by a furious attack made by the warlike troops of the Clann-Sweeny and Clann-Sheehy, who were along with James Mac Maurice; and they proceeded to divide among themselves its gold, silver, various riches, and valuable jewels, which the father would not have acknowledged to his heir, or the mother to her daughter, on the day before. They were engaged for the space of three days and nights in carrying away the several kinds of riches and precious goods, as cups and ornamented goblets, upon their horses and steeds, to the woods and forests of Etharlach, and sending others of them privately to their friends and companions. They then set fire to the town, and raised a dense, heavy cloud, and a black, thick, and gloomy shroud of smoke about it, after they had torn down and demolished its houses of stone and wood; so that Kilmallock became the receptacle and abode of wolves, in addition to all the other misfortunes up to that time.

== People ==
- Chidley Coote (Member of Parliament for Kilmallock, 1695 to 1703)
- Charles Coote (died 1780), priest
- Eyre Coote (1726–1783), East India Company officer. was Commander-in-Chief, India, twice. 1761–1763 and 1779–1783.
- Mannix Joyce (1924–2006), local historian and writer
- Muiris Mac Ionrachtaigh (died 1585), a Roman Catholic priest and native of Kilmallock who was executed during the Second Desmond Rebellion
- Seán Moylan (1888–1957), politician
- Andrew O'Shaughnessy (born 1984), hurler
- Patrick Quinlan (1919–2001), politician from Dromin near Kilmallock
- William Turner (1871–1936), bishop of Buffalo, New York

== See also ==
- List of towns and villages in Ireland
