= Cush Earthworks =

- Créfort na Coise (Irish)
- Location within Ireland
- 52.381130°N 8.442962°W
- Type: Earthworks
- Location: Cush, Kilfinane, County Limerick, Ireland

History
- Built: 1000 BC – AD 400

Site notes
- Owner: State

National monument of Ireland
- Official name: Cush Earthworks
- Reference no.: 663

The Cush Earthworks are a series of earthworks, and a National Monument, located in County Limerick, Ireland.

== Location ==
The Cush Earthworks are located on the western slope of Slievereagh, 3 km (1.9 mi) northwest of Kilfinane, near the headwaters of the River Loobagh.

== History ==
The Cush region was occupied by an Iron Age community from c. 1000 BC to AD 400. Some of the burials are late Bronze Age, but the raths are thought to be no earlier than 3rd century BC.

There were several cist burials, some with food vessels as grave goods.

There were also some souterrains lined with timber and stone.

Excavated in 1932–34. Discovered items included rotary querns, glass beads, an urn, iron slag and burials.

== Description ==
To the south, six raths (each 20 m in diameter) were joined with a large rectangular enclosure located to the west. To the north lie 6+ more ringforts. Around them are an ancient field system.
