= Killulta Church =

- Kildimo Church
- Cill Ulta
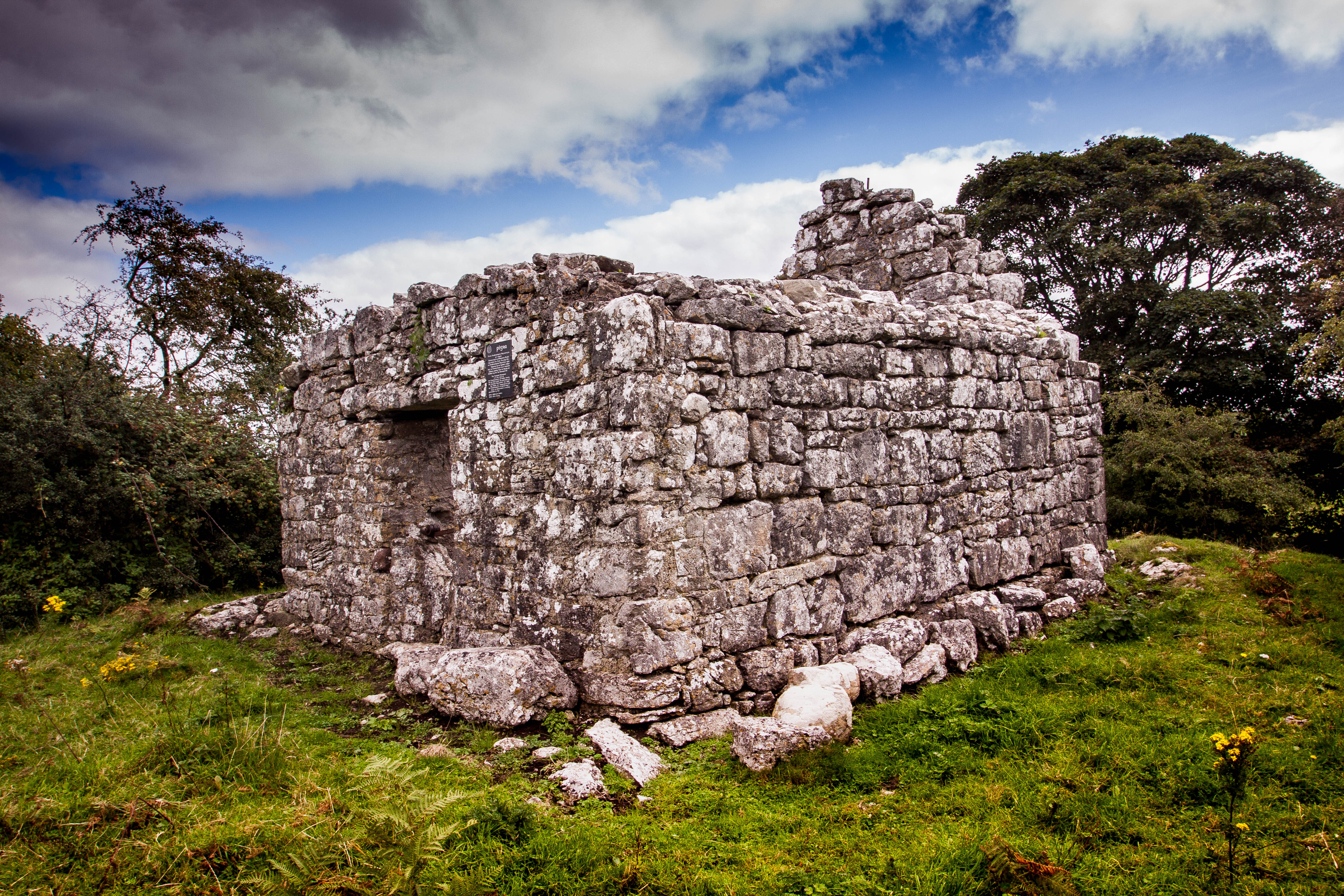

- Location within Ireland
- 52.6290°N 8.8360°W
- Location: Glennameade, Kildimo, County Limerick
- Country: Ireland
- Denomination: Catholic (pre-Reformation)

History
- Dedication: Saint Ultan (?)

Architecture
- Functional status: inactive
- Style: Celtic
- Years built: 9th century AD?

Specifications
- Length: 5 m (16 ft)
- Width: 5 m (16 ft)
- Materials: stone, mortar

Administration
- Diocese: Limerick
Designations
National monument of Ireland
- Official name: Killulta Church
- Reference no.: 341

Killulta Church is a medieval church and a National Monument in County Limerick, Ireland.

== Location ==
The church is located 1.6 kilometres (0.99 mi) west-northwest of Kildimo village, in the western part of the Maigue valley, southwest of Dromore Lough and Bleach Lough.

== History ==
Killulta church is believed to be one of the oldest stone churches in Ireland.

Samuel Lewis incorrectly claimed it was built by the Knights Templar in 1290. However, others date the church to pre-1100, even as early as the 5th century AD. Most scholars date it to the 9th century.

Local historian Mairtín Ó Corrbhuí records that a bronze pin and bronze sword were found near the church.

The name is believed to mean "church of the Ulsterman" or "church of Saint Ultan."

It was also known as Kellallathan (cealla leathan, "broad church").

== Church ==
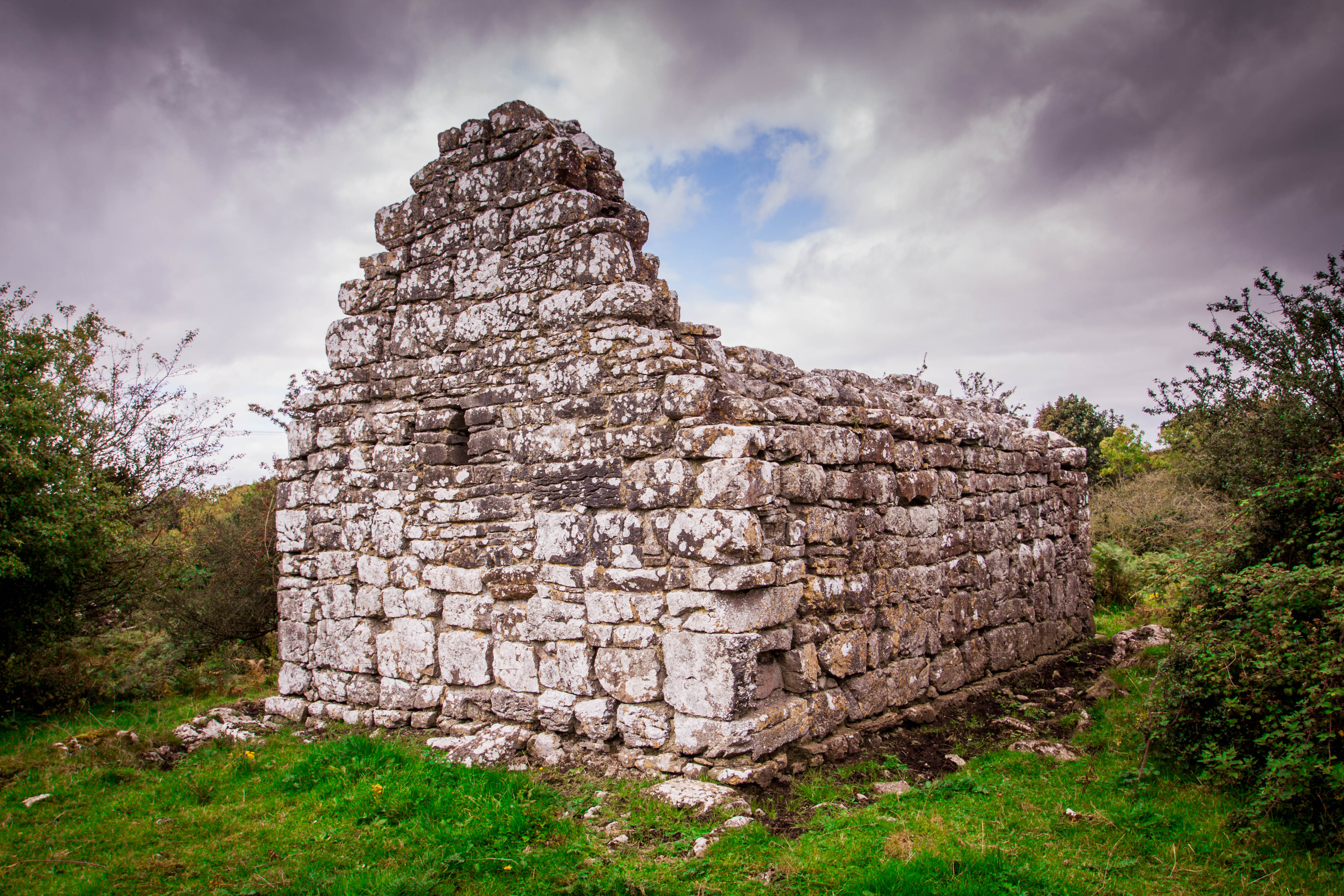
Another view of the building

Killulta measures 5 × 3 metres on the inside, with walls 1 metre thick. It is constructed of large stones and has a plain doorway and triangular-headed east window.
