= Kilmihill Ringfort =

Ringfort (rath) in County Limerick, Ireland

- Ráth Chill Mhichíl (Irish)
- Kilmihil Ringfort
- Location within Ireland
- 52.460560°N 8.854760°W
- Type: ringfort
- Periods: Early Christian age (c. AD 400–900)
- Location: Kilmihil, Ballingarry, County Limerick, Ireland

Site notes
- Material: earth
- Elevation: 108 m (354 ft)
- Area: 0.16 ha (0.40 acres)
- Diameter: 51 m (167 ft)
- Owner: private

National monument of Ireland
- Official name: Kilmihill Ringfort
- Reference no.: 538

Kilmihill Ringfort is a ringfort (rath) and National Monument located in County Limerick, Ireland. On the Record of Monuments and Places its code is LI037-042.

== Location ==
Kilmihill Ringfort is located 1.5 km (1 mile) SSE of Ballingarry.
