= Duntryleague passage tomb =

- Tuama Pasáiste Dhún Trí Liag (Irish)
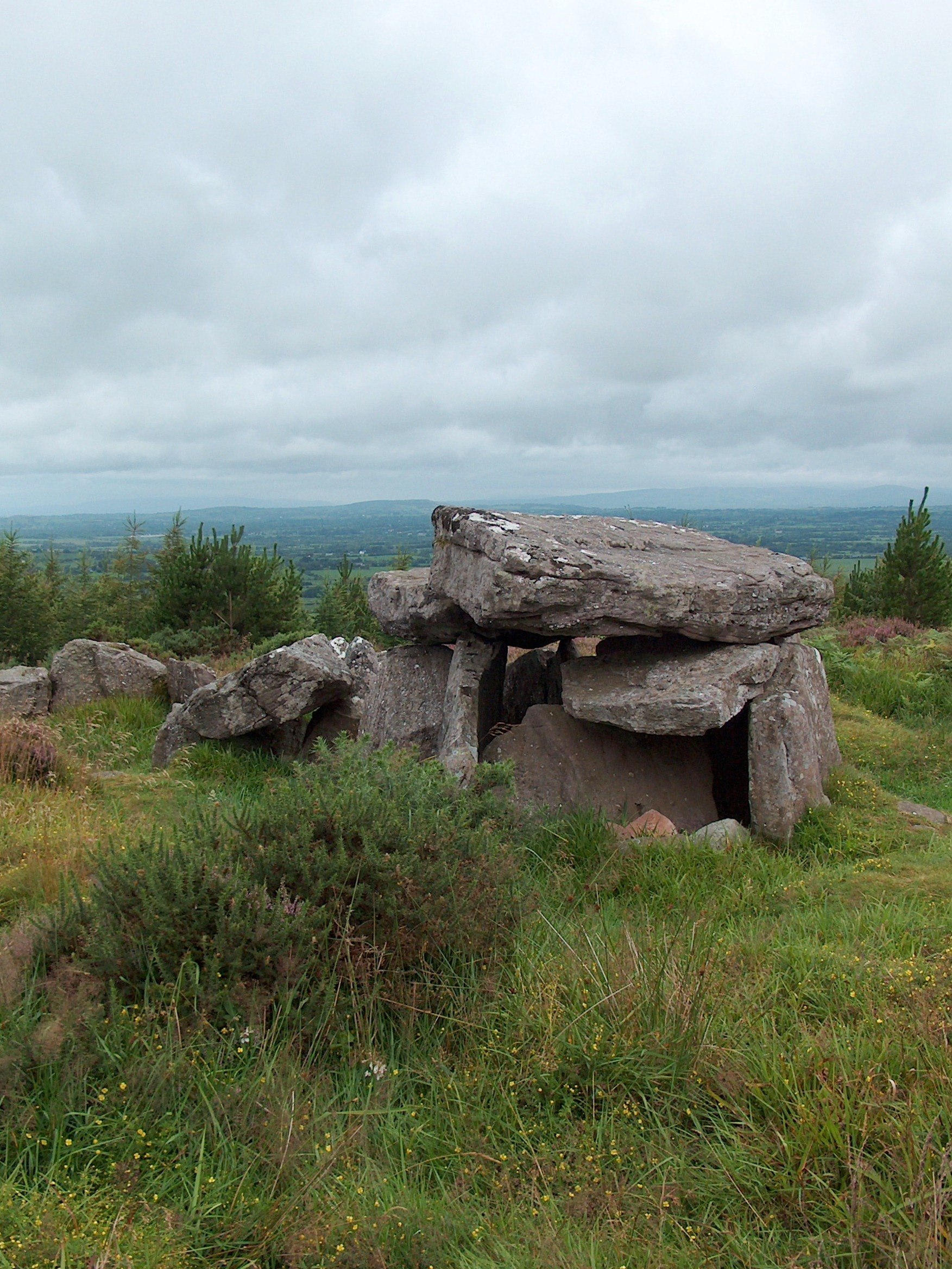
- The tomb in 2015

- Location in Ireland
- 52.406472°N 8.322376°W
- Type: passage grave
- Location: County Limerick, Ireland

History
- Built: c. 3500 BC

Site notes
- Elevation: 262 m (860 ft)

National monument of Ireland
- Official name: Duntryleague passage tomb
- Reference no.: 315

Duntryleague passage tomb, also known as "Diarmuid and Gráinne's Bed", is a passage grave and national monument located atop Duntryleague Hill in County Limerick, Ireland. There is a very narrow entrance to the chamber with many kerb stones still in place near its entrance.

== Location ==
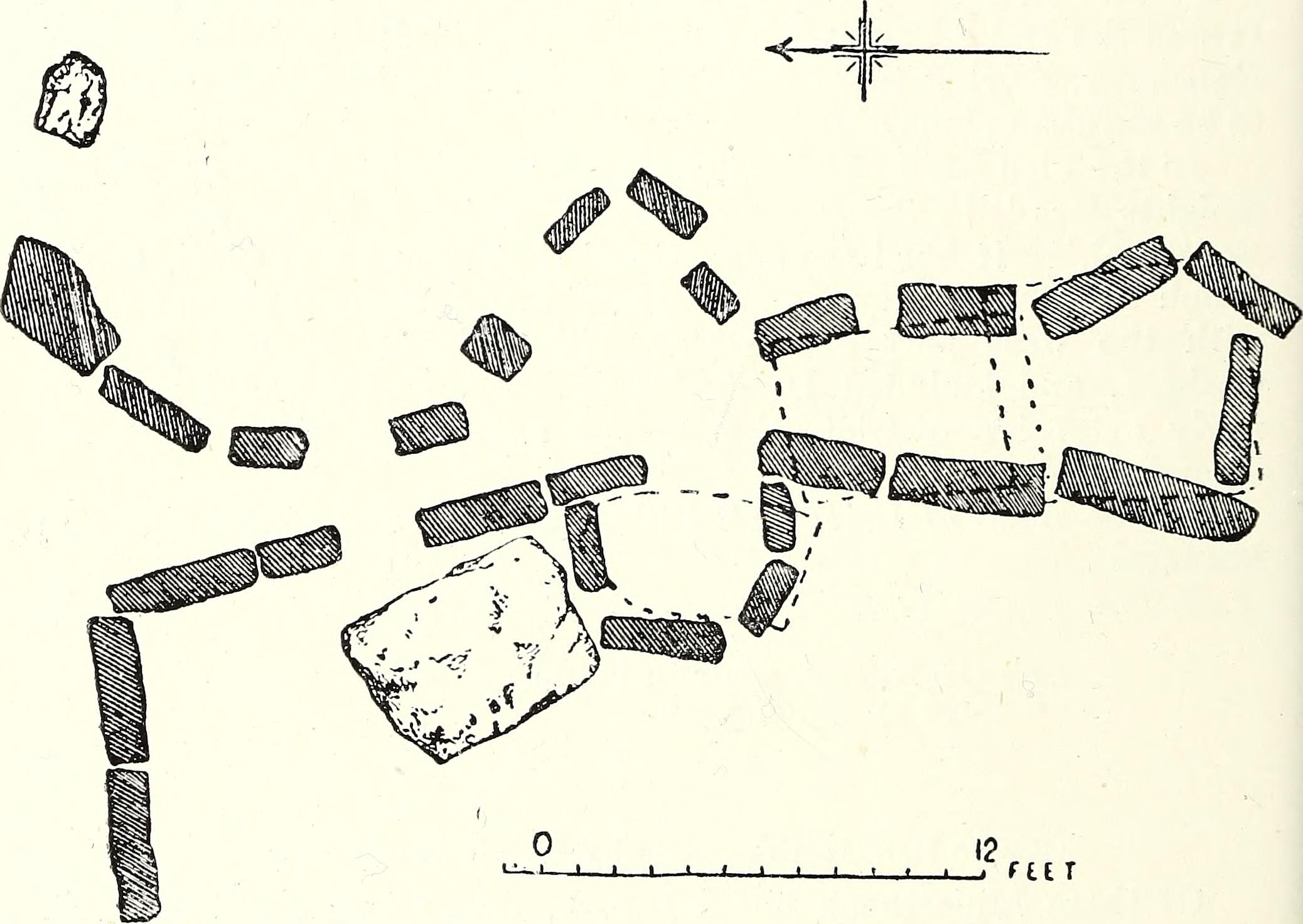
Plan of the tomb

Duntryleague Passage Tomb is located atop Duntryleague Hill, 1.9 km (1.2 mi) WNW of Galbally, County Limerick. The hill overlooks the River Loobagh valley to the north.

== History ==
Duntryleague passage tomb was built c. 3500 BC.

According to legend, it was the burial place of Ailill Aulom (Oilill Olum), a King of Munster.

== Description ==
The covering cairn is missing but most of the capstones are still in place. The tomb is aligned north-south. It is built in a style suggestive of similar tombs in Brittany.
