= Fanning's Castle =

Ruined tower house in Limerick, Ireland

- Mary Street, King's Island, Limerick, Ireland
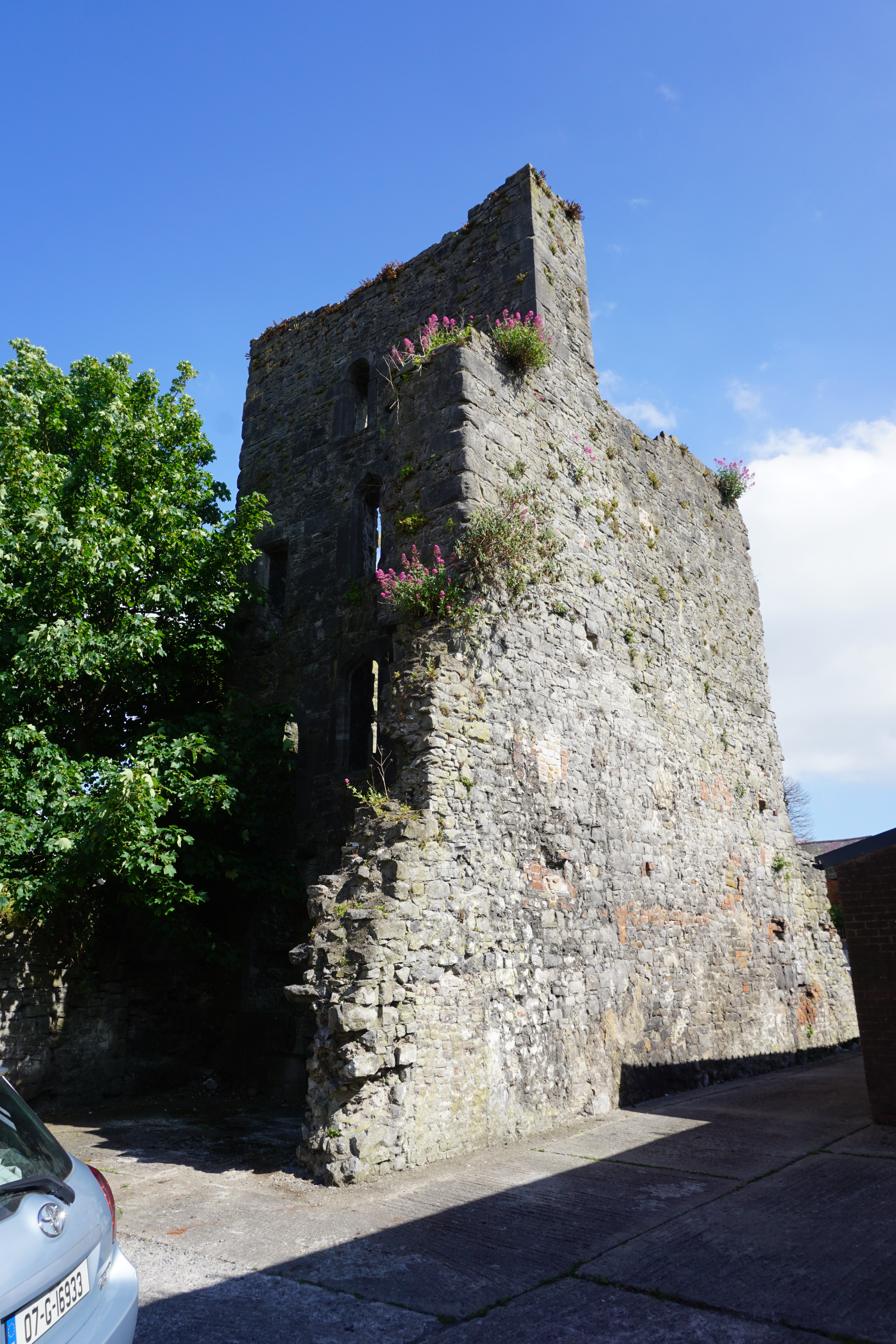

Site information
- Type: tower house
- Condition: partially ruined

Location
- Coordinates: 52°40′02″N 8°37′19″W

Site history
- Built: c. 1641
- Built by: Dominic Fanning

Fanning's Castle (Irish: Caisleán Uí Fhionáin), also called Whitamore's Castle, is the remains of a tower house and National Monument located in Limerick, Ireland.

== Location ==
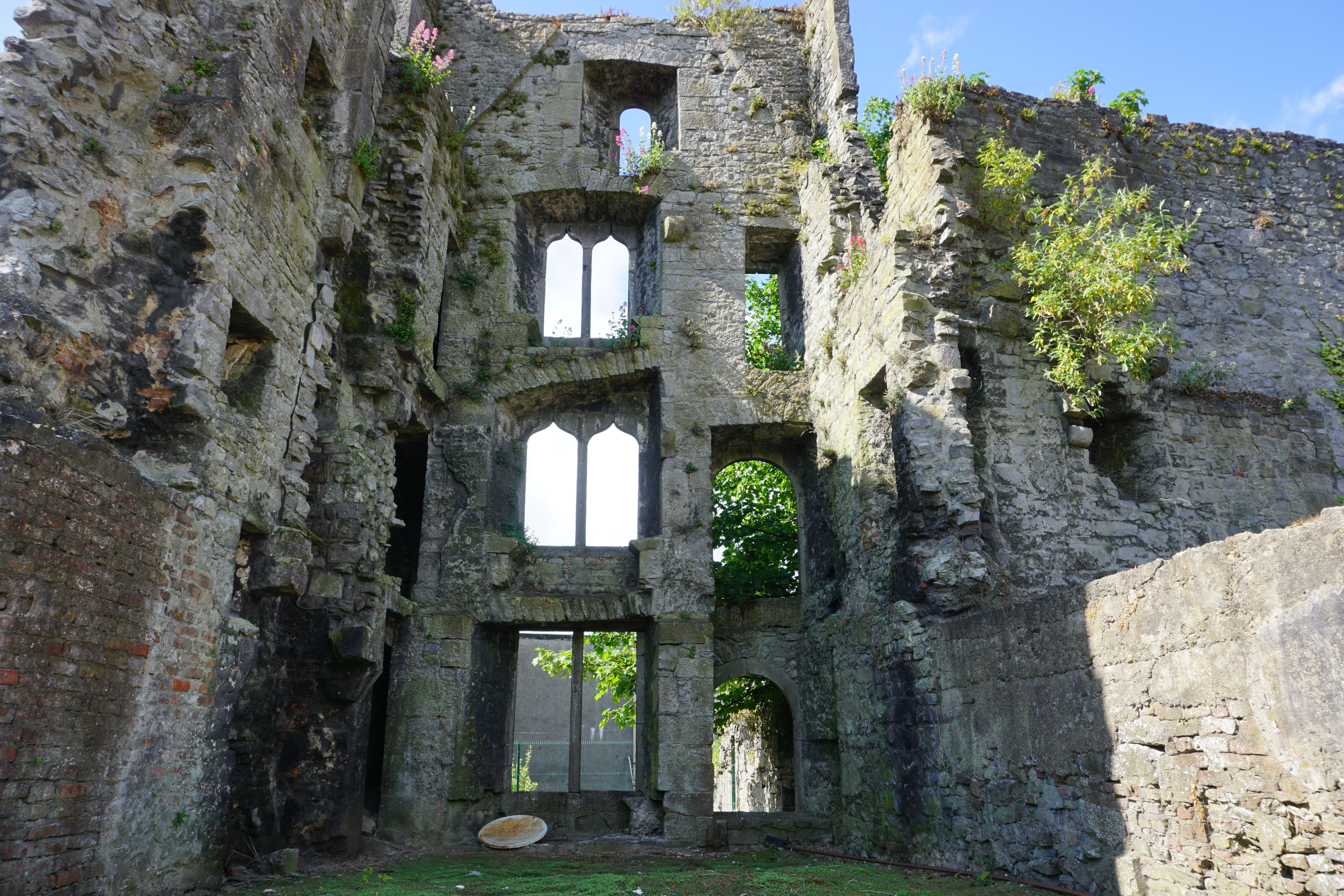
Interior view, with ogee windows

Fanning's Castle is located off Creagh Lane and Mary Street, opposite the tholsel, on King's Island.

== History ==
Fanning's Castle was built c. 1641 by Mayor of Limerick Dominic Fanning.

== Building ==
The walls of the tower house are of roughly squared limestone blocks of varying sizes. It was originally five storeys high, but only four storeys are now visible above ground level. The windows show ogee and mullions.

The tower house incorporated a turret staircase and battlements.
