= Rathard =

Archaeological site in County Limerick, Ireland

- An Ráth Ard (Irish)
- Location within Ireland
- 52.5177°N 8.3068°W
- Type: Ringfort
- Periods: Bronze or Iron Age (c. 2400 BC – AD 400)
- Location: Garryheakin, Oola, County Limerick, Ireland

Site notes
- Material: earth
- Elevation: 159 m (522 ft)
- Diameter: 43 m (141 ft)
- Owner: Private
- Public access: No

National monument of Ireland
- Official name: Rathard Castle-ringwork
- Reference no.: 555

Rathard is a ringfort (rath) and National Monument located in County Limerick, Ireland.

== Location ==
Rathard is located on an elevated site 3.5 km (2.2 mi) west-southwest of Oola.
