= Ballylanders fort =

Ringfort (rath) in County Limerick, Ireland

- Ráth Bhaile an Londraigh (Irish)
- Location within Ireland
- 52.380703°N 8.352385°W
- Type: ringfort
- Periods: Bronze or Iron Age (c. 2400 BC – AD 400)
- Location: Ballylanders, County Limerick, Ireland

Site notes
- Material: Earth
- Elevation: 134 m (440 ft)
- Diameter: 39 m (128 ft)
- Owner: private

National monument of Ireland
- Official name: Ballylanders
- Reference no.: 625

Ballylanders fort is a ringfort (rath) and National Monument located in County Limerick, Ireland.

== Location ==
Ballylanders fort is located 1 km (1,100 yd) north of Ballylanders.

== Description ==
Ballylanders fort is a univallate rath, with two outer rings visible as cropmarks. The remains of a fulacht fiadh are nearby.
