= Kilmallock Abbey =

Ruined Dominican friary in Limerick, Ireland

- Mainistir Chill Mocheallóg
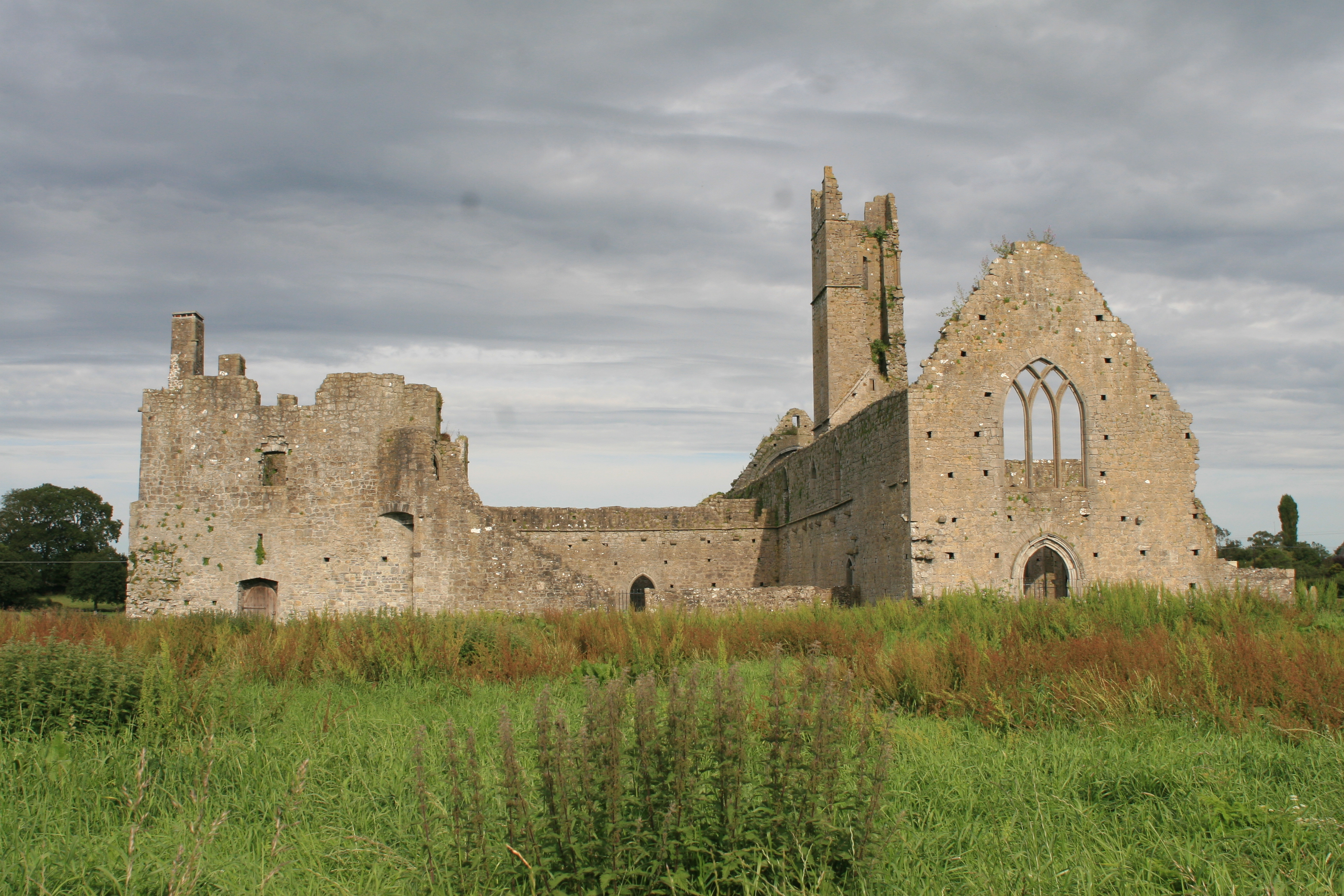

- Location within Ireland

Monastery information
- Other names: St. Saviour's Priory, Flacispaghe
- Order: Dominican
- Established: 1291
- Disestablished: 1790s
- Dedication: Jesus as Saviour

People
- Founder: Gilbert Fitzgerald

Architecture
- Heritage designation: Irish National Monument
- Style: Late Gothic

Site
- Location: Abbeyfarm, Kilmallock, County Limerick
- Coordinates: 52.402439°N 8.574891°W
- Public access: yes

Kilmallock Abbey (Irish: Mainistir Chill Mocheallóg) or St. Saviour's Priory is a 13th-century Dominican friary in the town of Kilmallock on the banks of the River Loobagh.

== History ==
The Abbey was established in 1291 when the Dominicans were invited to build a monastery by Gilbert Fitzgerald of the White Knights. The Fitzgeralds continued to be the main benefactors of the Abbey, including the expansion funded by Maurice Fitzgibbon (Fils de Gilbert) in 1320. The church dates from the 14th century, and was a simple rectangular building. A tower and ornate five-light east window were added to the church in the 15th century. The buildings have extensive carved details, including flower buds and human heads some of whom may represent the benefactors of the abbey.

The monastery was dissolved in 1541, with the monks returning in 1622. In 1645 the Papal Legate, Cardinal Giovanni Battista Rinuccini, visited during the Confederate Wars. It was sacked by Cromwellian forces led by Lord Inchiquin in 1648. Two monks were put to death in front of the altar. From then the friars operated clandestinely in the area, until the 1790s when the abbey was finally abandoned. There are a number of chalices that are associated with the abbey and its various benefactors.

== Gallery ==
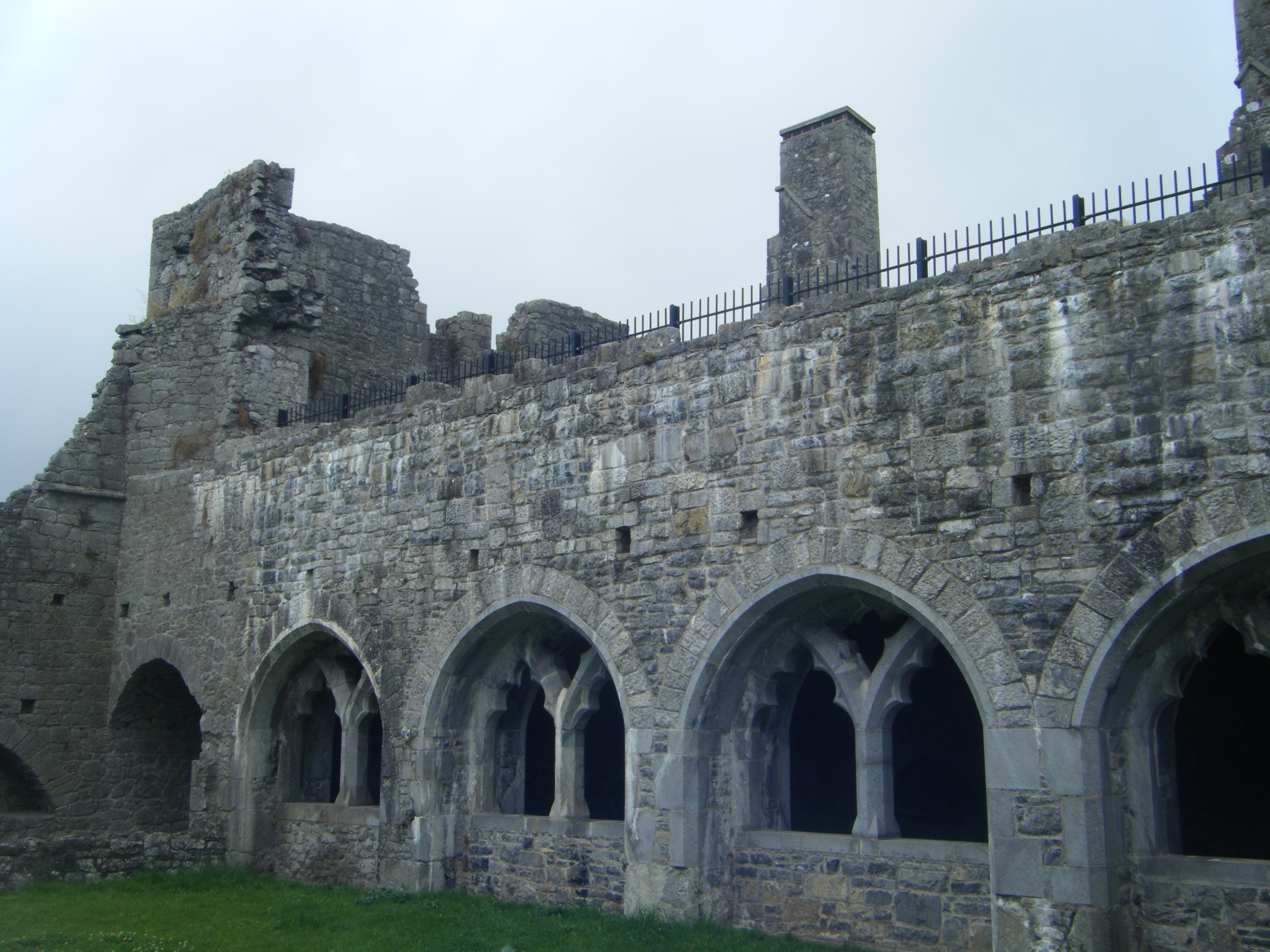
Cloister

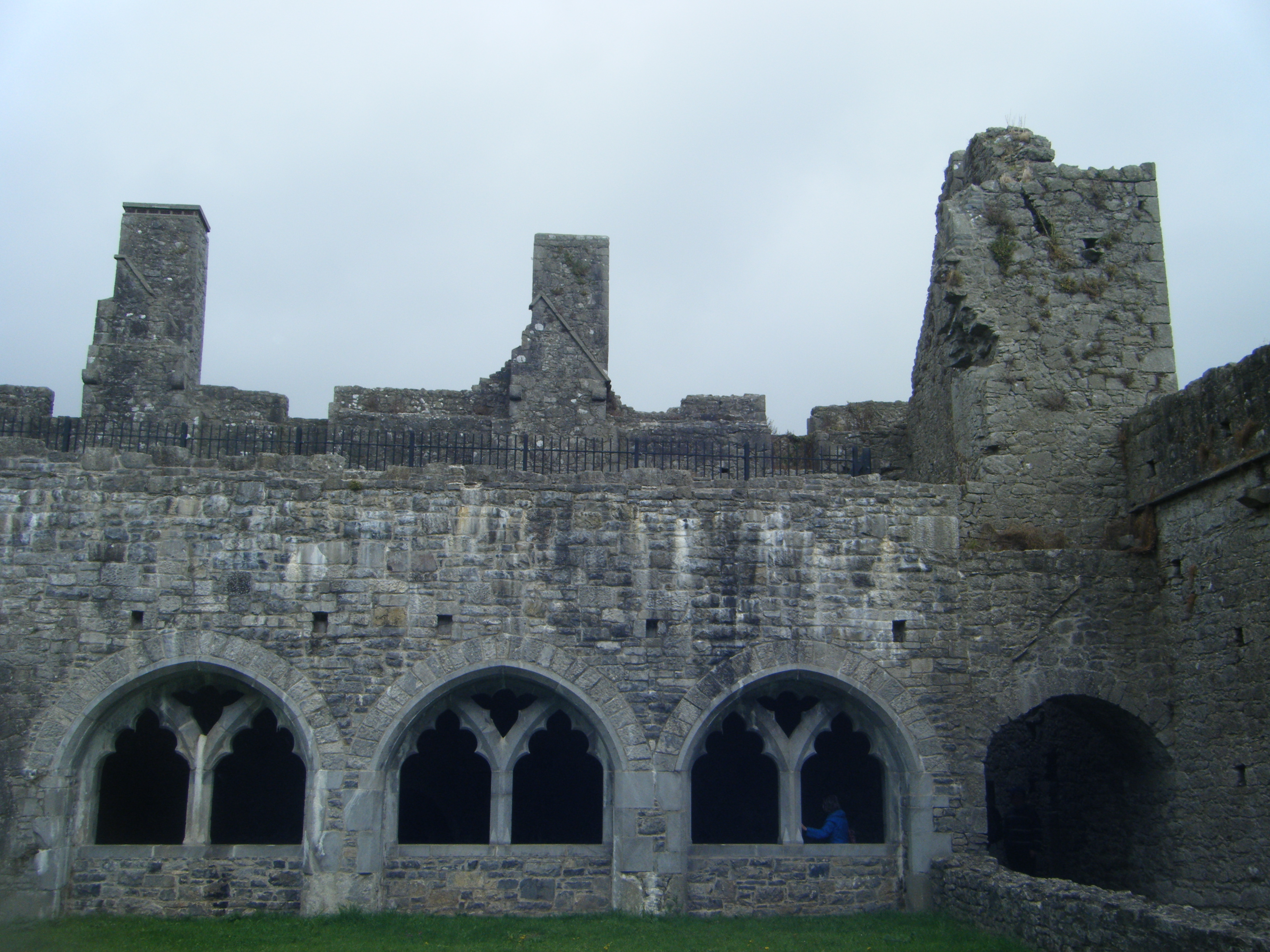
Cloister

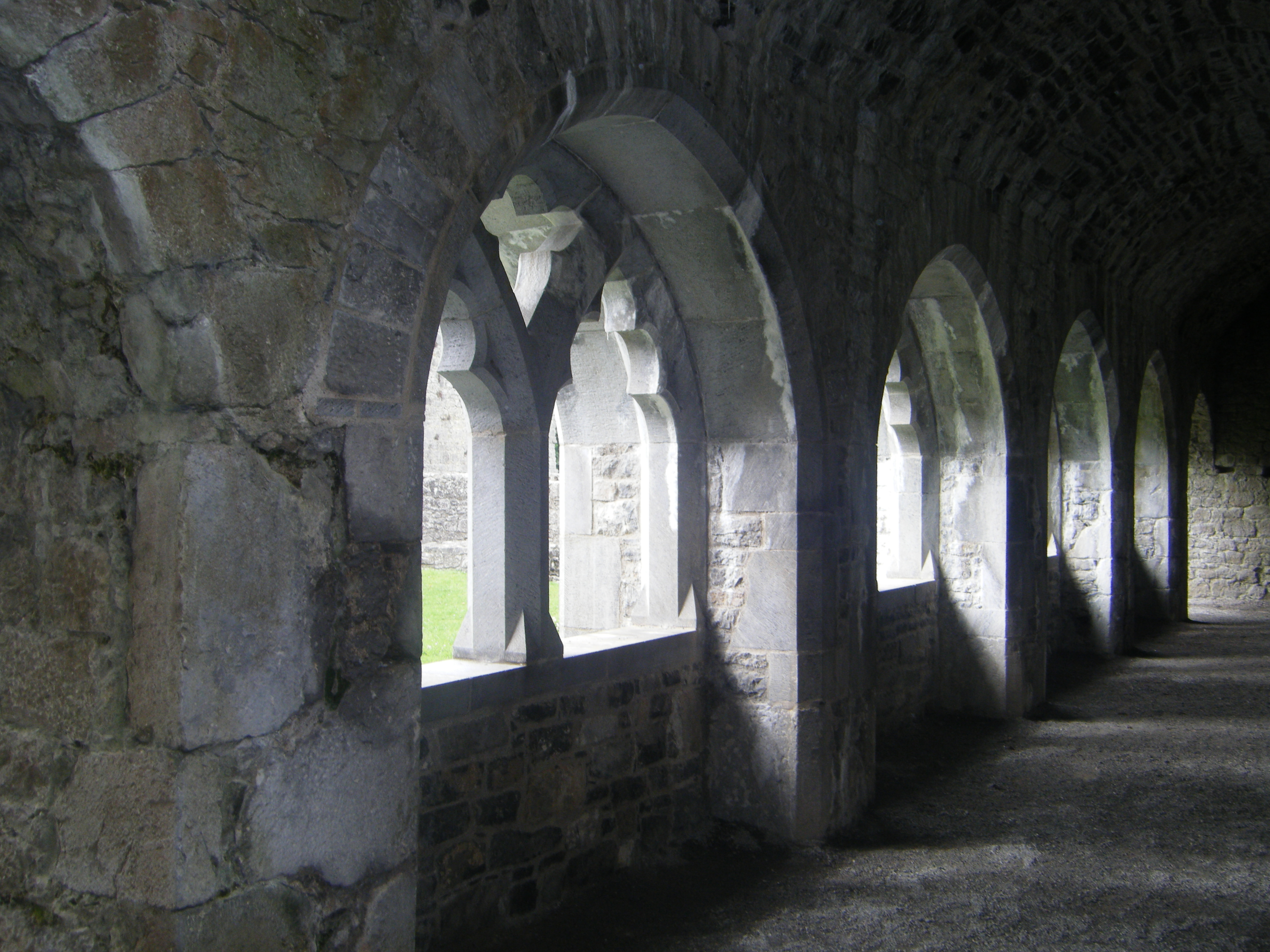
Cloister interior

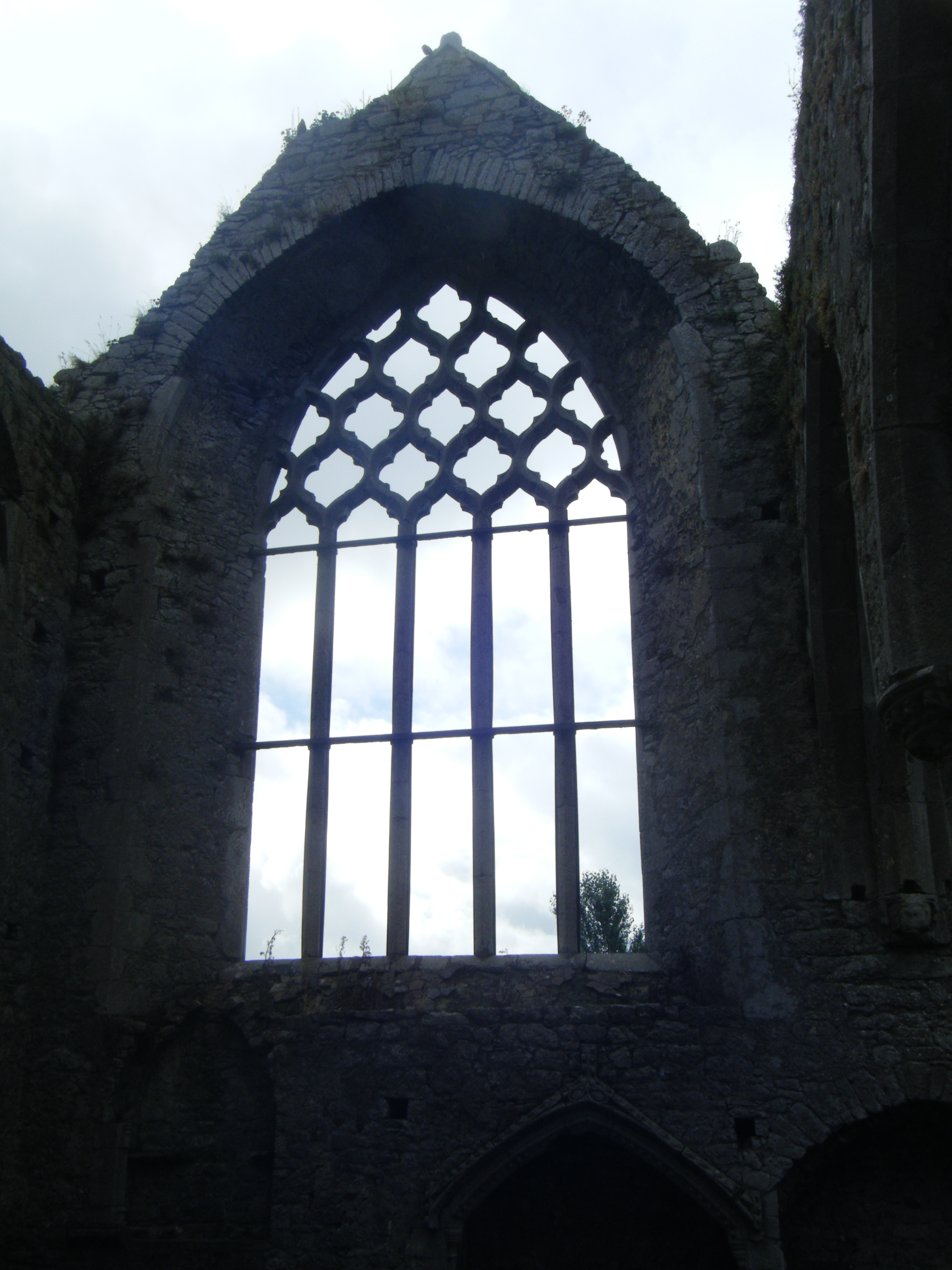
Window with tracery

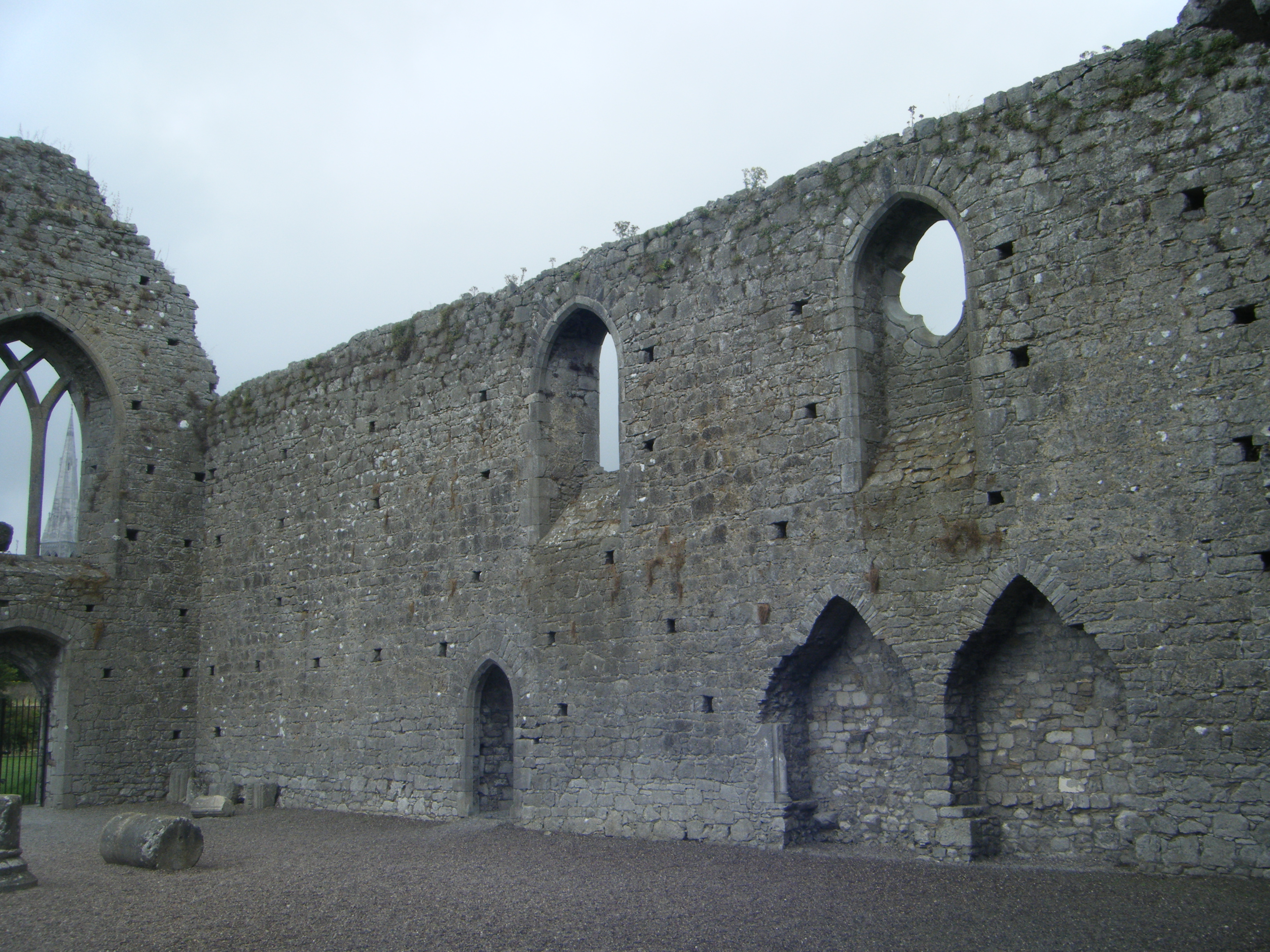
Church interior
