= Collegiate Church of St Peter and St Paul (Kilmallock) =

Medieval church in County Limerick, Ireland

Collegiate Church of St Peter and St Paul, Kilmallock
- Eaglais Choláisteach Naoimh Peadar agus Pól, Cill Mocheallóg
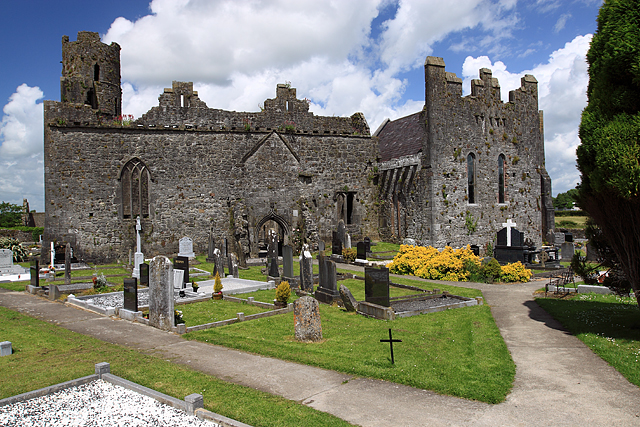

- Location within Ireland
- 52.401037°N 8.574547°W
- Location: Orr Street, Kilmallock, County Limerick
- Country: Ireland
- Denomination: Church of Ireland
- Previous denomination: Pre-Reformation Catholic

History
- Dedication: Saint Peter and Saint Paul

Architecture
- Functional status: inactive
- Years built: 1241

Specifications
- Length: 40 m (130 ft)

Administration
- Diocese: Limerick, Ardfert and Aghadoe
Designations
National monument of Ireland
- Official name: Collegiate Church of SS Peter & Paul
- Reference no.: 408

The Collegiate Church of St Peter and St Paul is a medieval collegiate church and a National Monument in Kilmallock, Ireland. The church is believed to have been built on the site of an ancient monastery.

== Location ==
The church is located on the south bank of the River Loobagh, to the north of Kilmallock's main street.

== History ==
The church was completed by 1241, on what was probably the site of an earlier monastery, founded by Mocheallóg c. AD 600. A round tower has its foundations here. It was dedicated to Peter and Paul in 1410.

The nave and transept were substantially altered in 1420 by Maurice Fitzgerald. It became a collegiate church in the 15th century.

Carved tombs from the 16th century are visible in the south transept.

The building was partly destroyed by Cromwell and was roofless since 1657 according to Samuel Lewis.

The church remained in use by the local Church of Ireland until a 1935 fire.

== Church ==
In the northwest corner of the nave is a tower which incorporates the stump of a round tower from the early monastery. The church which is dedicated to Saints Peter and Paul consisted of a nave and chancel with a south transept.

It has three aisles, a chancel and a north transept. There is a fine 13th century doorway in the south wall. The chancel has five lancet windows in embrasure.

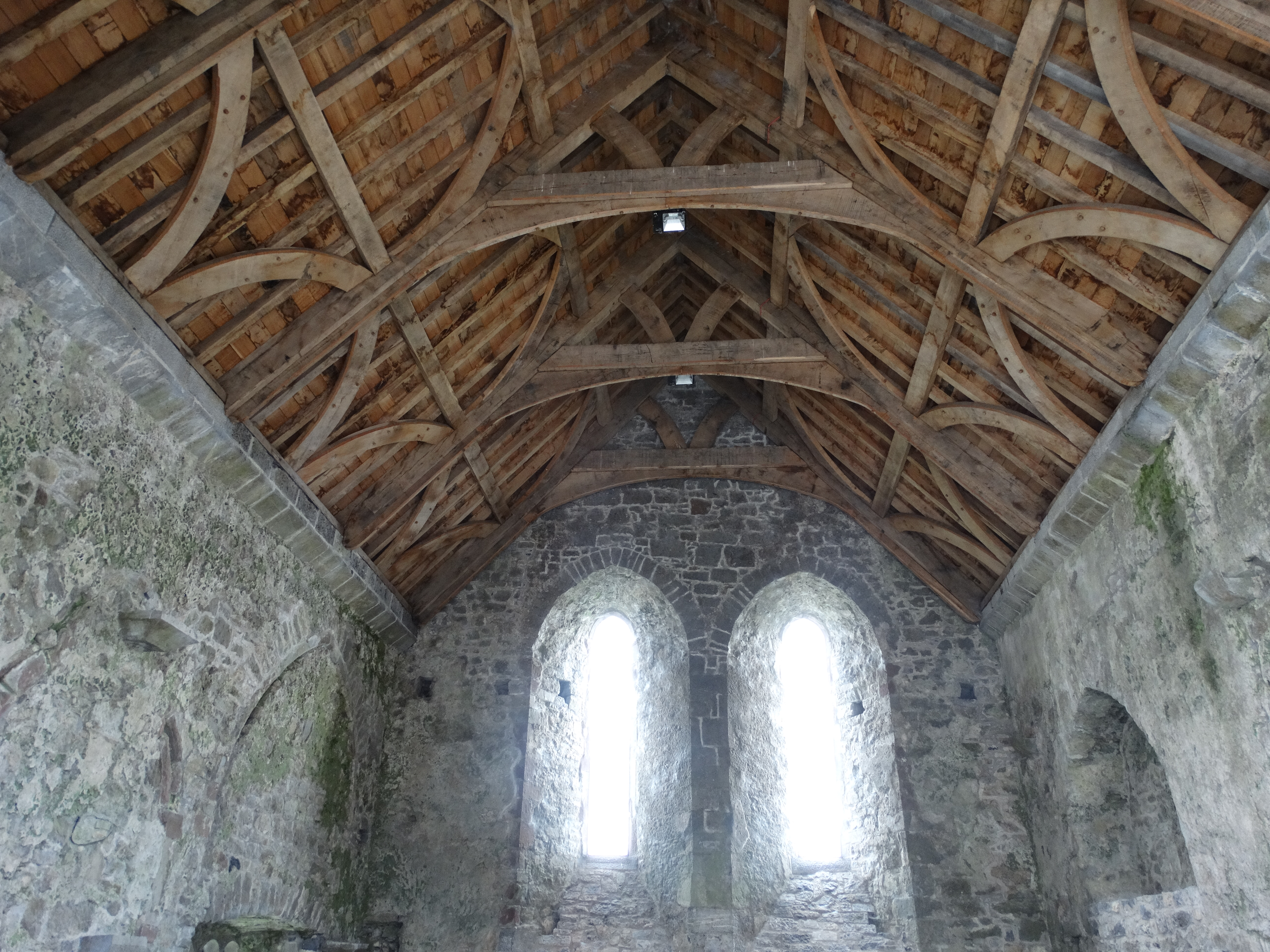
ceiling

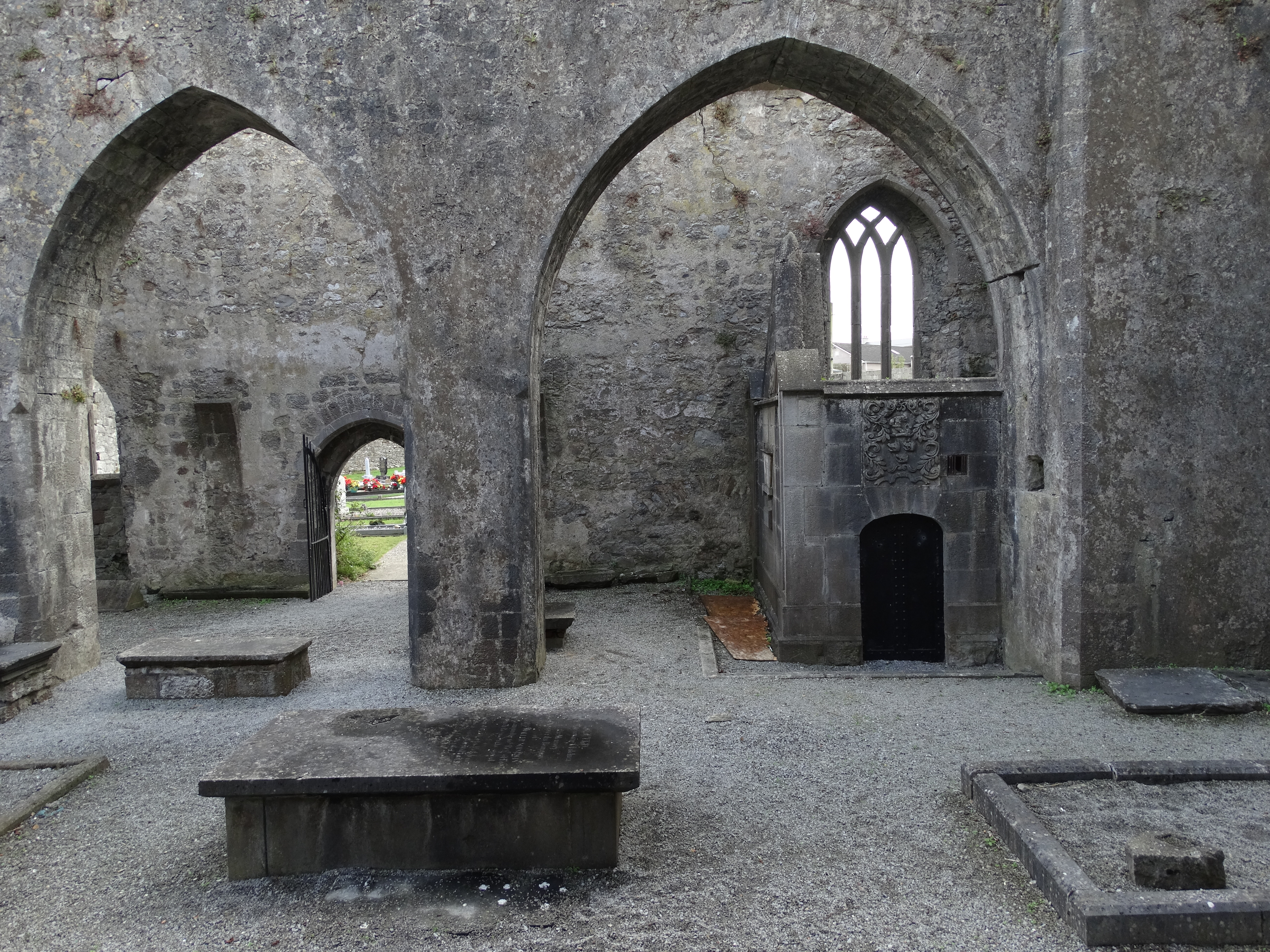
Arches

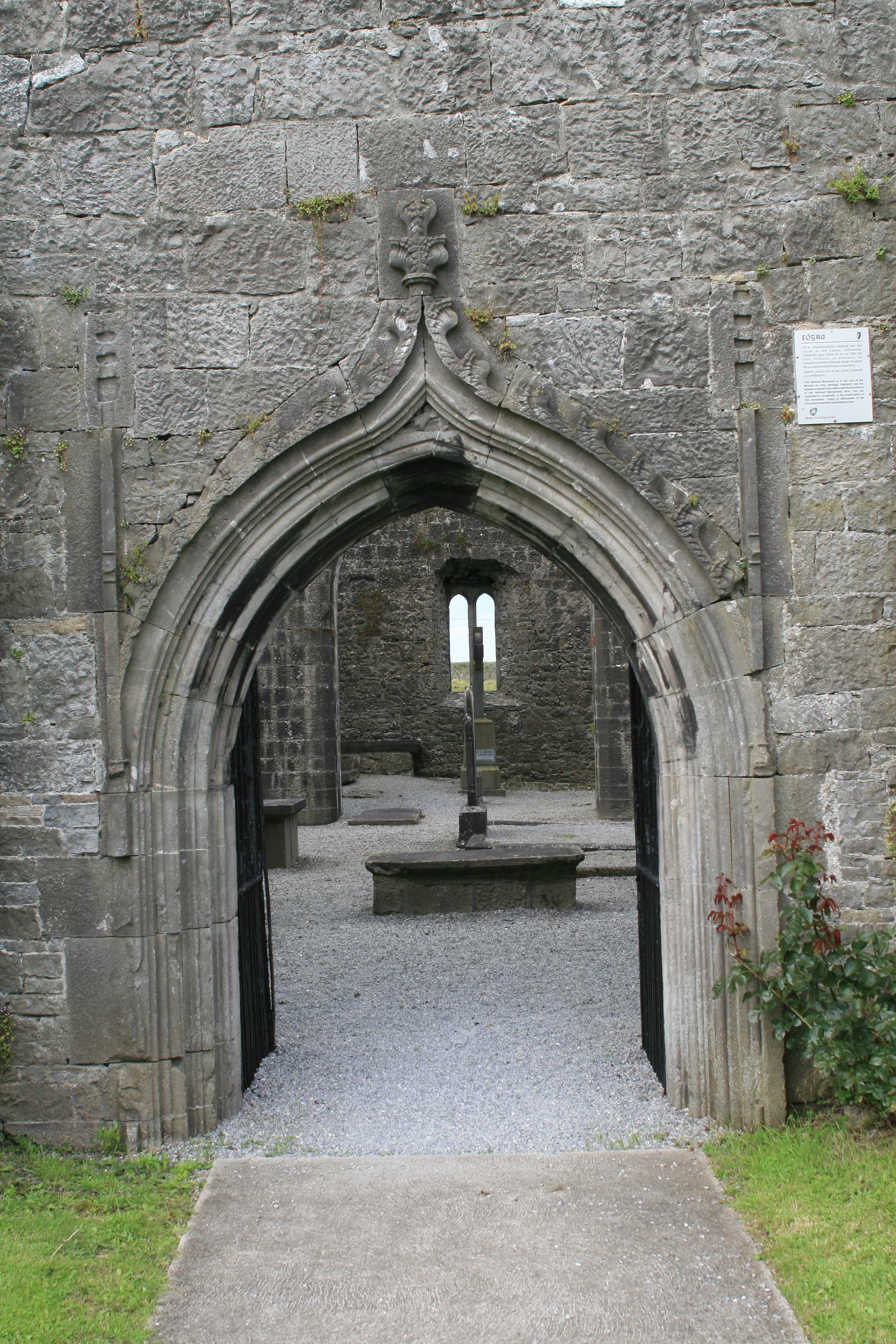
Doorway with arch

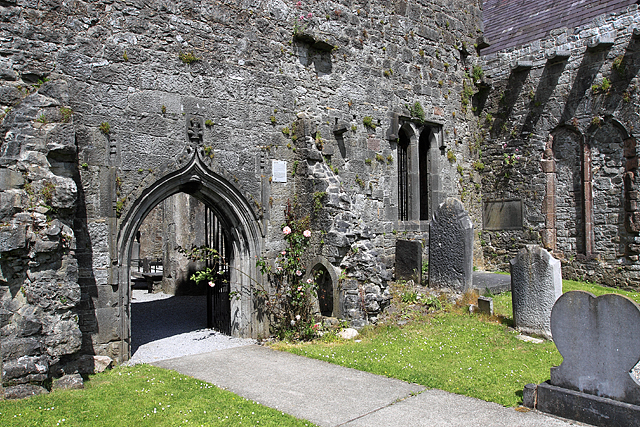

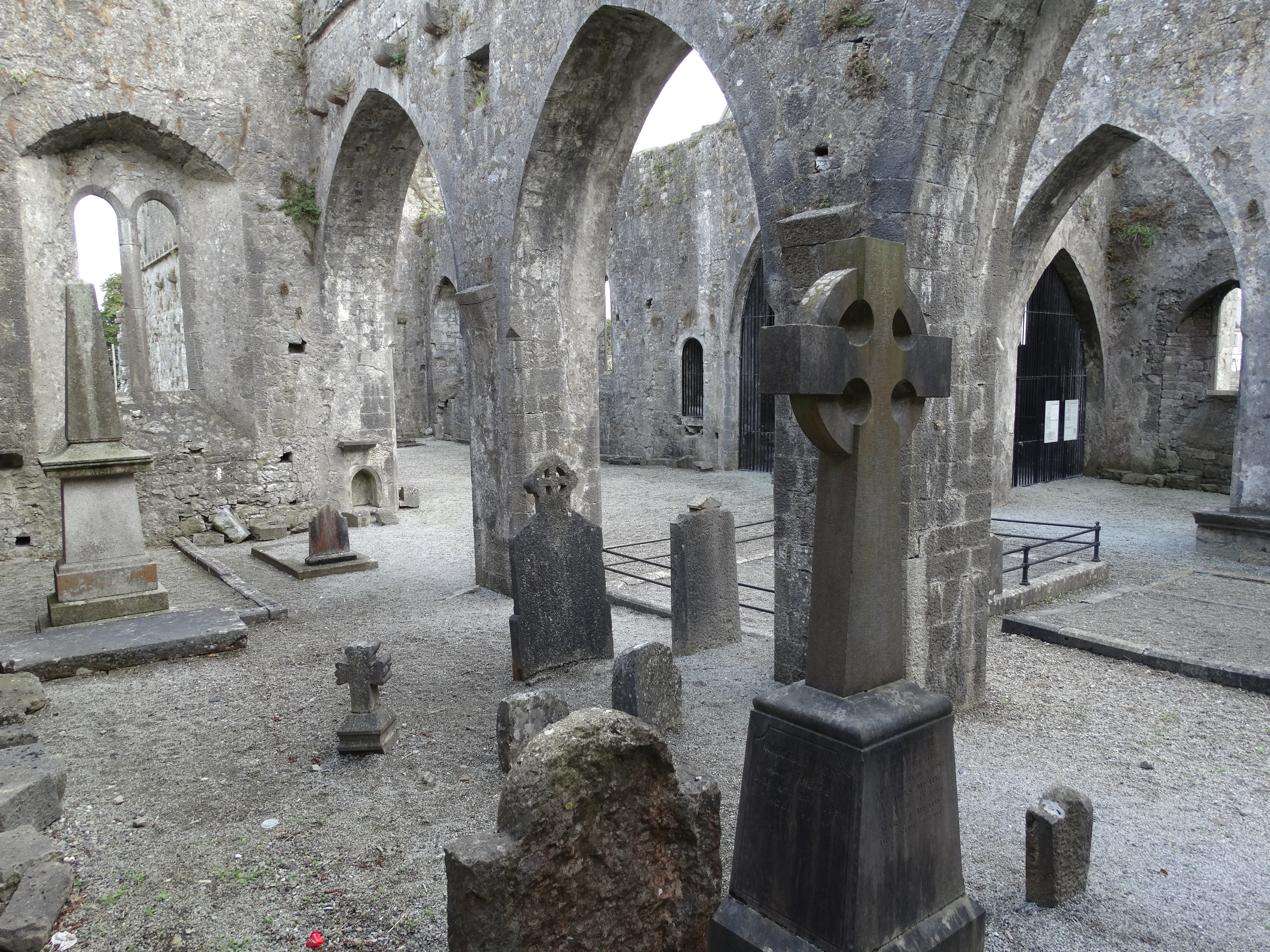

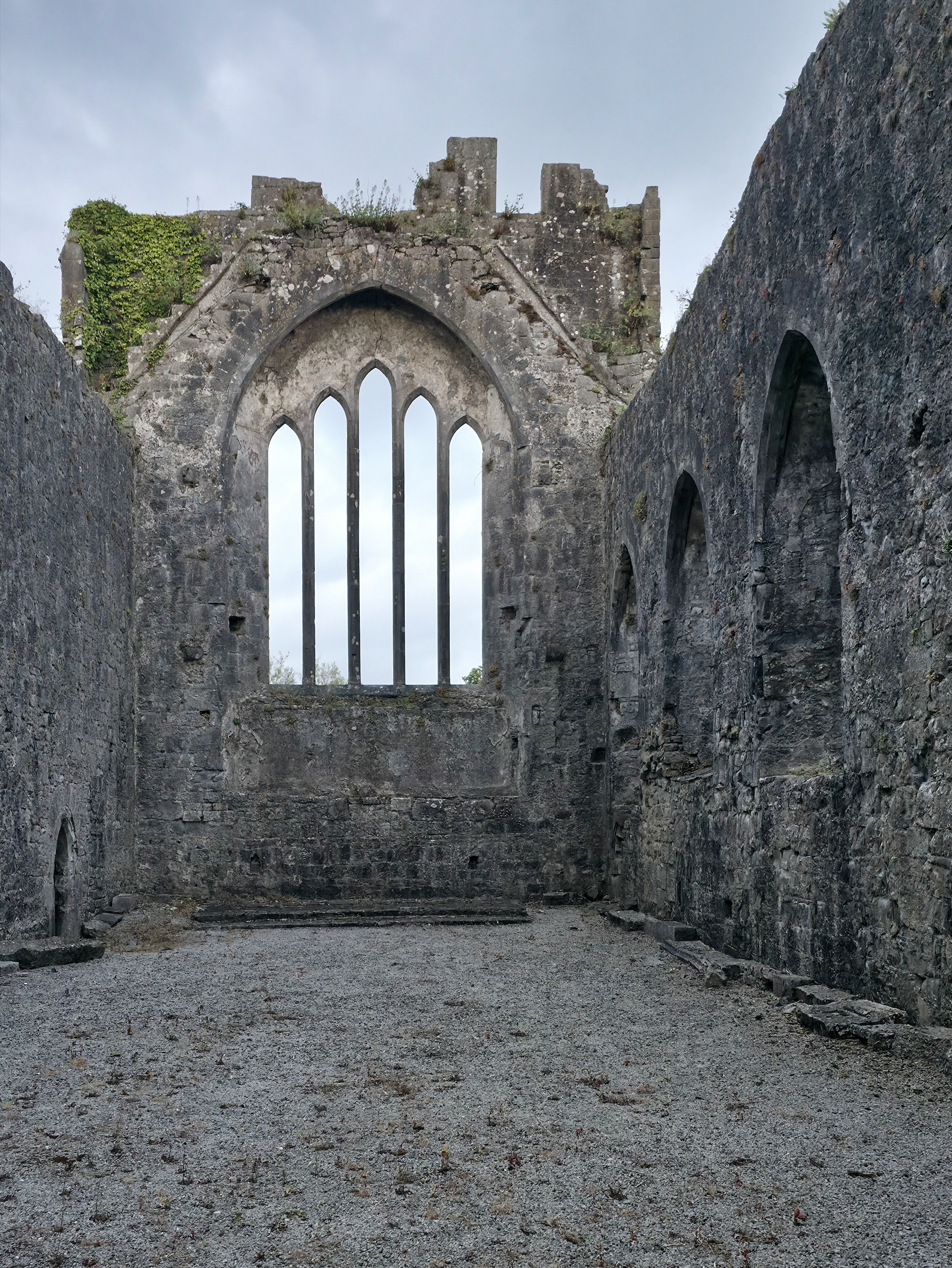
Chancel lancets
