= Fermoy (barony) =

Barony in County Cork, Ireland

Fermoy (Irish: Mainistir Fhear Maí; (Note: Fermoy (barony)) formerly also Armoy) is a historical barony in County Cork in Ireland. It is bordered by the baronies of Orrery and Kilmore to the north-west; Duhallow to the west; Barretts to the south-west; Barrymore to the south; Condons and Clangibbon to the east; and Coshlea, County Limerick to the north. It is bounded to the south by the Nagle Mountains and the valley of the Munster Blackwater. The Ballyhoura Mountains mark the northern boundary. A tributary of the Blackwater, the Awbeg has two branches in its upper stretches; one branch forms the northern boundary while the other near Buttevant, forms the western limit. To the east, lies another Blackwater tributary, the Funcheon. Anomalously, the namesake town of Fermoy is actually in the barony of Condons and Clangibbon. (Note: Fermoy (town)) The town with the greatest population in the former barony is Mallow (8,578 people per the 2006 census).

== History ==
Baronies were created after the Norman invasion of Ireland as administrative divisions of counties. They have been administratively obsolete since 1898.

In some cases, a barony corresponds to an earlier Gaelic túath, and the túath of Fermoy was under the O'Keeffe family in Gaelic times. Following the Norman invasion, the territory was divided, with the part corresponding to the modern barony claimed by the Flemings and by marriage passing to the Roches, who were styled Lords of Fermoy or Viscount Fermoy, and for whom Castletownroche is named. The other part of the túath, which included the Cistercian abbey of Fermoy at the site of the later town, went to the Condon family, as reflected in the modern barony name of Condons and Clangibbon. In the 1660s, land in the barony was granted to Sir Richard Gethin, 1st Baronet.

== Civil parishes and settlements ==
Settlements in the barony include Ballindangan, (Note: Fermoy: population centres) Ballydahin, Ballyhooly, (Note: Fermoy: towns) Castletownroche, Doneraile, Glanworth, Killavullen, Knockraha, Mallow, Newtown Ballyhay, New Twopothouse, and Shanballymore;

Civil parishes wholly or partly in the barony are: Ardskeagh, Ballydeloughy, Ballyhay, Ballyhooly, Bridgetown, Castletownroche, Caherduggan, Carrigdownane, Carrigleamleary, Clenor, Derryvillane, Doneraile, Dunmahon, Farahy, Glanworth, Imphrick, Kilcrumper, Kilcummer, Kildorrery, Kilgullane, Killathy, Killeenemer, Kilquane, Litter, Mallow, Monanimy, Mourneabbey, Rahan, St. Nathlash, Templeroan, and Wallstown. (Note: Fermoy: civil parishes)

== See also ==
- List of civil parishes of County Cork
- List of townlands of the barony of Fermoy in County Cork
- Baron Fermoy
