= Castletownroche =

Village in County Cork, Ireland

Castletownroche Baile Chaisleáin an Róistigh
- Village
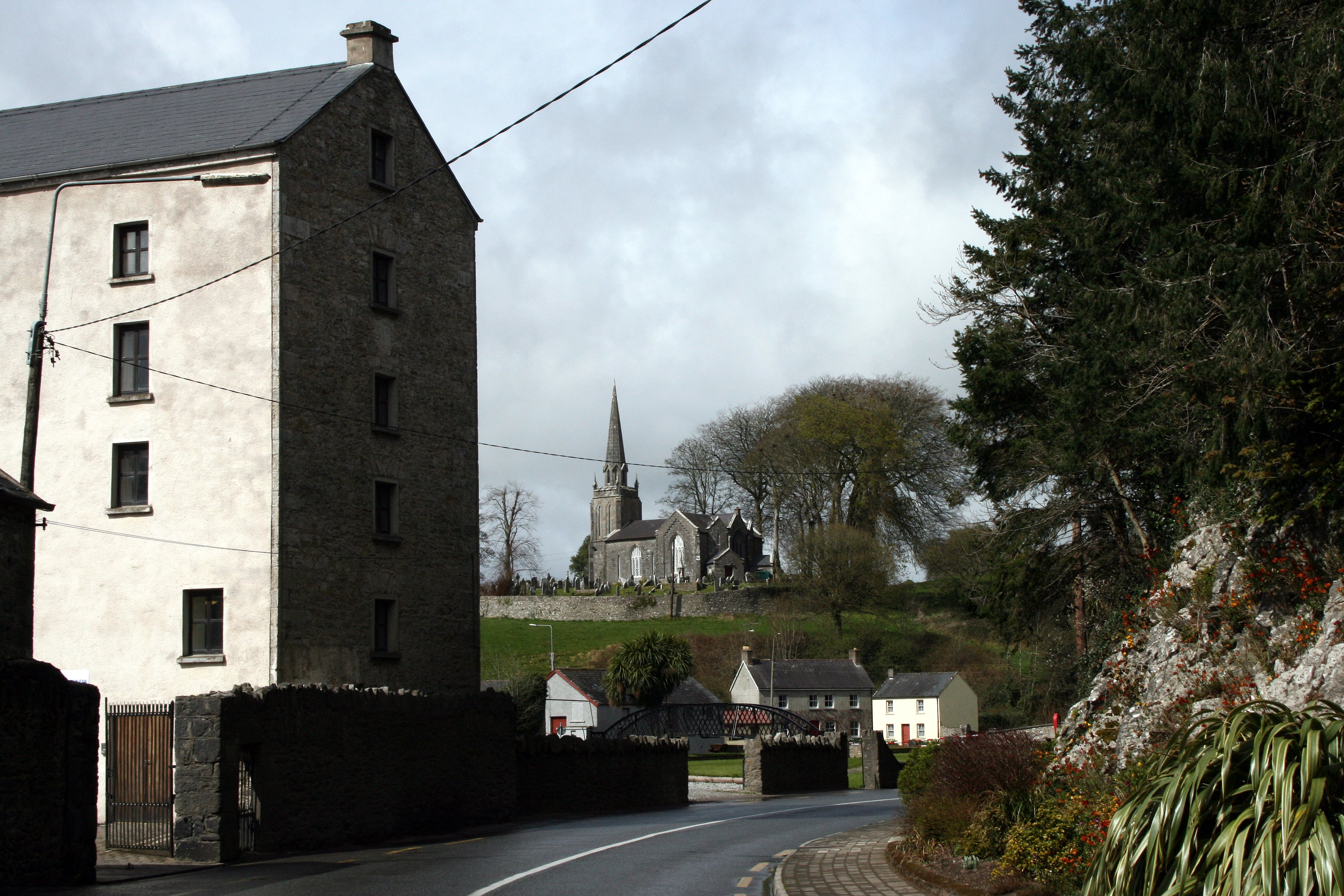
- Former mill buildings and Saint Mary's Church of Ireland church at Castletownroche

- Location in Ireland
- Coordinates: 52°10′37″N 8°27′32″W
- Country: Ireland
- Province: Munster
- County: County Cork

Population (2022)
  - Total: 509
- Time zone: UTC+0 (WET)
  - Summer (DST): UTC-1 (IST (WEST))
- Irish grid reference: R682024

Castletownroche (Irish: Baile Chaisleáin an Róistigh) is a townland, village, and civil parish in the barony of Fermoy, County Cork, Ireland. It is located on the N72 national secondary road. In ancient times, it was known in Irish as Dún Chruadha, meaning Cruadha's Fort. Castletownroche is located on the River Awbeg in the Blackwater Valley about eight miles (13 km) from Mallow. Castletownroche is within the Cork East Dáil constituency.

== History ==
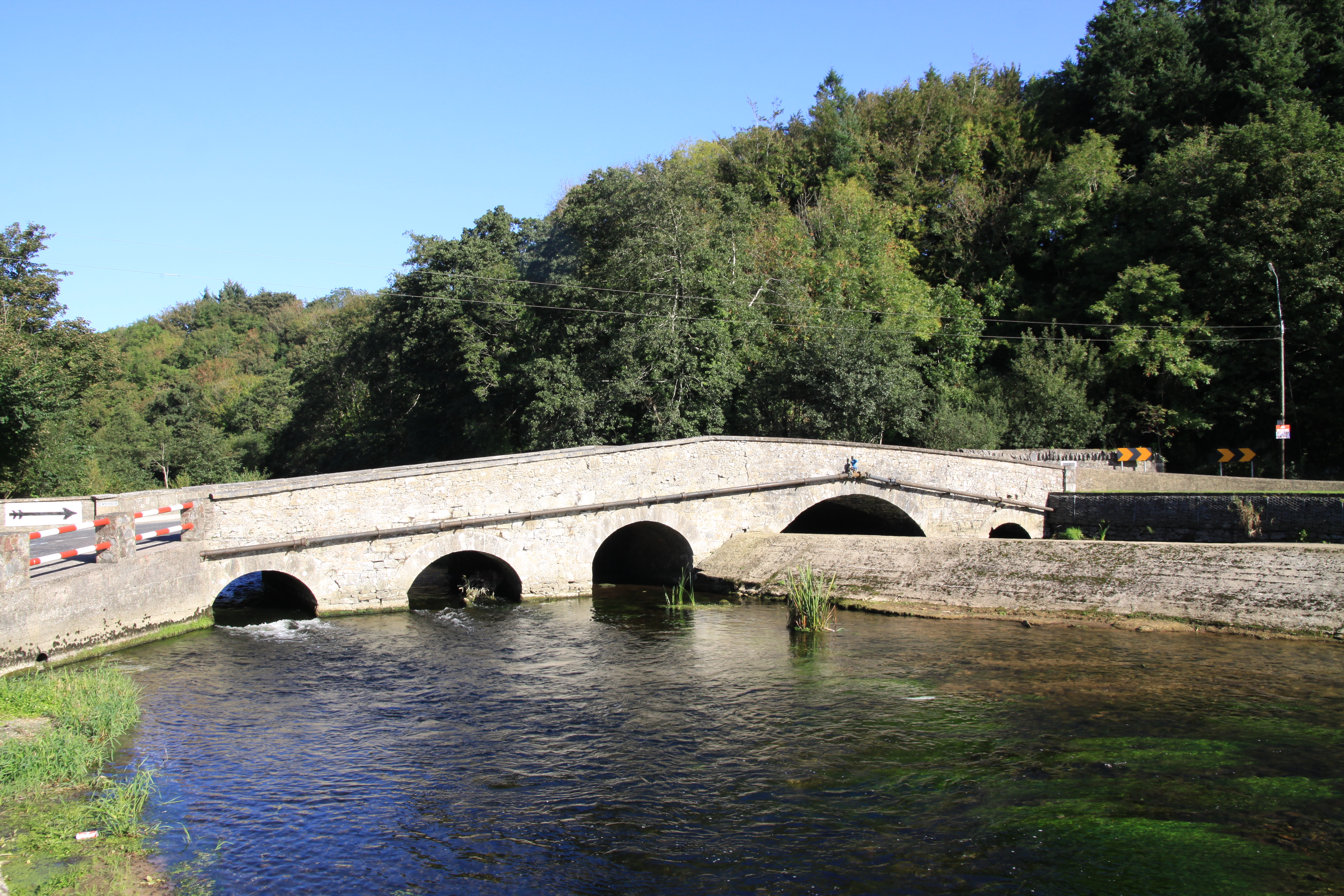
Bridge at Castletownroche, rebuilt in the 1830s, which spans the River Awbeg

=== de la Roche ===
The first historical record about Castletownroche is from the late 13th century when the Anglo-Norman family of de la Roche established a fortress here. They were descendants of Richard FitzGodebert (Richard, son of Godebert) who came with Strongbow to Ireland. Their family had a castle in Pembrokeshire that was built upon an outcrop of stone and they became known as FitzGodebert de la Roch (FitzGodebert of the Rock). From that, their Hiberno-Norman descendants were known as "de la Roch" and finally, Roche. It is from this element, and the castle they built here in County Cork, that Castletownroche gets its name.

=== Castle Widenham ===
Like many of the Anglo-Norman families that arrived as invaders, the Roches eventually became loyal to interests different from those of the English crown, allied with the Gaelic aristocracy, and came to be regarded as rebels. After centuries of sporadic conflict, the Roches were routed from their castle. In 1666 Lieutenant Colonel John Widenham, who had lived in County Clare, got the castle as a reward. Castletownroche was renamed Castle Widenham.

The Widenhams rebuilt the Roche's medieval castle in its present form, utilizing the old keep as a principal part. In time it passed to the Widenham-Creaghs, and then by marriage to H. Mitchell Smyth, one of the Smyths of Ballinatray. The Nordstrom family of Germany, the owners since 1991 of what is now what they call Blackwater Castle, are unrelated to this line. The property has been restored to accommodate commercial guests.

=== Nazi spy ===
Shortly before Christmas 1942, as World War II was raging on continental Europe, a tall, well-built man in his early thirties appeared in Castletownroche, gave his name as Oskar Metzke, and said that he was a Czech who was discharged from the British Army as being medically unfit. He produced identification, but when searched by the Garda was found to possess a map with aerial views of the local countryside, a compass, a combined torch and fountain pen and a Luger pistol.

While the Garda were deciding what to do with him, he was left in the care of the barracks' orderly. William Mannix, the son of that officer, wrote the following account:

I was a very young boy at the time, but the story was often repeated to me by my father. Oskar Metzke was sitting quietly by the fireplace, when he asked Garda Mannix if he could eat some of his bread and cheese. On receiving permission, he walked over to the table where it lay. He started to eat his frugal meal, then turned his back on the Garda. Seconds later Oskar Metzke was in convulsions, it was obvious that he had swallowed something lethal and my father, Garda Mannix, did his utmost to retrieve it from his mouth, but already the German was unconscious. Within a matter of minutes Metzke was dead...the subsequent inquest [by] Coroner Nagle of Buttevant revealed that Oskar Metzke had taken a deadly poison, cyanide of potassium.

Some days later, the funeral of Oskar Metzke took place at the old churchyard of St Mary's, situated on a hill overlooking the River Awbeg. Many people from the village attended the simple ceremony. Some years later his body was exhumed and subsequently buried in a German cemetery at Glencree in County Wicklow. It was later confirmed that the Nazis had several secret plans involving Ireland, such as Operation Osprey. However, the identity and motives of the man calling himself Oskar Metzke remain unknown.

A song commemorating Metzke's arrival in Castletownroche, Oskar Metzke German Spy, by Tim O'Riordan is featured on the album Taibhse released in 2018.

=== National Ploughing Championships ===
The annual National Ploughing Championships were held in the area in 1999.

== Places of interest ==
Notable buildings in Castletownroche include Blackwater Castle and the ruins of Bridgetown Abbey, a 13th-century Augustinian monastery of the priors of St. Victor. A holy well is situated on the grounds of Blackwater Castle, on the bank of the River Awbeg. A Sheela na Gig carving once stood next to this well.

Annes Grove Gardens, laid out in the early twentieth century around an eighteenth-century house, are near Castletownroche. Many of the rhododendrons within the gardens were collected on expedition by Frank Kingdon-Ward. Behind the house, paths pass limestone cliffs and overlook Awbeg River and lily ponds. While originally open to the public, the gardens were closed for a number of years. In 2016, it was proposed that the gardens be taken over by the Office of Public Works (OPW). The gardens reopened to the public in April 2022, with restoration work continuing.

== Transport ==
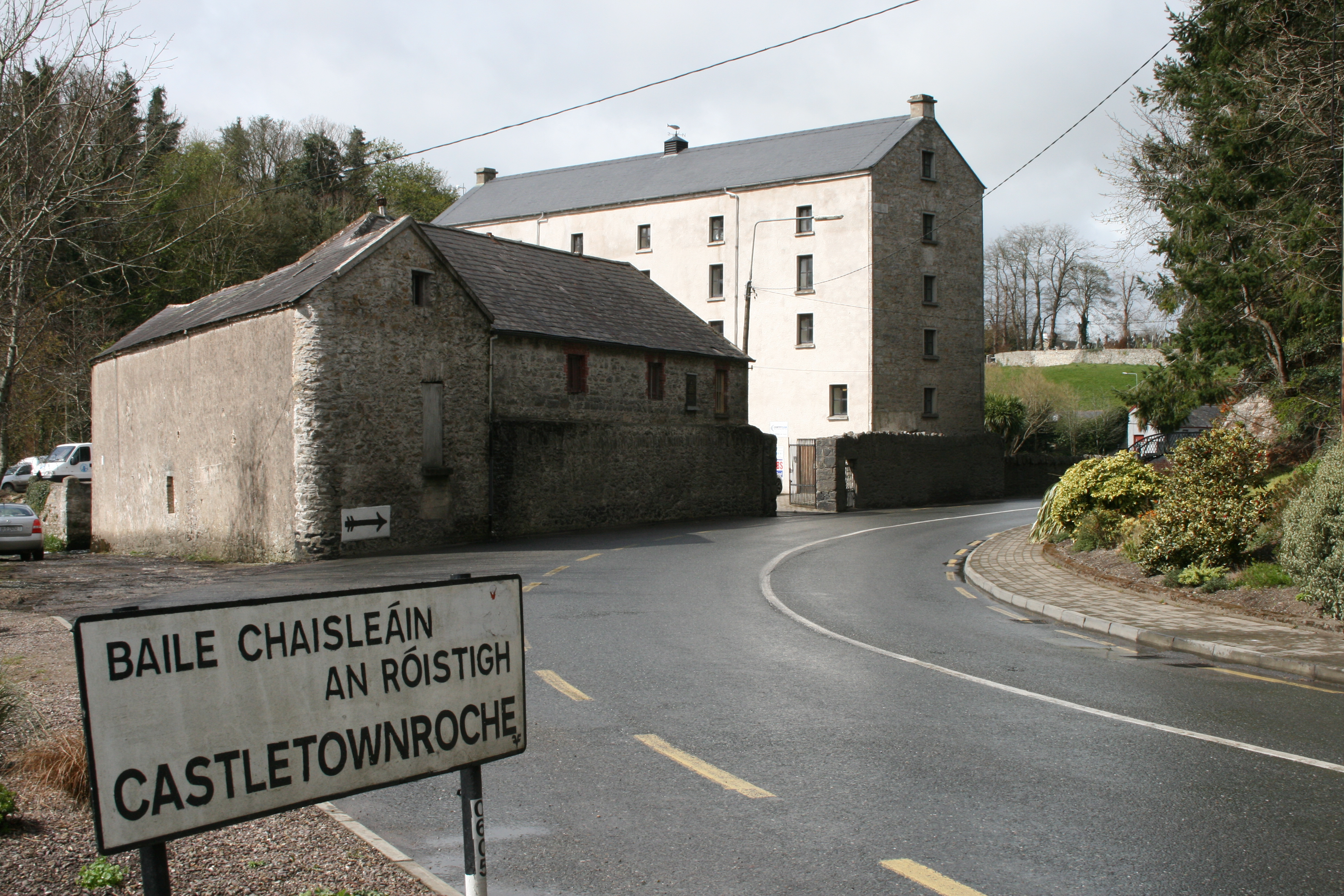
Approaching Castletownroche on the N72 road

Castletownroche railway station opened on 1 May 1861, but finally closed on 27 March 1967. This railway station is close to Killavullen and served both villages.

== Townlands ==
The 1826 Tithe Applotment for the civil parish of Castletownroche (Diocese of Cloyne) lists the following townlands:

- Ardkillihien (Ard Coilchín now Naglesborough)
- Ballyveelick (Baile Uilleac)
- Castletown
- Gurraneachoel (Garrán an Cheoil)
- Lisnagourneen (Lios na gCuirníneach or Lisnagoorneen)
- Loughrowane (Loch an Ruáin now Lougharuane)
- Parkacunna (Páirc an Chonnaidh)
- Rathacarthen (Ráth na Ceártan now Rathnacarton)
- Skenakilly (Sceach na Cille now Skenakilla)
- Scrarour (An Scraith Ramhar)

== People ==
- James Deane, professional drift driver and Formula D champion.
- Thomas Hunter, participant in the Easter Rising and TD in First Dáil, was born in Castletownroche.
- Thomas P. Keenan, songwriter and composer, is buried in this village. According to Fáilte Ireland, his song "The Old Rustic Bridge by the Mill" takes its name from a structure near a mill in Castletownroche.
- Jonjo O'Neill, former race horse jockey and horse trainer, is a native of Castletownroache.
- Richard John Uniacke, lawyer, politician, and Attorney General of Nova Scotia, was born in Castletownroche.

== See also ==
- List of towns and villages in Ireland
