= Lisnagourneen =

Townland in County Cork, Ireland

Coordinates: 52.202°N 8.424°W

Lisnagourneen or Lisnagoorneen (Irish: Lios na gCuirníneach) is a small townland between Castletownroche and Glanworth in County Cork, Ireland. Located in the historical barony of Fermoy, it has an area of approximately 2.6 square kilometres (1.0 sq mi). The Archaeological Survey of Ireland records a possible small ringfort site in the townland. Lisnagoorneen had a population of 47 people as of the 2011 census.

== See also ==
- List of townlands of the barony of Fermoy
