= Townlands of Fermoy =

List of townlands in the Fermoy civil parish

Fermoy is a civil parish in the barony of Condons and Clangibbon, County Cork, Ireland, that contains 10 townlands. These townlands, many of which are within the town of Fermoy itself, include:

== Ballyarthur ==
Ballyarthur (Baile Artúir) is a townland located just north of Fermoy town (Carrignagrohera specifically), with a size of 127.66 acres (0.5166 km^{2}). It is located west of Lisnasallagh, a townland in the civil parish of Kilcrumper. Ballyarthur contains only a few houses and fields.

== Ballynoe ==
Ballynoe (An Baile Nua) is a townland just south of Duntahane. It contains the north-east part of Corrin Woods and is located slightly west of Corrin Cross. Ballynoe spans 146.02 acres (0.59 km^{2}) and is not to be confused with the village of Ballynoe, Kinnatalloon which is located a while east of Fermoy.

== Carrignagrohera ==
Carrignagrohera (Carraig na gCrochairí) is a townland in the north of Fermoy town that spans 331.86 acres (1.34 km^{2}). It contains several supermarkets and other shops. It is also the home of Fermoy GAA and rugby clubs. In the centre of the townland is Christ Church, the Anglican church of Fermoy and located just southwest of the church is Fermoy Park and Leisure Centre.

== Castlehyde ==
Castlehyde (Carraig an Éidigh) is a townland and estate located slightly west of Fermoy town that spans 79.98 acres (0.3237 km²). Its manor house, Castlehyde House, had been the ancestral home of Douglas Hyde's family and is today one of several houses owned by Irish dancer, Michael Flatley.

== Coolcarron ==
Coolcarron (Cúil an Chairn) is a townland located just south of Fermoy town that spans 352.08 acres (1.4248 km²), from a supermarket in the north to Corrin Cross in the south. The M8 toll booth is located just east of Coolcarron.

== Cullenagh ==
Cullenagh (Cuileannach) is a townland just west of Ballynoe, Fermoy that spans 300.43 acres (1.2158 km²). It is home to a driving range in the north and a skip hire service in the south. It is just north of Fermoy Golf Club and contains the west of Corrin Woods.

== Duntahane ==
Duntahane (Dún Táithín) is a townland that contains the western part of Fermoy town. It spans 463.19 acres (1.8745 km²). In addition to several businesses, there are hundreds of houses in the townland. There is a primary school, Gaelscoil de Hide, and a secondary school, Coláiste an Chraoibhín, which has a large pitch out the back that it shares with Grange-Fermoy Athletics Club.

== Fermoy ==
Fermoy is the largest townland in the civil parish spanning 712.63 acres (2.8839 km²) and the namesake for the town of Fermoy. It contains most of the town's schools including Loreto Catholic Secondary School, St Colman's College, Bishop Murphy Memorial School and Fermoy Educate Together National School. Its Pearse Square is home to Fermoy's Allied Irish Bank, Supermac's, two cafés, a newsagents and a school supplies store. Located in the Fermoy townland is St Patrick's Roman Catholic Church, the tallest building in the town, and the northern section of St Colman's Pitch.

== Grange East ==
Grange East (An Ghráinseach Thoir) is a townland just west of Carrignagrohera that spans 244.19 acres (0.9882 km²). Grange East is the home of Grange Stud, a horse breeder in the west of the townland. The townland is also the home of Fermoy F.C.'s soccer pitch, a child amusement centre and a real estate consultant.

== Grange West ==
Grange West (An Ghráinseach Thiar) is a townland located between Castlehyde and Grange East. Grange West is the slightly larger of the two Granges at 271.15 acres (1.0973 km²). It is home to Grange National School and marks the beginning of the Glanworth Road.
