= Ballyveelick =

Ballyveelick Irish: Baile Uilleac
- Townland
- Ballyveelick shown within Ireland
- Coordinates: 52°11′04″N 8°31′10″W
- Country: Ireland
- County: County Cork
- Barony: Fermoy
- Civil parish: Castletownroche

Area
  - Total: 74 ha (183 acres)

Ballyveelick (Irish: Baile Uilleac) is a townland in the civil parish of Castletownroche, County Cork, Ireland. It is 0.7 square kilometres (0.3 sq mi) in area, and had a population of 5 people as of the 2011 census.

Evidence of ancient settlement in the townland include the remains of a number of burnt mounds and ringforts.

== See also ==
- List of townlands of the barony of Fermoy
