= Rockmills =

Village in County Cork, Ireland

Rockmills Carraig an Mhuileann
- Village
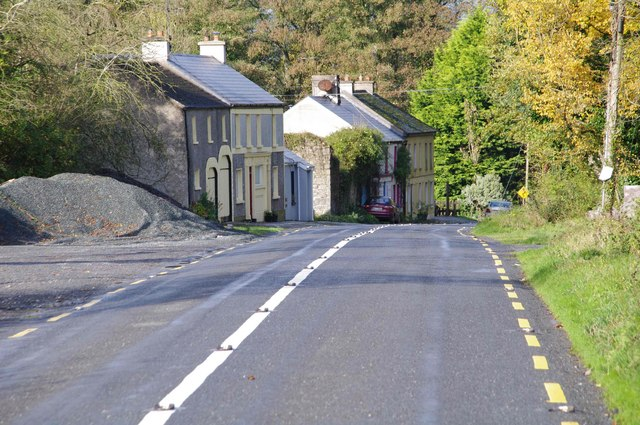
- The R512 road passes through Rockmills

- Location in Ireland
- Coordinates: 52°13′21″N 08°24′46″W
- Country: Ireland
- Province: Munster
- County: County Cork
- Time zone: UTC+0 (WET)
  - Summer (DST): UTC-1 (IST (WEST))

Rockmills (Irish: Carraig an Mhuileann) is a small rural village located in the parish of Kildorrery, in the Avondhu region of County Cork, Ireland. The village derives its name from the large mill that once operated on the banks of the River Funshion, that runs to the east of the village. Rockmills is part of the Cork East (Dáil constituency).

The flour mills was the scene of a sharp fight during the Whiteboy risings, when it was attacked to capture the money kept on hands for the purchase of wheat. The assailants were repulsed with the loss of seven lives.

A freestanding three-stage tower and spire exists, built in 1812. It is the former west end of St Nathlash Church of Ireland, the rest of the building was demolished in 1889.

== Transport ==
Local Link route 245C serves Rockmills several times a day Mondays to Saturdays inclusive linking it to Fermoy, Mitchelstown, Kildorrery and Glanworth.

== See also ==
- List of towns and villages in Ireland
