= Pamela Drew =

British artist (1910-1989)

- Born: 11 September 1910; Burnley, England
- Died: 11 June 1989 (aged 78)
- Education: Grosvenor School of Modern Art
- Known for: Painter of marine and aviation subjects
- Spouses: Baron Rathdonnell (m. 1937–1959, his death); Major H.C. Massy (m. 1961)

Pamela Drew (11 September 1910 – 11 June 1989) was a British artist known for her paintings of marine and aviation subjects. Although Drew was born in the north of England she spent considerable periods of her career in Ireland.

== Biography ==
Drew was born in Burnley and was the eldest daughter of John M. Drew, a well-known calico painter. At an early age Pamela Drew took art classes at Christchurch in Hampshire before studying at the Grosvenor School of Modern Art in London, where her younger sister Diana Drew also studied. In 1928, Pamela went to Paris to study under Roger Chastel. She exhibited in 1936 with the Royal Institute of Oil Painters. The same year she designed a poster for Shell as part of their Visit Britain campaign. The following year Drew married the fourth Baron Rathdonnell and took up residence at Lisnavagh House at Rathvilly in County Carlow.

During the Second World War, Drew served in the Women's Royal Naval Service, being stationed in Rosyth, Plymouth and then Belfast towards the end of the conflict. After the War, Drew participated in the founding exhibition of the Society of Marine Artists, later the Royal Society of Marine Artists, RSMA. The Fitting-out Basin, Harland & Wolff, Drew's RSMA diploma artwork is now held by the National Maritime Museum. The Ulster Museum holds another of Drews' paintings from the Harland & Wolff shipyard. In 1953 she was commissioned by the Royal Air Force, RAF, to depict the Coronation Review. In 1954 she returned to Belfast to record the launching of the Southern Cross and became a member of newly formed Society of Aviation Artists. The Air Ministry commissioned Drew as a war artist to record the activities of the Middle East Air Force at Port Said and at Suez in 1955 and 1956. She also depicted RAF actions against the Mau Mau and in Cyprus. Both the Imperial War Museum and the Royal Air Force Museum in London, and the Ministry of Defence Art Collection hold examples of these paintings. In 1956 Drew had a solo exhibition of her paintings in London followed by two further solo shows in Nairobi in 1957 and 1958.

Baron Rathdonnell died in 1959 and Drew remarried in 1961, to a Major Hugh Caruthers Massy. Drew continued to paint marine and aviation subjects. Her painting of Sir Francis Chichester arriving in London to complete his round the world voyage on Gipsy Moth IV is held by the Port of London Authority. Although she kept a London address from 1970 to 1980, Drew lived at Ballinatray in County Cork. While living in Ballinatray, Drew held an exhibition of her drawings from East Africa in 1975 at the Cork Arts Society's Galleries. The same venue displayed an exhibition of Drew's aviation paintings in 1978. Further exhibitions of her work were held at Málaga in Spain in 1982 and at the Abbot Hall Art Gallery in Kendal the following year.
