= Killavullen Caves =

Caves in Ireland

Coordinates: 52.1486°N 8.5158°W

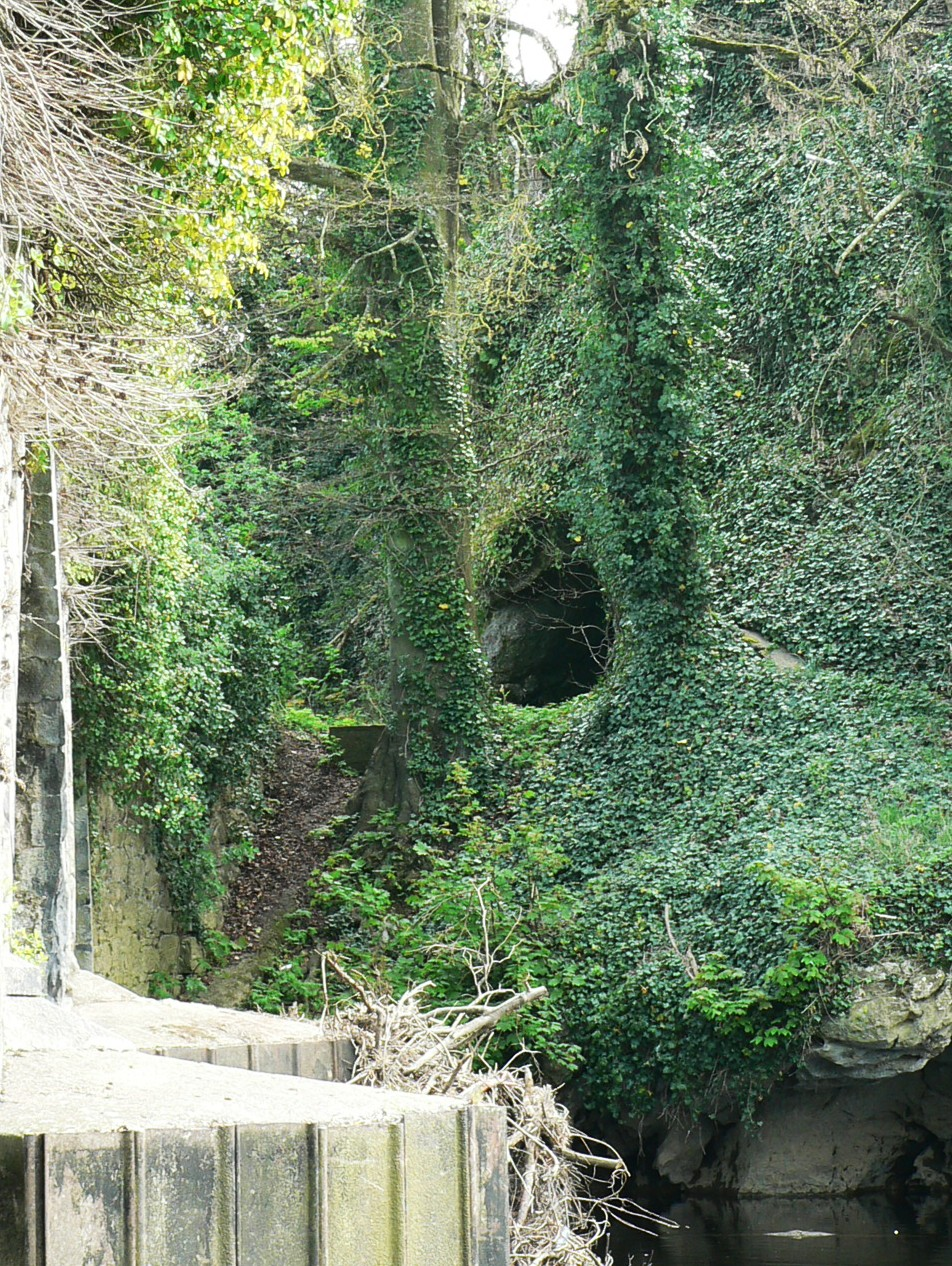
- One of the cave entrances, overhanging the River Blackwater
- Interactive map of Killavullen Caves
- Location: Killavullen, County Cork
- Entrances: 3+

The Killavullen Caves are limestone caves near the village of Killavullen in County Cork, Ireland. They are situated on the south bank of the River Blackwater at Killavullen Bridge.

The caves have been known to local people for hundreds of years, and have been inhabited at various times during their history. Some of them were inhabited when Irish antiquary Thomas Crofton Croker visited in the early 19th century:

"...the road winds round a mass of steep limestone rock, in which are natural caverns, used as habitations by the peasantry. One of these was the dwelling of the village smith, the light from whose forge threw a broad and vivid reflection across the road, that lay in the solemnity of deep shadow."

The caves are particularly notable for the large number of archaeological and palaeontological remains discovered within. Excavations in one of the caves in 1934 revealed the remains of Irish Elk, brown bear, wolf and reindeer and further excavations produced a human skull.

The caves were closed to the public in the early 1990s, with steel doors put in place to prevent access. Public liability reasons were cited at the time of closure.
