= Orrery and Kilmore =

Barony in County Cork, Ireland

Orrery and Kilmore Orbhraí agus An Choill Mhór (Irish)
- Barony
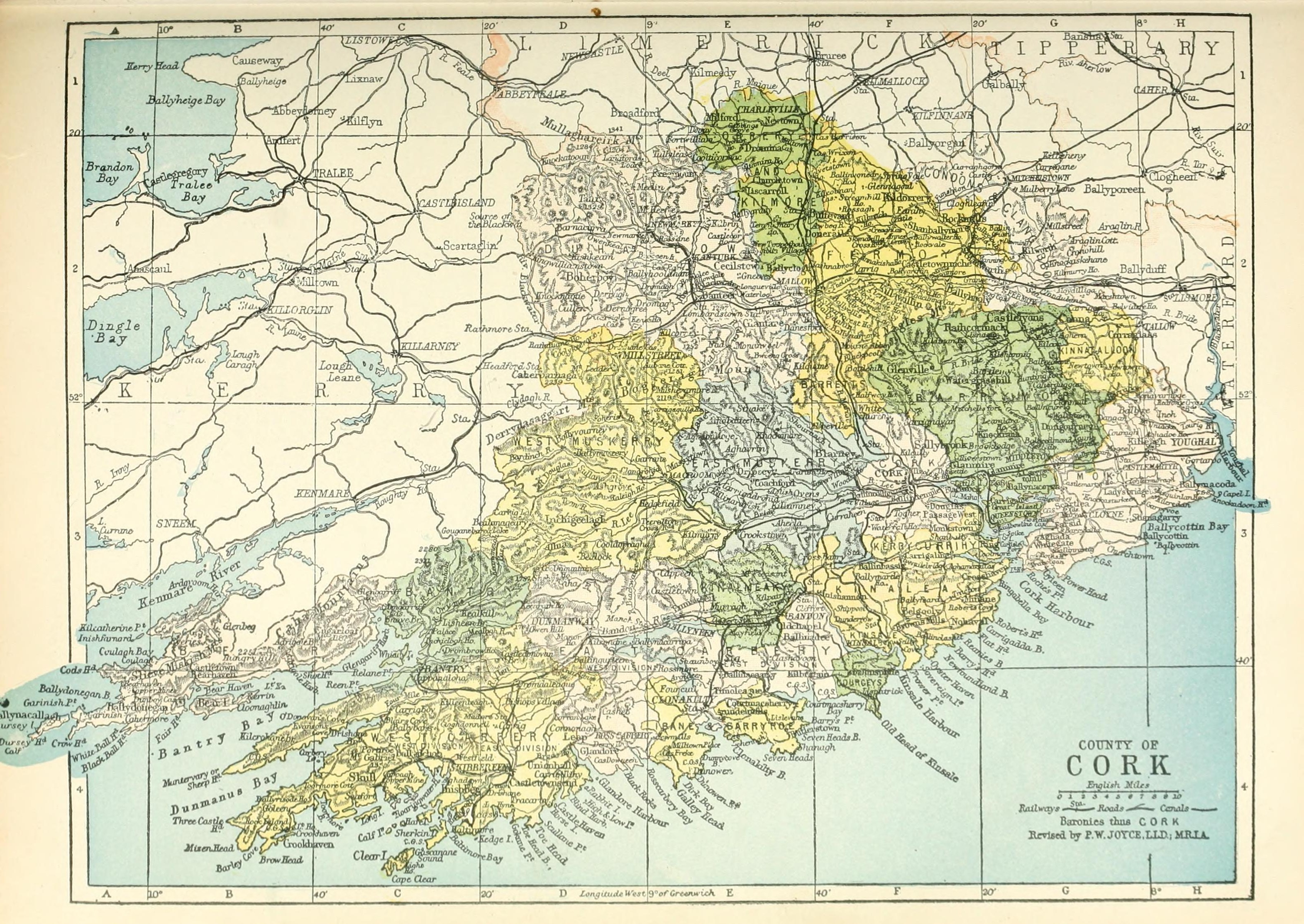
- Barony map of County Cork, 1900; Orrery and Kilmore barony is in the north, coloured green.

- Location within County Cork
- Coordinates: 52°16′N 8°45′W
- Sovereign state: Ireland
- Province: Munster
- County: Cork

Area
  - Total: 280.6 km^{2} (108.3 sq mi)

Orrery and Kilmore (Irish: Orbhraí agus An Choill Mhór) is a historical barony in north County Cork, Ireland.

Baronies were mainly cadastral rather than administrative units. They acquired modest local taxation and spending functions in the 19th century before being superseded by the Local Government (Ireland) Act 1898.

== History and legend ==
"Orrery" is derived from the Orbraige (pronounced like "Orvery"), "descendants of Orbh;" one of the tribute kingdoms of Munster; according to Lebor na Cert their annual tax paid to Cashel was fifty cows, fifty oxen and fifty cattle carcasses; another place gives their obligation as a hundred cows, a hundred white cloths and a hundred sows. One of these must refer to the Orbraige of Druim Imnocht, a subbranch of the tribe that was based in County Kerry. Their ancestor Orb(h) was supposedly descended from Fereidhech, a son of Fergus mac Róich.

After the Plantation of Munster, the ancient kingdom's name was preserved with the granting of the title of Earl of Orrery to Roger Boyle, Baron of Broghill in 1660. Charles Boyle, 4th Earl of Orrery gave his name to the scientific instrument, the orrery, the first example of which was built in 1715 by John Rowley in London (the Earl was his patron).

"Kilmore" (Coill Mór) means "Great Wood," referring to the forests found northwest of Newtownshandrum.

== Geography ==
Orrery and Kilmore is in the north of the county, sandwiched between Fermoy barony and Duhallow, to the south of the River Maigue. Kilmore is the northern part, Orrery in the south.

== List of settlements ==
Settlements within the historical barony of Orrery and Kilmore include:

- Ballyclogh
- Buttevant
- Charleville
- Churchtown
- Dromina
- Liscarroll
- Milford
- Newtownshandrum

== See also ==
- List of townlands of the barony of Orrery and Kilmore
