= List of townlands of the barony of Condons & Clangibbon =

This is a sortable table of the townlands in the barony of Condons & Clangibbon, County Cork, Ireland. Duplicate names occur where there is more than one townland with the same name in the barony, and also where a townland is known by two alternative names. Names marked in bold typeface are towns and villages, and the word Town appears for those entries in the area column.

== Townland list ==
Townland	Area (acres)	Barony	Civil parish	Poor law union
Aghacross	355	Condons & Clangibbon	Aghacross	Mitchelstown
Ardglare	239	Condons & Clangibbon	Brigown	Mitchelstown
Ballard	442	Condons & Clangibbon	Macroney	Fermoy
Ballinglanna North	364	Condons & Clangibbon	Kilcrumper	Fermoy
Ballinrush	370	Condons & Clangibbon	Kilcrumper	Fermoy
Ballinrush	604	Condons & Clangibbon	Kilworth	Fermoy
Ballinveelig	147	Condons & Clangibbon	Clondulane	Fermoy
Ballinvoher	1,261	Condons & Clangibbon	Kilworth	Fermoy
Ballinwillin	138	Condons & Clangibbon	Brigown	Mitchelstown
Ballyadack North	196	Condons & Clangibbon	Kilphelan	Mitchelstown
Ballyadack South	113	Condons & Clangibbon	Kilphelan	Mitchelstown
Ballyarthur	126	Condons & Clangibbon	Fermoy	Fermoy
Ballyarthur	852	Condons & Clangibbon	Marshalstown	Mitchelstown
Ballybeg	248	Condons & Clangibbon	Brigown	Mitchelstown
Ballybeg	92	Condons & Clangibbon	Glanworth	Mitchelstown
Ballyderown	460	Condons & Clangibbon	Kilcrumper	Fermoy
Ballydorgan	499	Condons & Clangibbon	Castlelyons	Fermoy
Ballyenahan North	693	Condons & Clangibbon	Derryvillane	Mitchelstown
Ballygiblin	192	Condons & Clangibbon	Brigown	Mitchelstown
Ballykearney	225	Condons & Clangibbon	Kilgullane	Mitchelstown
Ballykenly	141	Condons & Clangibbon	Glanworth	Mitchelstown
Ballynabrock	347	Condons & Clangibbon	Brigown	Mitchelstown
Ballynacaheragh	248	Condons & Clangibbon	Glanworth	Mitchelstown
Ballynacarriga	238	Condons & Clangibbon	Kilcrumper	Fermoy
**Ballynafauna**	Town	Condons & Clangibbon	Clondulane	Fermoy
Ballynafauna	256	Condons & Clangibbon	Clondulane	Fermoy
Ballynahow (Murrogh)	122	Condons & Clangibbon	Glanworth	Fermoy
Ballynahow (Spiers)	174	Condons & Clangibbon	Glanworth	Fermoy
Ballynalacken	529	Condons & Clangibbon	Leitrim	Fermoy
Ballynamona	126	Condons & Clangibbon	Clondulane	Fermoy
Ballynamona	370	Condons & Clangibbon	Brigown	Mitchelstown
Ballynamuddagh	933	Condons & Clangibbon	Leitrim	Fermoy
Ballynaparka North	172	Condons & Clangibbon	Leitrim	Fermoy
Ballynaparka South	123	Condons & Clangibbon	Leitrim	Fermoy
Ballynoe	148	Condons & Clangibbon	Fermoy	Fermoy
Ballynoe East	92	Condons & Clangibbon	Glanworth	Fermoy
Ballyshurdane	381	Condons & Clangibbon	Templemolaga	Mitchelstown
Ballyvadona	400	Condons & Clangibbon	Clondulane	Fermoy
Ballyvisteen	388	Condons & Clangibbon	Kildorrery	Mitchelstown
Ballyvolock	148	Condons & Clangibbon	Glanworth	Fermoy
Baunnanooneeny	250	Condons & Clangibbon	Marshalstown	Mitchelstown
Bawnanearla	58	Condons & Clangibbon	Kilphelan	Mitchelstown
Bawnnaglogh	81	Condons & Clangibbon	Clondulane	Fermoy
Bettyville	182	Condons & Clangibbon	Clondulane	Fermoy
Billeragh East	905	Condons & Clangibbon	Macroney	Fermoy
Billeragh West	810	Condons & Clangibbon	Macroney	Fermoy
Boleynanoultagh	589	Condons & Clangibbon	Kildorrery	Mitchelstown
Boolabwee	119	Condons & Clangibbon	Clondulane	Fermoy
Booladurragha	98	Condons & Clangibbon	Marshalstown	Mitchelstown
Boolakelly	144	Condons & Clangibbon	Marshalstown	Mitchelstown
Brigown	688	Condons & Clangibbon	Brigown	Mitchelstown
Broomhill	289	Condons & Clangibbon	Kilgullane	Mitchelstown
Caherdrinny	22	Condons & Clangibbon	Kilphelan	Mitchelstown
Caherdrinny	826	Condons & Clangibbon	Glanworth	Mitchelstown
Careysville	291	Condons & Clangibbon	Clondulane	Fermoy
Carrigabrick	221	Condons & Clangibbon	Clondulane	Fermoy
Carrigane	799	Condons & Clangibbon	Brigown	Mitchelstown
Carriganleigh	69	Condons & Clangibbon	Kilgullane	Mitchelstown
Carrigatoorante	170	Condons & Clangibbon	Clondulane	Fermoy
Carrignagroghera	335	Condons & Clangibbon	Fermoy	Fermoy
Castlecooke	597	Condons & Clangibbon	Macroney	Fermoy
Castlehyde	213	Condons & Clangibbon	Fermoy	Fermoy
Castlehyde East	340	Condons & Clangibbon	Litter	Fermoy
Cloghleafin	161	Condons & Clangibbon	Marshalstown	Mitchelstown
Cloghleafin	520	Condons & Clangibbon	Kilgullane	Mitchelstown
**Clonderalaw**	Town	Condons & Clangibbon	Clondulane	Fermoy
Clondulane North	178	Condons & Clangibbon	Clondulane	Fermoy
Clondulane South	129	Condons & Clangibbon	Clondulane	Fermoy
Cloonkilla	198	Condons & Clangibbon	Kilgullane	Mitchelstown
Cloonlough	327	Condons & Clangibbon	Brigown	Mitchelstown
Clyroe	63	Condons & Clangibbon	Marshalstown	Mitchelstown
Commons	11	Condons & Clangibbon	Kilgullane	Mitchelstown
Coolalisheen	269	Condons & Clangibbon	Leitrim	Fermoy
Coolaneague	303	Condons & Clangibbon	Macroney	Fermoy
Coolbaun	68	Condons & Clangibbon	Knockmourne	Fermoy
Coolcarron	353	Condons & Clangibbon	Fermoy	Fermoy
Coolmoohan	406	Condons & Clangibbon	Macroney	Fermoy
Coolmucky	278	Condons & Clangibbon	Litter	Fermoy
Coolmucky	303	Condons & Clangibbon	Fermoy	Fermoy
Coolnanave	403	Condons & Clangibbon	Brigown	Mitchelstown
Coolroe	389	Condons & Clangibbon	Litter	Fermoy
Coolyregan	579	Condons & Clangibbon	Brigown	Mitchelstown
Cornhill	343	Condons & Clangibbon	Glanworth	Fermoy
Corracunna	374	Condons & Clangibbon	Brigown	Mitchelstown
Crinnaghtane	236	Condons & Clangibbon	Macroney	Fermoy
Cronohill	725	Condons & Clangibbon	Leitrim	Fermoy
Cullenagh	316	Condons & Clangibbon	Fermoy	Fermoy
Cullenagh	56	Condons & Clangibbon	Kildorrery	Mitchelstown
Cullenagh	860	Condons & Clangibbon	Templemolaga	Mitchelstown
Currabeha	434	Condons & Clangibbon	Castlelyons	Fermoy
Curragh Lower	120	Condons & Clangibbon	Clondulane	Fermoy
Curragh More	523	Condons & Clangibbon	Brigown	Mitchelstown
Curragh Upper	312	Condons & Clangibbon	Clondulane	Fermoy
Curraghanolomer	367	Condons & Clangibbon	Macroney	Fermoy
Curraghavoe	941	Condons & Clangibbon	Brigown	Mitchelstown
Curraghbowen	138	Condons & Clangibbon	Kilgullane	Mitchelstown
Curraghgorm	721	Condons & Clangibbon	Marshalstown	Mitchelstown
Curraheen	199	Condons & Clangibbon	Kilgullane	Mitchelstown
Deer Park	242	Condons & Clangibbon	Litter	Fermoy
Derrylahan	333	Condons & Clangibbon	Marshalstown	Mitchelstown
Derrynanool	458	Condons & Clangibbon	Marshalstown	Mitchelstown
Dromleigh	318	Condons & Clangibbon	Kilgullane	Mitchelstown
Drough	239	Condons & Clangibbon	Marshalstown	Mitchelstown
Duntahane	459	Condons & Clangibbon	Fermoy	Fermoy
Farramlahassery East	37	Condons & Clangibbon	Dunmahon	Fermoy
**Fermoy**	Town	Condons & Clangibbon	Fermoy	Fermoy
Fermoy	709	Condons & Clangibbon	Fermoy	Fermoy
Flemingstown	535	Condons & Clangibbon	Kilgullane	Mitchelstown
Flemingstown	9	Condons & Clangibbon	Kilphelan	Mitchelstown
Furrow	425	Condons & Clangibbon	Brigown	Mitchelstown
Garrane	487	Condons & Clangibbon	Brigown	Mitchelstown
Garraunigerinagh	677	Condons & Clangibbon	Litter	Fermoy
Garryleagh	185	Condons & Clangibbon	Brigown	Mitchelstown
Garrynagoul	266	Condons & Clangibbon	Lismore & Mocollop	Fermoy
Garrynoe	169	Condons & Clangibbon	Clondulane	Fermoy
Glansheskin	217	Condons & Clangibbon	Kilworth	Fermoy
Glasvaunta	91	Condons & Clangibbon	Kildorrery	Mitchelstown
Glenagurteen	156	Condons & Clangibbon	Lismore & Mocollop	Fermoy
Glenatlucky	454	Condons & Clangibbon	Brigown	Mitchelstown
Glenduff	1,132	Condons & Clangibbon	Brigown	Mitchelstown
Glennahulla	250	Condons & Clangibbon	Marshalstown	Mitchelstown
Gortacurrig	321	Condons & Clangibbon	Kildorrery	Mitchelstown
Gorteenatarriff	417	Condons & Clangibbon	Marshalstown	Mitchelstown
Gortnahown	574	Condons & Clangibbon	Glanworth	Mitchelstown
Gortnaminna	189	Condons & Clangibbon	Marshalstown	Mitchelstown
Gortnaskehy	935	Condons & Clangibbon	Macroney	Fermoy
Gortnasna	117	Condons & Clangibbon	Marshalstown	Mitchelstown
Gortroe	482	Condons & Clangibbon	Marshalstown	Mitchelstown
Graigue	561	Condons & Clangibbon	Templemolaga	Mitchelstown
Graigue	727	Condons & Clangibbon	Kilworth	Fermoy
Grange East	243	Condons & Clangibbon	Fermoy	Fermoy
Grange West	270	Condons & Clangibbon	Fermoy	Fermoy
Gurteenaboul	223	Condons & Clangibbon	Brigown	Mitchelstown
Johnstown	192	Condons & Clangibbon	Kilgullane	Mitchelstown
Kilbarry	877	Condons & Clangibbon	Castlelyons	Fermoy
Kilclogh	517	Condons & Clangibbon	Macroney	Fermoy
Kilclooney	777	Condons & Clangibbon	Templemolaga	Mitchelstown
Kilcoran North	83	Condons & Clangibbon	Knockmourne	Fermoy
Kilcoran South	474	Condons & Clangibbon	Knockmourne	Fermoy
**Kildorrery**	Town	Condons & Clangibbon	Kildorrery	Mitchelstown
Kildorrery	111	Condons & Clangibbon	Kildorrery	Mitchelstown
Kildrum	411	Condons & Clangibbon	Brigown	Mitchelstown
Kilgullane	256	Condons & Clangibbon	Kilgullane	Mitchelstown
Killaclug East	189	Condons & Clangibbon	Marshalstown	Mitchelstown
Killaclug West	202	Condons & Clangibbon	Marshalstown	Mitchelstown
Killakane	821	Condons & Clangibbon	Brigown	Mitchelstown
Killally East	283	Condons & Clangibbon	Kilworth	Fermoy
Killally West	185	Condons & Clangibbon	Kilworth	Fermoy
Killee	631	Condons & Clangibbon	Marshalstown	Mitchelstown
Kilmagner	765	Condons & Clangibbon	Castlelyons	Fermoy
Kilmurry North	567	Condons & Clangibbon	Leitrim	Fermoy
Kilmurry South	521	Condons & Clangibbon	Leitrim	Fermoy
Kilnadrow	183	Condons & Clangibbon	Kilgullane	Mitchelstown
Kilphelan	122	Condons & Clangibbon	Kilphelan	Mitchelstown
Kilshanny	377	Condons & Clangibbon	Brigown	Mitchelstown
Kiltrislane	267	Condons & Clangibbon	Brigown	Mitchelstown
**Kilworth**	Town	Condons & Clangibbon	Kilworth	Fermoy
Kilworth	175	Condons & Clangibbon	Kilworth	Fermoy
Knockacappul	100	Condons & Clangibbon	Litter	Fermoy
Knockagarry	611	Condons & Clangibbon	Marshalstown	Mitchelstown
Knockanenabohilly	168	Condons & Clangibbon	Kilcrumper	Fermoy
Knockanevin	536	Condons & Clangibbon	Templemolaga	Mitchelstown
Knockanohill	113	Condons & Clangibbon	Kilworth	Fermoy
Knockaskehane	226	Condons & Clangibbon	Leitrim	Fermoy
Knockatrasnane	518	Condons & Clangibbon	Leitrim	Fermoy
Knockdromaclogh	282	Condons & Clangibbon	Clondulane	Fermoy
Knockdromaclogh	360	Condons & Clangibbon	Castlelyons	Fermoy
Knocknamuck	259	Condons & Clangibbon	Brigown	Mitchelstown
Kylebeg	144	Condons & Clangibbon	Leitrim	Fermoy
Labbacallee	392	Condons & Clangibbon	Litter	Fermoy
Labbamolaga East	409	Condons & Clangibbon	Templemolaga	Mitchelstown
Labbamolaga Middle	443	Condons & Clangibbon	Templemolaga	Mitchelstown
Labbamolaga West	343	Condons & Clangibbon	Templemolaga	Mitchelstown
Leitrim	376	Condons & Clangibbon	Leitrim	Fermoy
Licklash	191	Condons & Clangibbon	Clondulane	Fermoy
Lisnasallagh	129	Condons & Clangibbon	Clondulane	Fermoy
Lyre (Barry)	648	Condons & Clangibbon	Macroney	Fermoy
Lyre	576	Condons & Clangibbon	Macroney	Fermoy
Lyreen	304	Condons & Clangibbon	Macroney	Fermoy
Macroney Lower	578	Condons & Clangibbon	Macroney	Fermoy
Macroney Upper	738	Condons & Clangibbon	Macroney	Fermoy
Manning	393	Condons & Clangibbon	Glanworth	Fermoy
Marshalstown	480	Condons & Clangibbon	Marshalstown	Mitchelstown
Marshtown	331	Condons & Clangibbon	Lismore & Mocollop	Fermoy
Maryville	89	Condons & Clangibbon	Kilworth	Fermoy
**Mitchelstown**	Town	Condons & Clangibbon	Brigown	Mitchelstown
Mitchelstown	393	Condons & Clangibbon	Marshalstown	Mitchelstown
Mitchelstown	840	Condons & Clangibbon	Brigown	Mitchelstown
Monadrishane	214	Condons & Clangibbon	Kilworth	Fermoy
Moorepark	223	Condons & Clangibbon	Kilcrumper	Fermoy
Moorepark	233	Condons & Clangibbon	Kilworth	Fermoy
Mount Rivers	155	Condons & Clangibbon	Clondulane	Fermoy
Moydilliga	1,200	Condons & Clangibbon	Knockmourne	Fermoy
Newgrove	320	Condons & Clangibbon	Glanworth	Mitchelstown
Nutgrove	229	Condons & Clangibbon	Kilgullane	Mitchelstown
Oldcastletown	864	Condons & Clangibbon	Kildorrery	Mitchelstown
Parknakilla	151	Condons & Clangibbon	Brigown	Mitchelstown
Pollardstown	488	Condons & Clangibbon	Brigown	Mitchelstown
Propoge	802	Condons & Clangibbon	Leitrim	Fermoy
Quitrent Mountain	1,195	Condons & Clangibbon	Farahy	Mitchelstown
Rath-healy	222	Condons & Clangibbon	Clondulane	Fermoy
Rossnabrone	60	Condons & Clangibbon	Castlelyons	Fermoy
Scart	511	Condons & Clangibbon	Kildorrery	Mitchelstown
Shanacloon	304	Condons & Clangibbon	Clondulane	Fermoy
Shean	75	Condons & Clangibbon	Lismore & Mocollop	Fermoy
Sheepwalk East	311	Condons & Clangibbon	Litter	Fermoy
Skeheen (Upper)	1,207	Condons & Clangibbon	Brigown	Mitchelstown
Skeheen	478	Condons & Clangibbon	Brigown	Mitchelstown
Sraharla	381	Condons & Clangibbon	Templemolaga	Mitchelstown
Stag Park	306	Condons & Clangibbon	Brigown	Mitchelstown
Strawhall	573	Condons & Clangibbon	Clondulane	Fermoy
Toor	716	Condons & Clangibbon	Kilworth	Fermoy
Toorreagh	251	Condons & Clangibbon	Templemolaga	Mitchelstown
Turbeagh	519	Condons & Clangibbon	Brigown	Mitchelstown
Waterpark	463	Condons & Clangibbon	Lismore & Mocollop	Fermoy
Whitebog	633	Condons & Clangibbon	Kilworth	Fermoy
