= River Funshion =

River in Munster, Ireland, tributary of the Munster Blackwater

Coordinates: 52.363517°N 8.163148°W

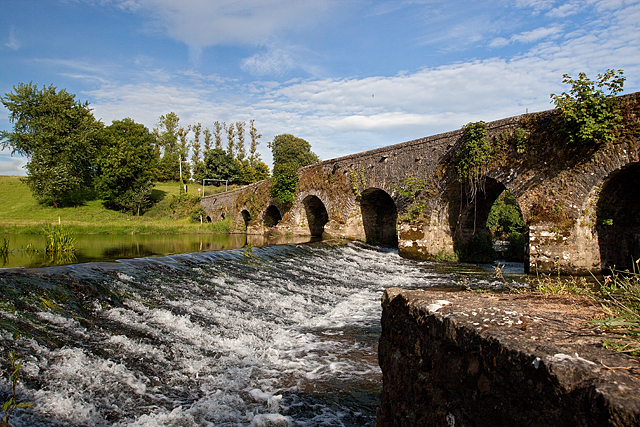
- Glanworth Bridge
- Etymology: Irish for "ash river"
- Native name: Abhainn na Fuinseann (Irish)

Location
- Country: Ireland
- Cities: Kilbeheny, Mitchelstown, Kildorrery, Rockmills, Glanworth

Physical characteristics
- Source
  - location: Galtee Mountains
- Mouth: Munster Blackwater
  - location: Fermoy, County Cork
- Length: 55.92 km (34.75 mi)
- Basin size: 334 km^{2} (129 sq mi)
- Discharge
  - average: 10.045 m^{3}/s (354.7 cu ft/s)

Basin features
- River system: Munster Blackwater

The River Funshion (/ˈfʊnʃən/; Irish: Abhainn na Fuinseann) is a river in Munster, Ireland, a tributary of the Munster Blackwater.

== Course ==
The River Funshion rises in the Galtee Mountains at Kilbeheny, near the County Limerick–County Tipperary border. It flows southwards past Galtee Castle and under the M8, crossing the R639. It then flows westwards and forms part of the County Limerick–County Cork border, passing under the M8 again, and the R639 at Kilbeheny. It flows westwards through Mitchelstown Golf Club, north of the town. The Funshion passes under the N73 near Kildorrery, flowing southeast through Glanworth and again under the M8 and R639, draining into the Munster Blackwater about 3.5 km (2 mi) downriver of Fermoy.

== Wildlife ==
The River Funshion is a brown trout and salmon fishery.

== See also ==
- Rivers of Ireland
