= List of townlands of the barony of Orrery and Kilmore =

This is a sortable table of the townlands in the barony of Orrery and Kilmore, County Cork, Ireland. Duplicate names occur where there is more than one townland with the same name in the barony, and also where a townland is known by two alternative names. Names marked in bold typeface are towns and villages, and the word Town appears for those entries in the area column.

== Townland list ==
Townland	Area (acres)	Barony	Civil parish	Poor law union
Acres	53	Orrery and Kilmore	Kilbolane	Kanturk
Altamira	216	Orrery and Kilmore	Liscarroll	Mallow
Annagh Bogs	254	Orrery and Kilmore	Churchtown	Mallow
Annagh North	534	Orrery and Kilmore	Churchtown	Mallow
Annagh South	190	Orrery and Kilmore	Churchtown	Mallow
Ardagh	169	Orrery and Kilmore	Shandrum	Kanturk
Ardaprior	794	Orrery and Kilmore	Buttevant	Mallow
Ardglass	42	Orrery and Kilmore	Aglishdrinagh	Kilmallock
Ardglass	498	Orrery and Kilmore	Shandrum	Kilmallock
Ardmore	182	Orrery and Kilmore	Rathgoggan	Kilmallock
Ardnageehy	361	Orrery and Kilmore	Rathgoggan	Kilmallock
Ardskeagh	382	Orrery and Kilmore	Buttevant	Mallow
Aughrim	561	Orrery and Kilmore	Shandrum	Kanturk
Ballagharea	314	Orrery and Kilmore	Kilbolane	Kanturk
Ballina	634	Orrery and Kilmore	Kilbolane	Kanturk
Ballinaltig	205	Orrery and Kilmore	Ballyclogh	Kanturk
Ballincurrig	327	Orrery and Kilmore	Kilbroney	Mallow
Ballindillanig	326	Orrery and Kilmore	Churchtown	Mallow
Ballinguile	361	Orrery and Kilmore	Kilbroney	Mallow
Ballyadam	104	Orrery and Kilmore	Churchtown	Mallow
Ballybeg	746	Orrery and Kilmore	Buttevant	Mallow
Ballybeg East	417	Orrery and Kilmore	Buttevant	Mallow
Ballybeg Middle	493	Orrery and Kilmore	Buttevant	Mallow
Ballybeg West	438	Orrery and Kilmore	Buttevant	Mallow
**Ballyclogh**	Town	Orrery and Kilmore	Ballyclogh	Mallow
Ballyclogh	302	Orrery and Kilmore	Ballyclogh	Mallow
Ballycoskery	819	Orrery and Kilmore	Aglishdrinagh	Kilmallock
Ballycushen	190	Orrery and Kilmore	Ballyclogh	Mallow
Ballydaheen	215	Orrery and Kilmore	Shandrum	Kilmallock
Ballygrace	322	Orrery and Kilmore	Churchtown	Mallow
Ballyhane Lower	259	Orrery and Kilmore	Kilbolane	Kanturk
Ballyhane Upper	167	Orrery and Kilmore	Kilbolane	Kanturk
Ballyhubbo	114	Orrery and Kilmore	Rathgoggan	Kilmallock
Ballykitt	219	Orrery and Kilmore	Ballyclogh	Mallow
Ballynaboul	362	Orrery and Kilmore	Churchtown	Mallow
Ballynadrideen	642	Orrery and Kilmore	Aglishdrinagh	Kilmallock
Ballynakilla East	889	Orrery and Kilmore	Shandrum	Kanturk
Ballynakilla West	626	Orrery and Kilmore	Shandrum	Kanturk
Ballynamuck	75	Orrery and Kilmore	Churchtown	Mallow
Ballynatrilla	237	Orrery and Kilmore	Kilbroney	Mallow
Ballynoran	275	Orrery and Kilmore	Aglishdrinagh	Kilmallock
Ballypierce	159	Orrery and Kilmore	Rathgoggan	Kilmallock
Ballyroe	392	Orrery and Kilmore	Aglishdrinagh	Kilmallock
Ballysallagh	280	Orrery and Kilmore	Rathgoggan	Kilmallock
Ballysallagh	63	Orrery and Kilmore	Hackmys	Kilmallock
Ballyvaheen	153	Orrery and Kilmore	Churchtown	Mallow
Ballyvorisheen	151	Orrery and Kilmore	Kilbroney	Mallow
Blossomfort	508	Orrery and Kilmore	Ballyclogh	Mallow
Boherascrub East	282	Orrery and Kilmore	Buttevant	Mallow
Boherascrub West	527	Orrery and Kilmore	Buttevant	Mallow
Boolard	200	Orrery and Kilmore	Shandrum	Kilmallock
Bregoge	701	Orrery and Kilmore	Bregoge	Mallow
Broghill North	579	Orrery and Kilmore	Ballyhay	Kilmallock
Broghill South	195	Orrery and Kilmore	Ballyhay	Kilmallock
Buavanagh	153	Orrery and Kilmore	Bregoge	Mallow
Burton Park	156	Orrery and Kilmore	Churchtown	Mallow
**Buttevant**	Town	Orrery and Kilmore	Buttevant	Mallow
Buttevant	51	Orrery and Kilmore	Buttevant	Mallow
Carrigeen	328	Orrery and Kilmore	Churchtown	Mallow
Castleharrison	239	Orrery and Kilmore	Ballyhay	Kilmallock
Castle-land	67	Orrery and Kilmore	Buttevant	Mallow
Castlelishen	282	Orrery and Kilmore	Kilbolane	Kanturk
Castlewrixon	99	Orrery and Kilmore	Imphrick	Kilmallock
Castlewrixon South	867	Orrery and Kilmore	Imphrick	Kilmallock
**Charleville**	Town	Orrery and Kilmore	Rathgoggan	Kilmallock
**Churchtown**	Town	Orrery and Kilmore	Churchtown	Mallow
Churchtown	164	Orrery and Kilmore	Churchtown	Mallow
Clashelane	175	Orrery and Kilmore	Churchtown	Mallow
Clashganniv	107	Orrery and Kilmore	Rathgoggan	Kilmallock
Clashganniv	276	Orrery and Kilmore	Churchtown	Mallow
Clashnabuttry	38	Orrery and Kilmore	Buttevant	Mallow
Cloghanughera	366	Orrery and Kilmore	Shandrum	Kilmallock
Cloonee	153	Orrery and Kilmore	Kilbolane	Kanturk
Cloonkeen	406	Orrery and Kilmore	Aglishdrinagh	Kilmallock
Cloonleagh North	305	Orrery and Kilmore	Shandrum	Kanturk
Cloonleagh South	266	Orrery and Kilmore	Shandrum	Kanturk
Cloonmore	429	Orrery and Kilmore	Shandrum	Kanturk
Cloonsillagh	405	Orrery and Kilmore	Tullylease	Kanturk
Clyderragh	292	Orrery and Kilmore	Shandrum	Kilmallock
Coarliss	71	Orrery and Kilmore	Ballyhay	Kilmallock
Concealment	87	Orrery and Kilmore	Kilbolane	Kanturk
Coolasmuttane	705	Orrery and Kilmore	Shandrum	Kanturk
Coolbane	286	Orrery and Kilmore	Liscarroll	Mallow
Coolcaum	406	Orrery and Kilmore	Aglishdrinagh	Kilmallock
Cooles	601	Orrery and Kilmore	Tullylease	Kanturk
Cooliney	451	Orrery and Kilmore	Cooliney	Kilmallock
Coolmore	175	Orrery and Kilmore	Churchtown	Mallow
Coolnagour	229	Orrery and Kilmore	Kilbolane	Kanturk
Copsetown	348	Orrery and Kilmore	Buttevant	Mallow
Cregganacourty	255	Orrery and Kilmore	Churchtown	Mallow
Creggane	278	Orrery and Kilmore	Buttevant	Mallow
Cromagloun	76	Orrery and Kilmore	Tullylease	Kanturk
Cromore	559	Orrery and Kilmore	Kilbolane	Kanturk
Croughta	614	Orrery and Kilmore	Ballyclogh	Mallow
Cullig	277	Orrery and Kilmore	Churchtown	Mallow
Curra	187	Orrery and Kilmore	Kilbolane	Kanturk
Curraghalehane	132	Orrery and Kilmore	Ballyclogh	Mallow
Curraghcloonabro East	452	Orrery and Kilmore	Shandrum	Kanturk
Curraghcloonabro West	464	Orrery and Kilmore	Shandrum	Kanturk
Curraglass	320	Orrery and Kilmore	Buttevant	Mallow
Curryglass	488	Orrery and Kilmore	Shandrum	Kanturk
Currymount	259	Orrery and Kilmore	Bregoge	Mallow
Delliga	182	Orrery and Kilmore	Kilbolane	Kanturk
Derryorgan	286	Orrery and Kilmore	Ballyclogh	Mallow
Doony	302	Orrery and Kilmore	Kilbolane	Kanturk
Dreenagh East	230	Orrery and Kilmore	Buttevant	Mallow
Dreenagh West	196	Orrery and Kilmore	Buttevant	Mallow
Dromdowney	56	Orrery and Kilmore	Dromdowney	Mallow
Dromdowney Lower	183	Orrery and Kilmore	Dromdowney	Mallow
Dromdowney Upper	419	Orrery and Kilmore	Dromdowney	Mallow
**Dromina**	Town	Orrery and Kilmore	Shandrum	Kanturk
Dromina	721	Orrery and Kilmore	Shandrum	Kanturk
Dunbarry	108	Orrery and Kilmore	Churchtown	Mallow
Dunbarry	40	Orrery and Kilmore	Bregoge	Mallow
Earlsfields	47	Orrery and Kilmore	Shandrum	Kanturk
Egmont	612	Orrery and Kilmore	Churchtown	Mallow
Farhtingville East	482	Orrery and Kilmore	Shandrum	Kanturk
Farhtingville West	430	Orrery and Kilmore	Shandrum	Kanturk
Farran	102	Orrery and Kilmore	Ballyhay	Kilmallock
Farrancotter	165	Orrery and Kilmore	Buttevant	Mallow
Farranshonikeen	84	Orrery and Kilmore	Rathgoggan	Kilmallock
Ferryfort	170	Orrery and Kilmore	Shandrum	Kanturk
Fiddane	244	Orrery and Kilmore	Aglishdrinagh	Kilmallock
Fortlands	121	Orrery and Kilmore	Rathgoggan	Kilmallock
Garranenageevoge	227	Orrery and Kilmore	Buttevant	Mallow
Garryduff	390	Orrery and Kilmore	Ballyclogh	Mallow
Garrynagranoge	355	Orrery and Kilmore	Rathgoggan	Kilmallock
Glengarriff	279	Orrery and Kilmore	Shandrum	Kilmallock
Gortaheeda	28	Orrery and Kilmore	Kilbolane	Kanturk
Gortnagoul	338	Orrery and Kilmore	Kilbolane	Kanturk
Gortskagh	185	Orrery and Kilmore	Shandrum	Kilmallock
Grange East	513	Orrery and Kilmore	Buttevant	Mallow
Grange West	425	Orrery and Kilmore	Buttevant	Mallow
Gurteenroe	433	Orrery and Kilmore	Churchtown	Mallow
Gurteenroe Commons	51	Orrery and Kilmore	Churchtown	Mallow
Imogane	278	Orrery and Kilmore	Churchtown	Mallow
Jordanstown	142	Orrery and Kilmore	Kilbroney	Mallow
Kilbolane	420	Orrery and Kilmore	Kilbolane	Kanturk
Kilbroney	144	Orrery and Kilmore	Kilbroney	Mallow
Kilgrogan	231	Orrery and Kilmore	Kilgrogan	Mallow
Killabraher North	674	Orrery and Kilmore	Shandrum	Kanturk
Killabraher South	320	Orrery and Kilmore	Shandrum	Kanturk
Killaree	349	Orrery and Kilmore	Shandrum	Kilmallock
Kilmaclenine	609	Orrery and Kilmore	Kilmaclenine	Mallow
Kilmagoura	329	Orrery and Kilmore	Shandrum	Kanturk
Kilmore	334	Orrery and Kilmore	Kilbolane	Kanturk
Kilpatrick	290	Orrery and Kilmore	Ballyclogh	Mallow
Kiltass	90	Orrery and Kilmore	Cooliney	Kilmallock
Kiltoohig	357	Orrery and Kilmore	Ballyhay	Kilmallock
Kinteera	52	Orrery and Kilmore	Kilbolane	Kanturk
Kippane	110	Orrery and Kilmore	Shandrum	Kilmallock
Knockanare	389	Orrery and Kilmore	Buttevant	Mallow
Knockardamrum	310	Orrery and Kilmore	Ballyhay	Kilmallock
Knockardbane	429	Orrery and Kilmore	Liscarroll	Mallow
Knockaunavaddreen	432	Orrery and Kilmore	Kilmaclenine	Mallow
Knockbarry	330	Orrery and Kilmore	Buttevant	Mallow
Knockbarry	635	Orrery and Kilmore	Liscarroll	Mallow
Knockeen	141	Orrery and Kilmore	Kilbolane	Kanturk
Knocknavorahee	97	Orrery and Kilmore	Kilbolane	Kanturk
Knockough	242	Orrery and Kilmore	Kilbolane	Kanturk
Knockroundaly	173	Orrery and Kilmore	Kilbroney	Mallow
Kyle	181	Orrery and Kilmore	Kilbolane	Kanturk
Lackaroe	155	Orrery and Kilmore	Buttevant	Mallow
Lackaroe	563	Orrery and Kilmore	Liscarroll	Mallow
Lackeen	279	Orrery and Kilmore	Lackeen	Mallow
Lackfrancis	113	Orrery and Kilmore	Buttevant	Mallow
Laragh	542	Orrery and Kilmore	Kilbolane	Kanturk
Leap	133	Orrery and Kilmore	Churchtown	Mallow
**Liscarroll**	Town	Orrery and Kilmore	Liscarroll	Mallow
Liscarroll	116	Orrery and Kilmore	Liscarroll	Mallow
Liscullane	257	Orrery and Kilmore	Shandrum	Kilmallock
Lisgriffin	308	Orrery and Kilmore	Buttevant	Mallow
Liskelly	111	Orrery and Kilmore	Kilbroney	Mallow
Lisleagh	403	Orrery and Kilmore	Ballyclogh	Mallow
Lyragh	171	Orrery and Kilmore	Kilbolane	Kanturk
Maine North	815	Orrery and Kilmore	Kilbolane	Kanturk
Maine South	493	Orrery and Kilmore	Kilbolane	Kanturk
**Milford**	Town	Orrery and Kilmore	Kilbolane	Kanturk
Milltown	291	Orrery and Kilmore	Cooliney	Kilmallock
Milltown	80	Orrery and Kilmore	Aglishdrinagh	Kilmallock
Moanabricka	306	Orrery and Kilmore	Kilbolane	Kanturk
Moanarnane	179	Orrery and Kilmore	Kilbolane	Kanturk
Moanavraca	209	Orrery and Kilmore	Kilbolane	Kanturk
Moanroe	116	Orrery and Kilmore	Kilbolane	Kanturk
Moanroe	75	Orrery and Kilmore	Churchtown	Mallow
Mount North	535	Orrery and Kilmore	Ballyclogh	Mallow
Mountbridget	240	Orrery and Kilmore	Churchtown	Mallow
Mountcorbitt	175	Orrery and Kilmore	Churchtown	Mallow
Moyge	840	Orrery and Kilmore	Liscarroll	Mallow
**Newtown**	Town	Orrery and Kilmore	Shandrum	Kanturk
Newtown North	228	Orrery and Kilmore	Shandrum	Kanturk
Newtown South	229	Orrery and Kilmore	Shandrum	Kanturk
Pepperhill	156	Orrery and Kilmore	Buttevant	Mallow
Poulnareagha	139	Orrery and Kilmore	Buttevant	Mallow
Prohust	609	Orrery and Kilmore	Kilbolane	Kanturk
Rath	287	Orrery and Kilmore	Churchtown	Mallow
Rathclare	443	Orrery and Kilmore	Buttevant	Mallow
Rathgoggan Middle	529	Orrery and Kilmore	Rathgoggan	Kilmallock
Rathgoggan North	685	Orrery and Kilmore	Rathgoggan	Kilmallock
Rathgoggan South	335	Orrery and Kilmore	Rathgoggan	Kilmallock
Rathmorgan	541	Orrery and Kilmore	Ballyhay	Kilmallock
Rathnacally	319	Orrery and Kilmore	Cooliney	Kilmallock
Rathnee	178	Orrery and Kilmore	Ballyclogh	Mallow
Rockspring	350	Orrery and Kilmore	Liscarroll	Mallow
Rossnanarney	336	Orrery and Kilmore	Liscarroll	Mallow
Rusheen	439	Orrery and Kilmore	Corcomohide	Kanturk
Sally Park	249	Orrery and Kilmore	Liscarroll	Mallow
Scart	221	Orrery and Kilmore	Kilbolane	Kanturk
Scart	595	Orrery and Kilmore	Ballyclogh	Mallow
Seeds	276	Orrery and Kilmore	Kilbolane	Kanturk
Shandrum	625	Orrery and Kilmore	Shandrum	Kilmallock
Sheskin	203	Orrery and Kilmore	Tullylease	Kanturk
Shinanagh	231	Orrery and Kilmore	Shandrum	Kanturk
Shronepookeen	276	Orrery and Kilmore	Kilbolane	Kanturk
Spital	505	Orrery and Kilmore	Buttevant	Mallow
Teeracurra	143	Orrery and Kilmore	Kilbolane	Kanturk
Teeveny	829	Orrery and Kilmore	Shandrum	Kanturk
Templeconnell	226	Orrery and Kilmore	Kilbroney	Mallow
Templemary	754	Orrery and Kilmore	Buttevant	Mallow
Tinnascart	405	Orrery and Kilmore	Buttevant	Mallow
Trienieragh	270	Orrery and Kilmore	Kilbolane	Kanturk
Tullacondra	220	Orrery and Kilmore	Ballyclogh	Mallow
Tullig	177	Orrery and Kilmore	Bregoge	Mallow
Velvetstown	709	Orrery and Kilmore	Buttevant	Mallow
Walshestown	438	Orrery and Kilmore	Churchtown	Mallow
Waterhouse	224	Orrery and Kilmore	Buttevant	Mallow
