= Castlehyde =

Townland and estate in County Cork, Ireland

Castlehyde Irish: Carraig an Éidigh
- Townland
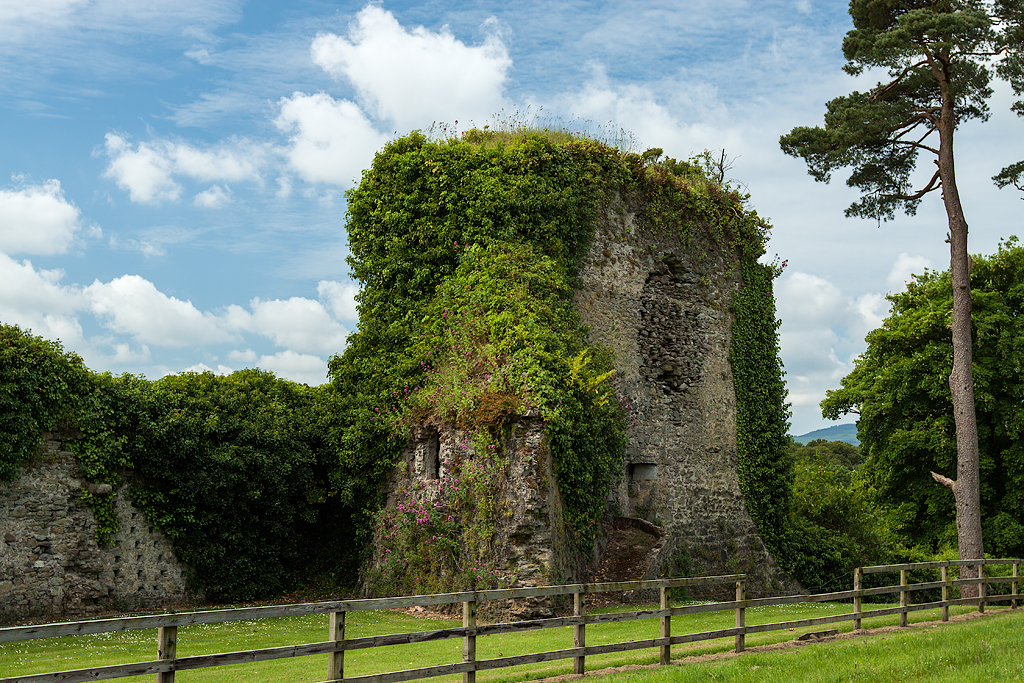
- Ruin of the Norman-era Castle Hyde tower house, formerly Carriganeide

- Location within Ireland
- Coordinates: 52.141°N 8.314°W
- Country: Ireland
- County: County Cork
- Barony: Condons and Clangibbon
- Civil parish: Fermoy

Area
  - Total: 32 ha (79 acres)

Castlehyde (Irish: Carraig an Éidigh) is a townland and estate, slightly west of Fermoy in County Cork, Ireland. The estate's manor house, Castlehyde House, had been the ancestral home of Douglas Hyde's family and is one of several houses owned by Irish dancer Michael Flatley.

The townland of Castlehyde, which is c. 32 hectares (79 acres) in area, is in the civil parish of Fermoy and the historical barony of Condons and Clangibbon. It is bordered by Castlehyde East (198 hectares (490 acres)), in which Castlehyde House is located, and Castlehyde West (17 hectares (42 acres)).

== History ==
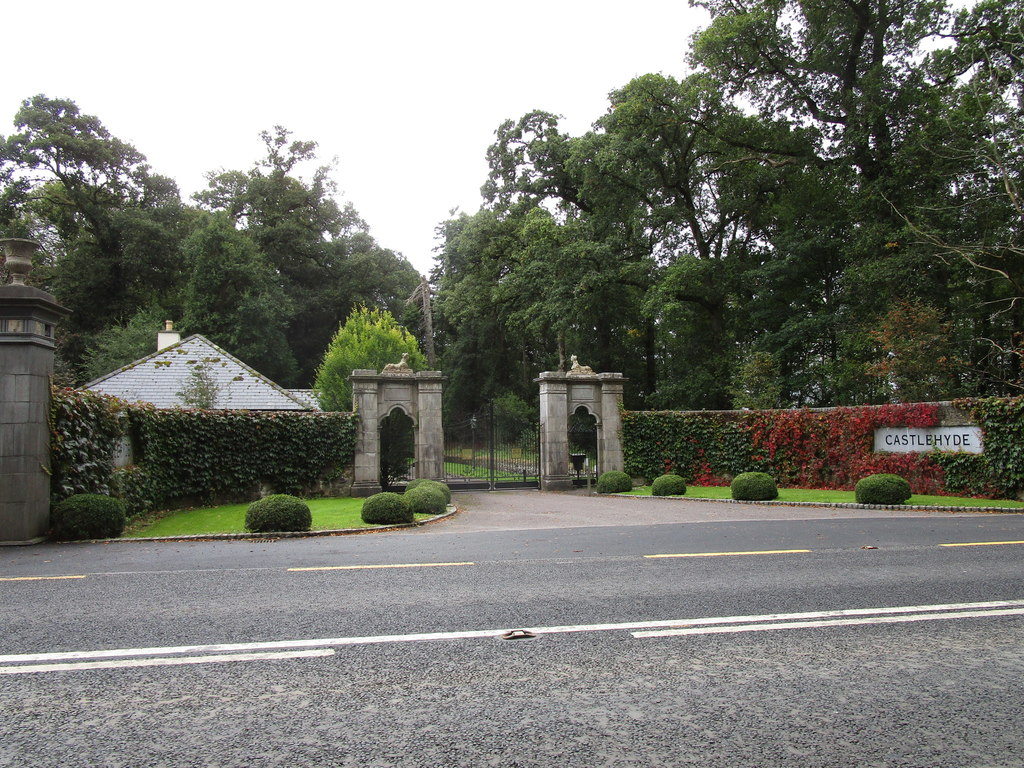
Entrance gateway and signage at Castlehyde

Initially associated with the Norman Condon family, a four-storey tower house on the site is dated by some sources to the 13th century. Also known as Carriganeide, Carrygnedye or Temple Iogan, this tower house was in use until at least the 16th century. Following the Desmond Rebellions in the late 16th century, the castle and its lands were seized by the English Crown from the then Earl of Desmond, and granted to Arthur Hyde. The estate subsequently became known as Castle Hyde, and was occupied by the Hyde family for several hundred years.

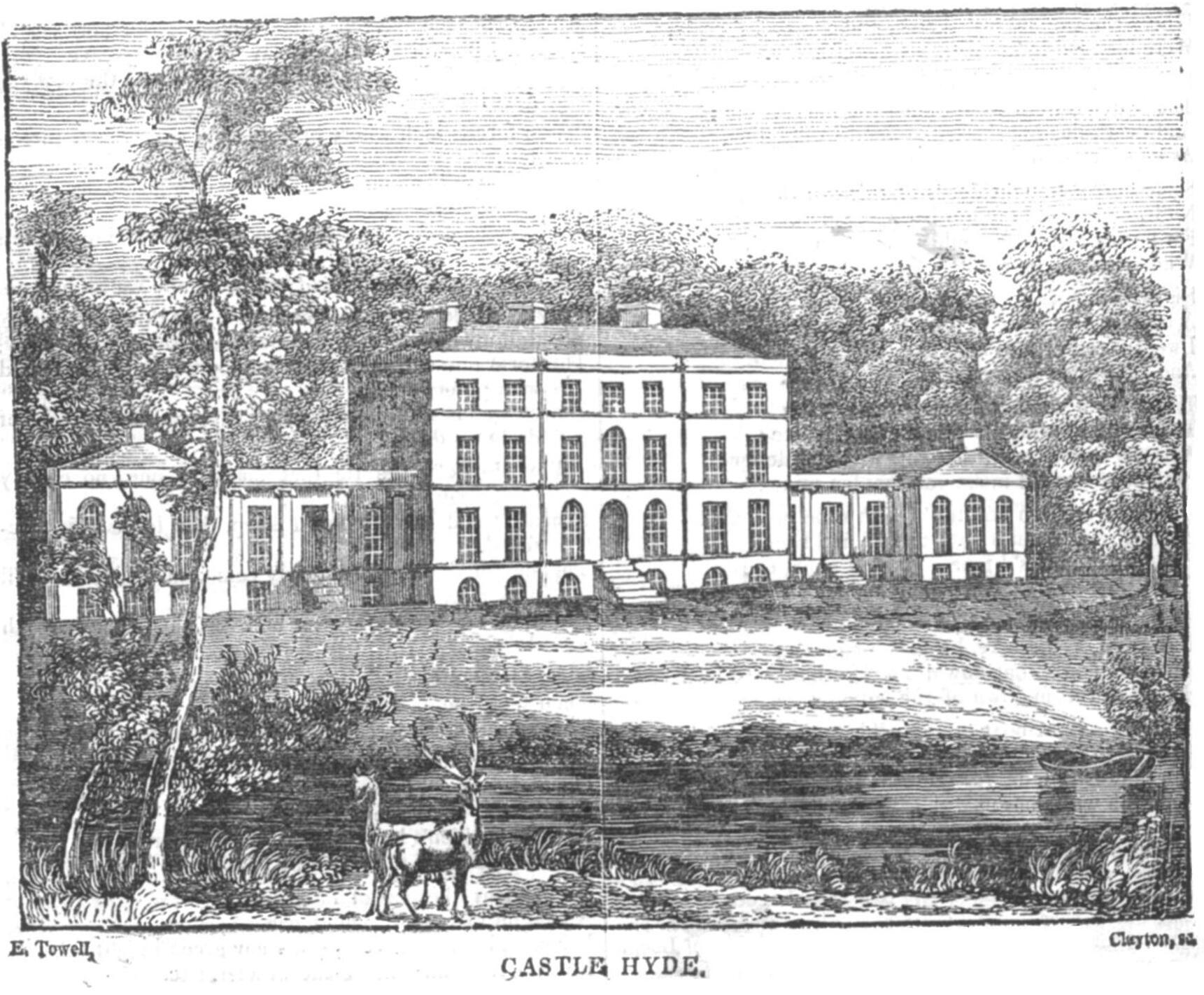
Castle Hyde, Dublin Penny Journal 1835

A later manor house was constructed for the Hyde family, close to the site of the earlier tower house. These initial works were completed, c. 1790, by architect Davis Ducart. Additional expansion works were completed by Abraham Hargrave, a Cork-based builder and architect, c. 1800.

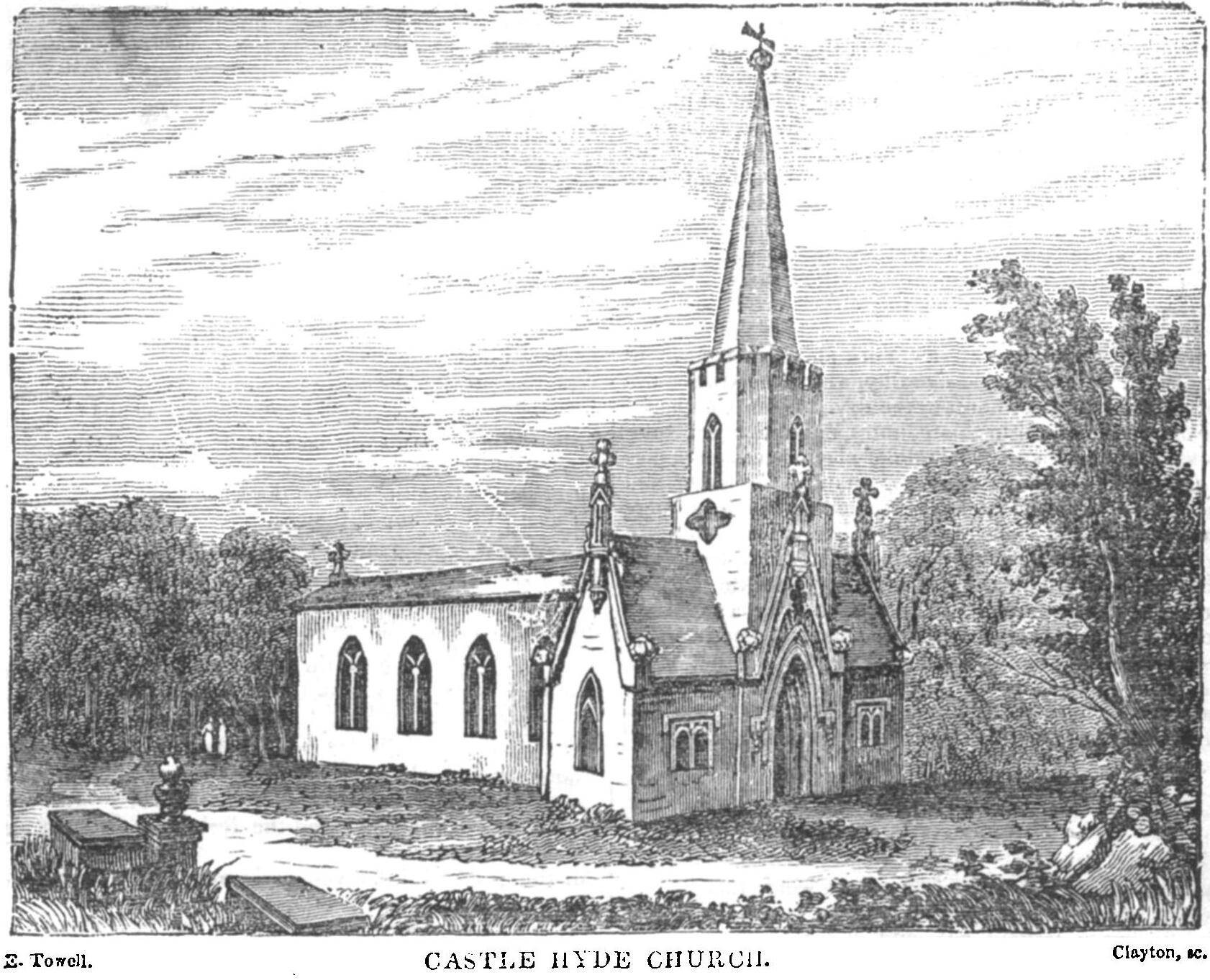
Castle Hyde Church, 1835

A Gothic revival church, built in 1809 by G.R. Pain for John Hyde, is located to the north of the house.

In the early 1850s, the Hyde estate of over 11,600 acres, including land in the baronies of Fermoy, Condons and Clangibbon and Imokilly in County Cork and Clanwilliam, Eliogarty and Middlethird in County Tipperary, was advertised for sale. Documents in the Irish National Archives refer to the sale of the Hyde estate, attributing it to "mismanagement of the estates by agents rather than to any faults on the part of the possessors".

At the time of the sale in 1851, Castlehyde House was occupied by Spencer Cosby Price, the brother-in-law of John Hyde. The house passed through several owners, including members of the Wrixon-Becher family, and by the 1940s the building was reputedly "occupied by the military".

The house, which is a protected structure, was purchased and renovated in 1999 by Michael Flatley. As of mid-2020, Flatley was reputedly seeking to sell the property, but subsequently decided against the sale stating that he was "too emotionally attached to Castlehyde".
