= Gurraneachoel =

Townland in County Cork, Ireland

Coordinates: 52.172°N 8.523°W

Gurraneachoel or Garranachole (Irish: Garrán an Cheoil) is a townland in Castletownroche, County Cork, Ireland. Its English translation means "the crossroads of music". The townland is 1.7 square kilometres (0.66 sq mi) in area.
