= List of townlands of the barony of Fermoy =

This is a sortable table of the townlands in the barony of Fermoy, County Cork, Ireland. Duplicate names occur where there is more than one townland with the same name in the barony, and also where a townland is known by two alternative names. Names marked in bold typeface are towns and villages, and the word Town appears for those entries in the area column.

== Townland list ==
Townland	Area (acres)	Civil parish	Poor law union
Acres	141	Litter	Fermoy
Aghaburren	220	Imphrick	Mallow
Anegrove	412	Castletownroche	Fermoy
Annabella	393	Mallow	Mallow
Annakisha	51	Carrigleamleary	Mallow
Annakisha North	596	Clenor	Mallow
Annakisha South	271	Clenor	Mallow
Ardadam	121	Doneraile	Mallow
Ardleag	117	Wallstown	Mallow
Ardskeagh	210	Ardskeagh	Mallow
Ashgrove	102	Mallow	Mallow
Ballinaltig Beg	159	Castletownroche	Fermoy
Ballincurrig	417	Monanimy	Mallow
Ballindangan	662	Ballydeloughy	Mitchelstown
Ballinglanna South	39	Kilcrumper	Fermoy
Ballinree	250	Doneraile	Mallow
Ballintantassig	102	Glanworth	Mitchelstown
Ballintlea North	951	Doneraile	Mallow
Ballintlea South	952	Doneraile	Mallow
Ballinvoher	637	Castletownroche	Fermoy
Ballinvonear	1,429	Doneraile	Mallow
Ballinvuskig East	150	Rahan	Mallow
Ballinvuskig West	500	Rahan	Mallow
Ballyadeen	553	Castletownroche	Fermoy
Ballyandrew	428	Doneraile	Mallow
Ballybrack	406	Caherduggan	Mallow
Ballyclogh	686	Glanworth	Fermoy
Ballydague	1,131	Kilcummer	Fermoy
Ballydaheen	303	Wallstown	Mallow
Ballydahin	281	Mallow	Mallow
Ballydeloughy	656	Ballydeloughy	Mitchelstown
Ballydineen	161	Doneraile	Mallow
Ballydineen	190	Caherduggan	Mallow
Ballydoyle	776	Castletownroche	Fermoy
Ballyduff	237	Monanimy	Mallow
Ballyellis	13	Templeroan	Mallow
Ballyellis	132	Wallstown	Mallow
Ballyellis	332	Mallow	Mallow
Ballyellis	562	Doneraile	Mallow
Ballyenahan South	593	Derryvillane	Mitchelstown
Ballygarrane	347	Clenor	Mallow
Ballygarrett	216	Mallow	Mallow
Ballygown	403	Clenor	Mallow
Ballygriffin	532	Monanimy	Mallow
Ballygriggin	155	Wallstown	Mallow
Ballygrillihan	217	Castletownroche	Fermoy
Ballyguyroe North	830	Farahy	Mitchelstown
Ballyguyroe South	339	Farahy	Mitchelstown
Ballyhay	221	Ballyhay	Mallow
Ballyhimock	351	Castletownroche	Fermoy
Ballyhindon	264	Kilcrumper	Fermoy
**Ballyhooly**	Town	Ballyhooly	Fermoy
Ballyhooly North	585	Ballyhooly	Fermoy
Ballyhooly South	1,176	Ballyhooly	Fermoy
Ballyhoura	838	Imphrick	Mallow
Ballyhourode	107	Templeroan	Mallow
Ballykeating	437	Glanworth	Fermoy
Ballylegan	387	Glanworth	Fermoy
Ballylopen	210	Ardskeagh	Mallow
Ballylopen	210	Ardskeagh	Mallow
Ballylopen	425	Kilquane	Mallow
Ballylopen	425	Kilquane	Mallow
Ballymacallen	214	Killathy	Fermoy
Ballymaclawrence	226	Killathy	Fermoy
Ballymacmoy	638	Monanimy	Mallow
Ballymacphilip	333	Killathy	Fermoy
**Ballymagooly**	Town	Rahan	Mallow
Ballymagooly	187	Rahan	Mallow
Ballymague	432	Caherduggan	Mallow
Ballymee	212	Caherduggan	Mallow
Ballynaboola	192	Ballyhay	Mallow
Ballynaboola West	257	Ballyhay	Mallow
Ballynageehy	518	Monanimy	Mallow
Ballynageragh	324	Imphrick	Mallow
Ballynahalisk	531	St. Nathlash	Mitchelstown
Ballynamona	295	Templeroan	Mallow
Ballynamona	424	Glanworth	Fermoy
Ballynamongaree	201	Glanworth	Fermoy
Ballynamuddagh	250	Killathy	Fermoy
Ballynaraha	269	Glanworth	Fermoy
Ballynoe	327	Farahy	Mitchelstown
Ballynoe West	44	Glanworth	Fermoy
Ballyquane	188	Dunmahon	Fermoy
Ballyshane	245	Doneraile	Mallow
Ballyshehan	275	Carrigleamleary	Mallow
Ballyshonock	531	Farahy	Mitchelstown
Ballyveelick	183	Castletownroche	Mallow
Ballyviniter Lower	400	Mallow	Mallow
Ballyviniter Middle	464	Mallow	Mallow
Ballyviniter Upper	547	Mallow	Mallow
Ballyvoddy	354	St. Nathlash	Mitchelstown
Ballyvorisheen	157	Rahan	Mallow
Ballyvoskillakeen	113	Kilcrumper	Fermoy
Ballywalter	282	Wallstown	Mallow
Ballywalter Demesne	128	Wallstown	Mallow
Baltydaniel West	410	Caherduggan	Mallow
Balytdaniel East	646	Caherduggan	Mallow
Banefune	127	Caherduggan	Mallow
Bearforest Lower	104	Mallow	Mallow
Bearforest Upper	121	Mallow	Mallow
Beennaskehy	349	Monanimy	Mallow
Boherash	259	Glanworth	Fermoy
Boherderroge	119	Kilcrumper	Fermoy
Bridgetown Lower	553	Bridgetown	Fermoy
Bridgetown Upper	540	Bridgetown	Fermoy
Brough	141	Doneraile	Mallow
Byblox	100	Doneraile	Mallow
Caherconnor	213	Imphrick	Mallow
Caherduggan North	334	Caherduggan	Mallow
Caherduggan South	468	Caherduggan	Mallow
Cahermee	275	Caherduggan	Mallow
Cappagh	283	Monanimy	Mallow
Cappagh	334	Killathy	Fermoy
Carhoo	97	Kildorrery	Mitchelstown
Carhookeal	161	Mallow	Mallow
Carker	239	Doneraile	Mallow
Carker Middle	514	Doneraile	Mallow
Carker North	1,109	Doneraile	Mallow
Carkerbeg	245	Doneraile	Mallow
Carrig Demesne	279	Carrigleamleary	Mallow
Carrigacunna	510	Monanimy	Mallow
Carrigaunroe	410	Templeroan	Mallow
Carrigdownane Lower	310	Carrigdownane	Mitchelstown
Carrigdownane Upper	302	Carrigdownane	Mitchelstown
Carrigeen	367	Doneraile	Mallow
Carrigleagh	246	Wallstown	Mallow
Carrigleagh	287	Templeroan	Mallow
Carrigoon	329	Rahan	Mallow
Carrigoon Beg	187	Mallow	Mallow
Carrigoon More	161	Mallow	Mallow
Carrigpark	309	Carrigleamleary	Mallow
Castleaffron	485	Doneraile	Mallow
Castleblagh	1,516	Ballyhooly	Fermoy
Castlehyde West	103	Litter	Fermoy
Castlekevin	394	Clenor	Mallow
Castlelands	226	Mallow	Mallow
Castlepook North	1,455	Doneraile	Mallow
Castlepook South	541	Doneraile	Mallow
Castleterry	288	Ballydeloughy	Mitchelstown
**Castletownroche**	Town	Castletownroche	Fermoy
Castletownroche	804	Castletownroche	Fermoy
Castlewidenham	184	Castletownroche	Fermoy
Clenor North	306	Clenor	Mallow
Clenor South	220	Clenor	Mallow
Clifford	128	Bridgetown	Fermoy
Clogheen	442	Caherduggan	Mallow
Clogher	375	Templeroan	Mallow
Clogher Demesne	108	Templeroan	Mallow
Cloghlucas North	292	Mallow	Mallow
Cloghlucas South	269	Mallow	Mallow
Cloghvoolia North	1,313	Monanimy	Mallow
Cloghvoolia South	758	Monanimy	Mallow
Clontinty	148	Glanworth	Fermoy
Cloon	109	Bridgetown	Fermoy
Cloonbane	87	Doneraile	Mallow
Cloustoge	251	Doneraile	Mallow
Commonage	13	Rahan	Mallow
Commons	25	Ballydeloughy	Mitchelstown
Commons	9	Litter	Fermoy
Connaberry	106	Castletownroche	Fermoy
Conva	714	Ballyhooly	Fermoy
Cooldurragha	307	Clenor	Mallow
Cooldurragha	691	Carrigleamleary	Mallow
Cooleen	328	Ballyhay	Mallow
Coolinny	177	Killathy	Fermoy
Corbally	372	Glanworth	Fermoy
Cornahinch	161	Caherduggan	Mallow
Cregg North	187	Litter	Fermoy
Cregg South	238	Litter	Fermoy
Creggolympry North	311	Litter	Fermoy
Creggolympry South	191	Litter	Fermoy
Croaghnacree	245	Doneraile	Mallow
Cuppage	227	Dunmahon	Fermoy
Curraghagalla North	282	Glanworth	Fermoy
Curraghagalla South	140	Glanworth	Fermoy
Curraghakerry	193	Caherduggan	Mallow
Curraghanaltig	404	Wallstown	Mallow
Curraghanearla	153	Mallow	Mallow
Curraghawaddra	105	Monanimy	Mallow
Curraghoo Beg	291	Glanworth	Mitchelstown
Curraghoo More	198	Glanworth	Fermoy
Curraghphadeen	143	Mallow	Mallow
Dannanstown	145	Templeroan	Mallow
Demesne	413	Doneraile	Mallow
Derryvillane	540	Derryvillane	Mitchelstown
**Doneraile**	Town	Doneraile	Mallow
Doneraile	105	Doneraile	Mallow
Doonawanly	235	Wallstown	Mallow
Downing North	329	Kilcrumper	Fermoy
Downing South	293	Kilcrumper	Fermoy
Dromdeer	208	Clenor	Mallow
Dromdeer East	352	Doneraile	Mallow
Dromdeer West	101	Doneraile	Mallow
Dromin	106	Imphrick	Mallow
Dromrahan	225	Rahan	Mallow
Dromroe Commons	84	Caherduggan	Mallow
Dromsiveen	82	Carrigleamleary	Mallow
Dromsligo	455	Mallow	Mallow
Dunmahon	599	Dunmahon	Fermoy
Farahy	1,127	Farahy	Mitchelstown
Farramlahassery West	169	Dunmahon	Fermoy
Fiddane North	915	Rahan	Mallow
Fiddane South	560	Rahan	Mallow
Firville East	8	Mallow	Mallow
Garranachole	124	Castletownroche	Mallow
Garranachole	296	Clenor	Mallow
Garrane	1,211	Ardskeagh	Mallow
Garryhintoge	330	Doneraile	Mallow
Glandonohoe	1,227	Bridgetown	Fermoy
Glannagear	423	Monanimy	Mallow
**Glanworth**	Town	Glanworth	Fermoy
Glanworth	435	Glanworth	Fermoy
Glennahulla	365	Ballydeloughy	Mitchelstown
Glenwood	36	Kilcrumper	Fermoy
Gooldshill	285	Mallow	Mallow
Gortaneelig	221	Rahan	Mallow
Gortnagraiga	393	Mourneabbey	Mallow
Gortore	198	Kilcrumper	Fermoy
Gortroche	1,259	Ballyhooly	Fermoy
Graig	381	Templeroan	Mallow
Graig Upper	600	Templeroan	Mallow
Grandy	189	Clenor	Mallow
Grange	357	Bridgetown	Fermoy
Gurteen	256	Killathy	Fermoy
Horseclose	77	Doneraile	Mallow
Imphrick	181	Imphrick	Mallow
Inchakevin	85	Wallstown	Mallow
Inchinapallas	335	Killathy	Fermoy
Inchnagree	262	Doneraile	Mallow
Island	679	Rahan	Mallow
Johnstown East	521	Dunmahon	Fermoy
Johnstown West	462	Dunmahon	Fermoy
Keatleysclose	72	Mallow	Mallow
Kilbrack	369	Doneraile	Mallow
Kilburn	204	Caherduggan	Mallow
Kilcanway	670	Carrigleamleary	Mallow
Kilcolman East	209	Doneraile	Mallow
Kilcolman Middle	233	Doneraile	Mallow
Kilcolman West	751	Doneraile	Mallow
Kilconnor	215	Doneraile	Mallow
Kilcummer Lower	188	Kilcummer	Fermoy
Kilcummer Upper	655	Kilcummer	Fermoy
Kilknockan	198	Mallow	Mallow
Killagrohan	374	Mallow	Mallow
Killathy	614	Killathy	Fermoy
**Killawillin**	Town	Monanimy	Mallow
Killeagh	331	Glanworth	Fermoy
Killeenemer	414	Killeenemer	Mitchelstown
Killetra	344	Mallow	Mallow
Killissane	232	Monanimy	Mallow
Killuragh	360	Clenor	Mallow
Kilmacoom	242	Caherduggan	Mallow
Kilmaculla	66	Kildorrery	Mitchelstown
Kilquane	321	Bridgetown	Fermoy
Kilvickanease	98	Doneraile	Mallow
Kingston's-fields	43	Litter	Fermoy
Knockacappul	183	Wallstown	Mallow
Knockacullata	796	Monanimy	Mallow
Knockacur	138	Doneraile	Mallow
Knockananig	971	Litter	Fermoy
Knockanannig	593	Rahan	Mallow
Knockaroura	339	Mallow	Mallow
Knockbrack	103	Doneraile	Mallow
Knockbrack	1,286	Rahan	Mallow
Knocknamadderee	261	Killathy	Fermoy
Knockwatear	324	Monanimy	Mallow
Knoppoge	399	Mallow	Mallow
Knuttery	807	Rahan	Mallow
Kylenahoory	95	Kilcummer	Fermoy
Lackabrack	36	Wallstown	Mallow
Lackanalooha	79	Mallow	Mallow
Lackanamona	305	Carrigleamleary	Mallow
Lag	382	Caherduggan	Mallow
Laght	131	Glanworth	Fermoy
Laharan	96	Dunmahon	Fermoy
Lavally Lower	119	Rahan	Mallow
Lavally Upper	808	Rahan	Mallow
Leaselands	87	Mallow	Mallow
Lisballyhay	514	Imphrick	Mallow
Lisheen	211	Killathy	Fermoy
Lisleagh	184	Kilgullane	Fermoy
Lisnagoorneen	183	Carrigdownane	Fermoy
Lisnagoorneen	482	Castletownroche	Fermoy
Lisnagrough	133	Caherduggan	Mallow
Lisnasallagh	33	Kilcrumper	Fermoy
Lissanisky	301	Carrigleamleary	Mallow
Lodge	287	Mallow	Mallow
Lougharuane	304	Castletownroche	Fermoy
Lougheagle	167	Doneraile	Mallow
Loughlea	432	Imphrick	Mallow
Loughnahilly	175	Kilcrumper	Fermoy
Loughquin	179	Wallstown	Mallow
**Mallow**	Town	Mallow	Mallow
Mallow	172	Mallow	Mallow
Meadstown	492	Farahy	Mitchelstown
Monanimy Lower	439	Monanimy	Mallow
Monanimy Upper	388	Monanimy	Mallow
Monee East	404	Rahan	Mallow
Monee West	430	Rahan	Mallow
Moneen	277	Glanworth	Fermoy
Moorepark West	84	Kilcrumper	Fermoy
Mountnagle	307	Carrigleamleary	Mallow
Mountrussell	43	Carrigleamleary	Mallow
Naglesborough	224	Castletownroche	Fermoy
Newtown	203	Doneraile	Mallow
Newtown	520	Ballyhay	Mitchelstown
Oldcourt	240	Doneraile	Mallow
Park North	309	Doneraile	Mallow
Park South	191	Doneraile	Mallow
Parkacunna	84	Castletownroche	Fermoy
Parkadallane	70	Mallow	Mallow
Poulleagh	49	Farahy	Mallow
Poulleagh	96	Templeroan	Mallow
Powerstown	385	Clenor	Mallow
Pruntus	481	Ballyhay	Mitchelstown
Quartertown Lower	494	Mourneabbey	Mallow
Quartertown Upper	493	Mourneabbey	Mallow
Rahan	1,263	Rahan	Mallow
Ransborough	139	St. Nathlash	Mitchelstown
Rathdaggan	69	Glanworth	Fermoy
Rathglassane	296	Ardskeagh	Mallow
Rathnacarton	293	Castletownroche	Mallow
Renny Lower	175	Kilcummer	Fermoy
Renny Upper	366	Kilcummer	Fermoy
Richardstown	371	Caherduggan	Mallow
Rockforest East	255	Rahan	Mallow
Rockforest West	170	Rahan	Mallow
**Rockmills**	Town	St. Nathlash	Mitchelstown
Rossagh East	260	Doneraile	Mallow
Rossagh West	307	Doneraile	Mallow
Rossaghroe	265	Doneraile	Mallow
Sandville	470	Glanworth	Fermoy
Scarour	66	Castletownroche	Fermoy
Scarteen	160	Mallow	Mallow
Shanagh	276	Templeroan	Mallow
**Shanballymore**	Town	Templeroan	Mallow
Shanballymore Lower	250	Templeroan	Mallow
Shanballymore Upper	354	Templeroan	Mallow
Sheepwalk West	75	Litter	Fermoy
Shinanagh	312	Imphrick	Mallow
Skaghardgannon	182	Doneraile	Mallow
Skahanagh Beg	463	Doneraile	Mallow
Skahanagh More	550	Doneraile	Mallow
Skenakilla	317	Castletownroche	Fermoy
Sleemana	198	Castletownroche	Fermoy
Sorrel	436	Ballyhay	Mitchelstown
Spaglen	438	Mallow	Mallow
Springvale	237	Kildorrery	Mitchelstown
Streamhill East	1,623	Doneraile	Mallow
Streamhill West	896	Doneraile	Mallow
String	240	Glanworth	Fermoy
Sycamore	132	Doneraile	Mallow
Tankardstwon	600	Farahy	Mitchelstown
Templenoe	397	Litter	Fermoy
Toomore	209	Monanimy	Mallow
Tooreen	350	Monanimy	Mallow
Twopothouse	411	Caherduggan	Mallow
Wallstown	565	Wallstown	Mallow
Waterdyke	160	Templeroan	Mallow
