= Killavullen =

Village in County Cork, Ireland

Killavullen Irish: Cill an Mhuilinn
- Village
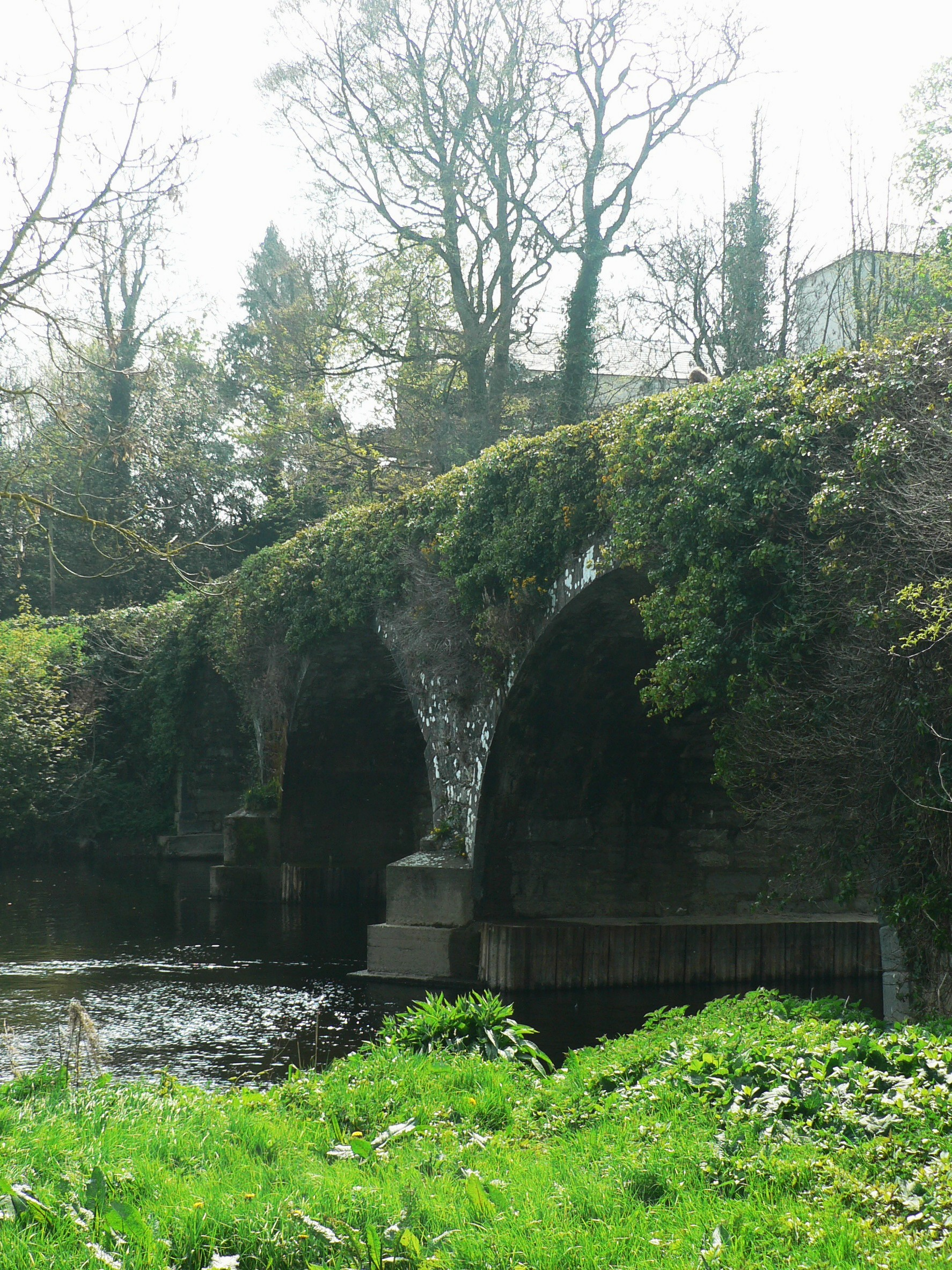
- Killavullen bridge spanning the River Blackwater

- Location in Ireland
- Coordinates: 52°08′50″N 08°30′54″W
- Country: Ireland
- Province: Munster
- County: County Cork

Population (2016)
  - Total: 267
- Time zone: UTC+0 (WET)
  - Summer (DST): UTC-1 (IST (WEST))

Killavullen (Irish: Cill an Mhuilinn, meaning 'the Church of the Mill') is a village on the river Blackwater, in County Cork, Ireland. The village is located just south of the N72 road, between Mallow and Castletownroche. It is 10 km (6.2 mi) east of Mallow and 32 km (20 mi) north of Cork city. The census of 2002 put the population at 224. The parish of Killavullen & Annakissa contains close to 1500 people.

The modern parish includes the former parish of Annakissa. The church in the village was built in 1839 and is dedicated to St. Nicholas.

Edmund Burke, parliamentarian and philosopher, received some of his early education in a hedge school in Killavullen. Nano Nagle, founder of the Presentation Sisters, was born near Killavullen (in Ballygriffin) in 1718.

== Ballymacmoy House ==
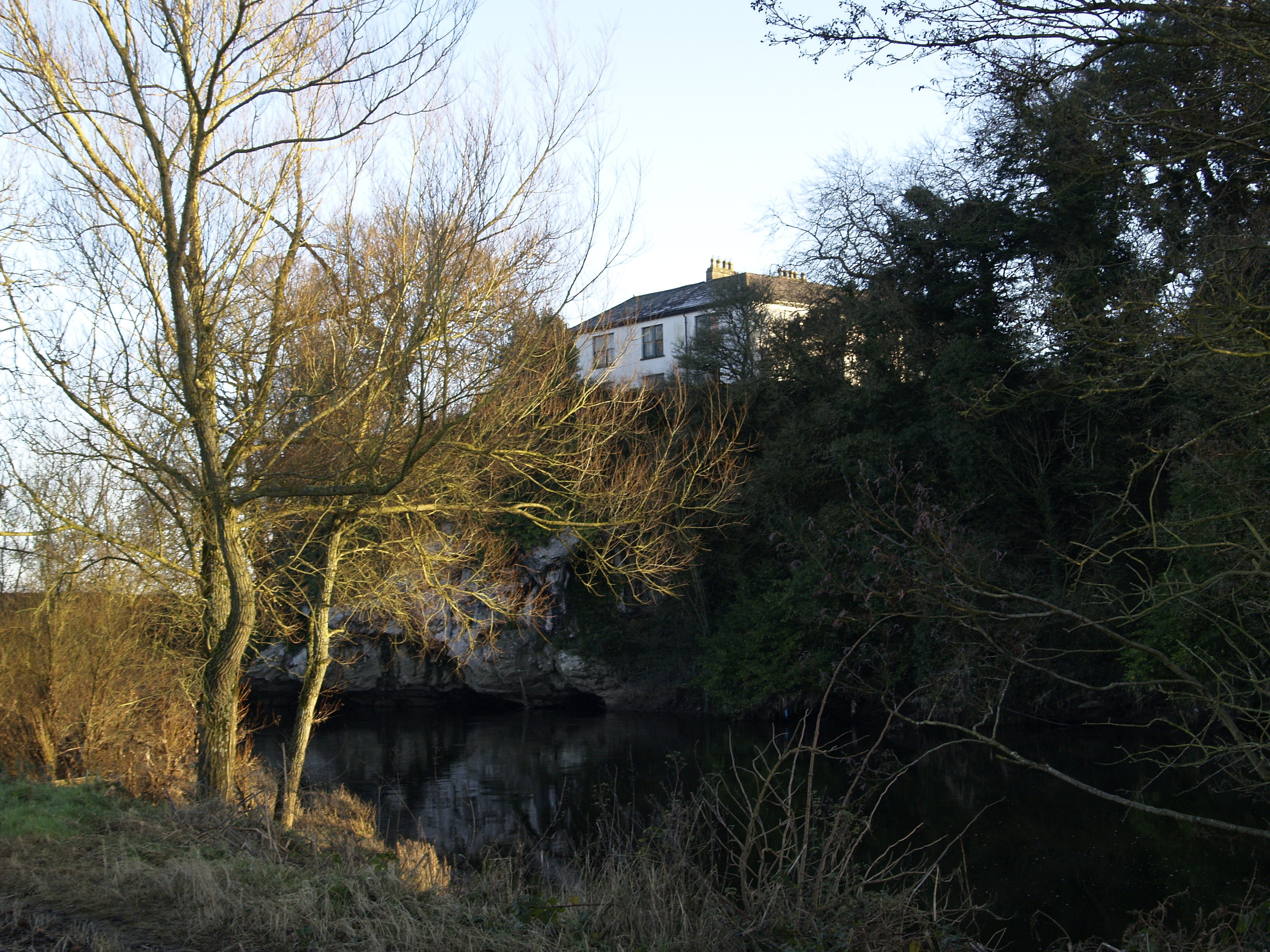
Ballymacmoy house, Killavullen

The village contains Ballymacmoy House, home of the Hennessy family of Cognac fame. The present house was built in 1818. The original was a short distance up river.

== Community and amenities ==
Killavullen GAA is the local Gaelic Athletic Association club and fields teams in hurling and Gaelic football.

The Killavullen Caves are a series of limestone caves located close to the village alongside the River Blackwater.

== See also ==
- List of towns and villages in Ireland
