= Glanworth =

Village in County Cork, Ireland

Glanworth Gleannúir (Irish)
- Village
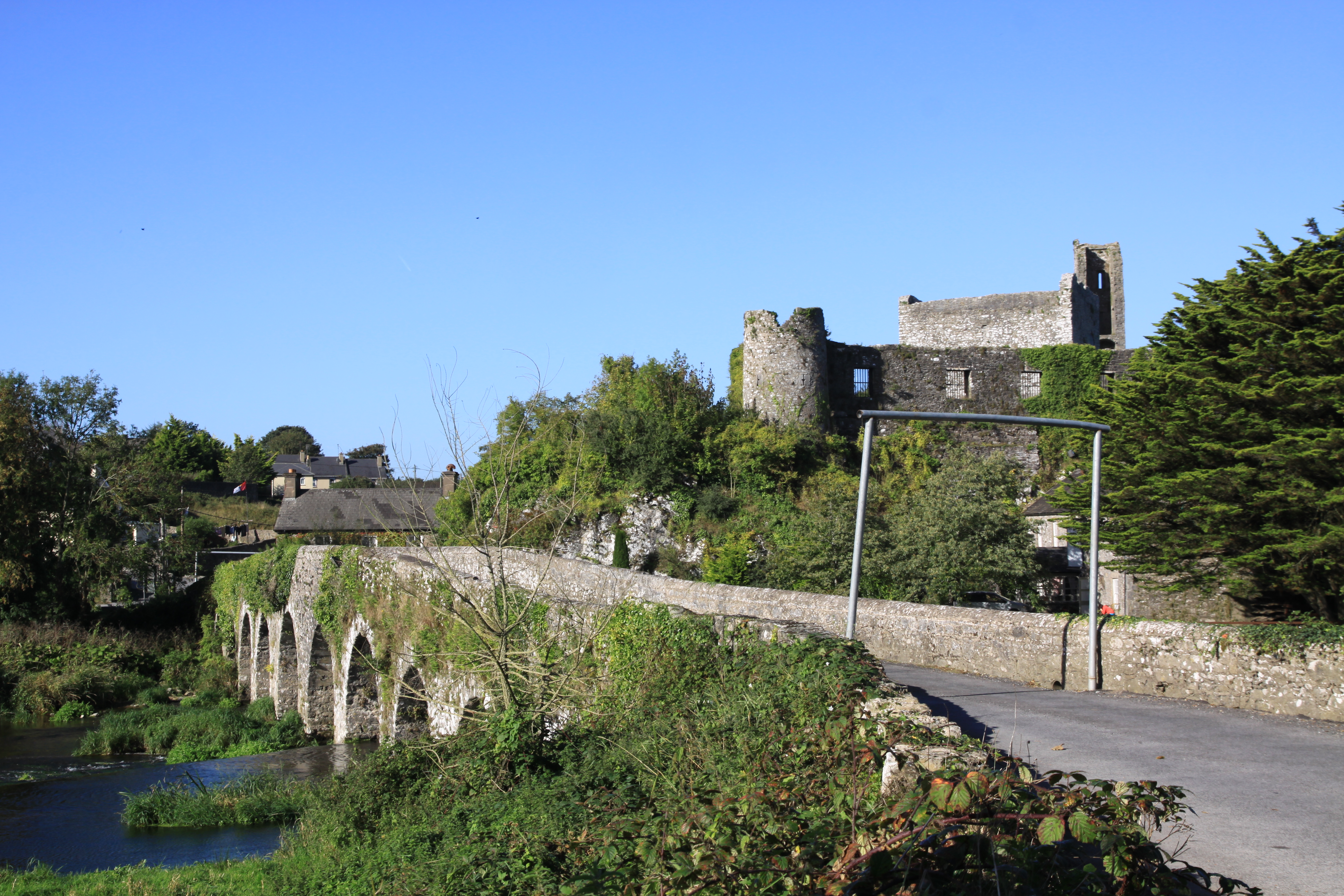
- Glanworth bridge and castle

- Location in Ireland
- Coordinates: 52.187°N 8.356°W
- Country: Ireland
- Province: Munster
- County: County Cork
- Elevation: 177 m (581 ft)

Population (2022)
  - Total: 628
- Time zone: UTC+0 (WET)
  - Summer (DST): IST (WEST)
- Irish Grid Reference: R7569403751

Glanworth (Irish: Gleannúir, meaning 'yew valley') is a village on the R512 regional road in County Cork, Ireland. It lies approximately 8 kilometres (5 mi) northwest of the town of Fermoy and 40 km (25 mi) northeast of Cork city. As of 2022, Glanworth's population was 628.

Glanworth has a Roman Catholic church, a school, one shop and two pubs. The village is locally known as 'The Harbour'. This is believed to stem from the Latin word, arbor, meaning tree, a reference to three oak trees that grew in Market Square and were a popular meeting place for locals. The village is in a townland and civil parish of the same name. Glanworth is within the Cork East Dáil constituency.

== Built heritage ==
=== Labbacallee megalithic tomb ===
Dated to the early Bronze Age, Labbacallee wedge tomb is located 1.5 miles (2.4 km) from Glanworth and is the largest wedge tomb in Ireland.

=== Glanworth Castle ===
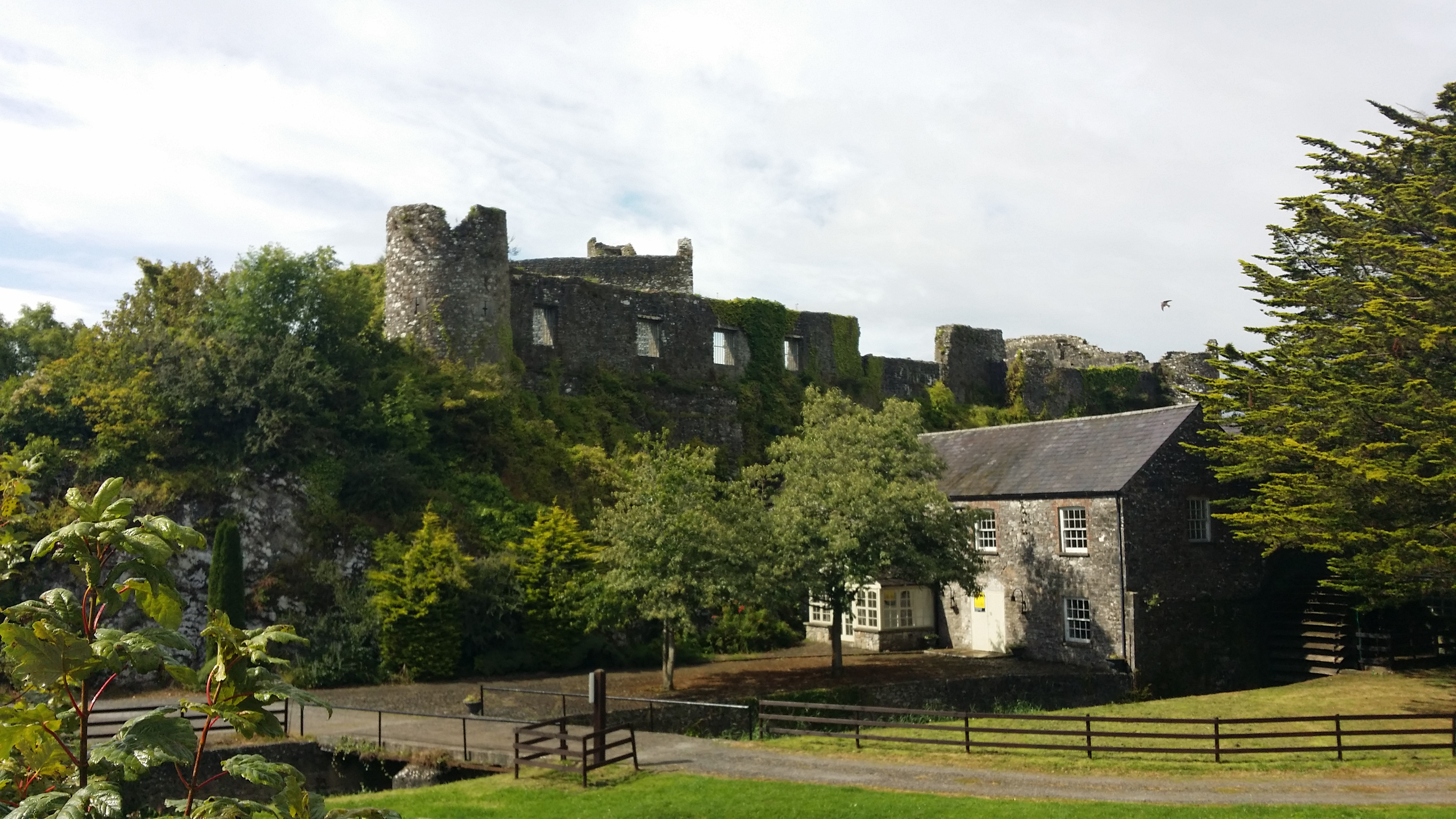
Glanworth Castle

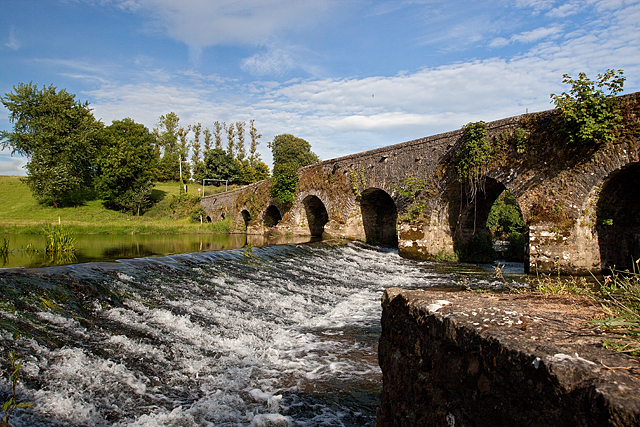
Glanworth Bridge over the River Funshion

The 13th-century Glanworth Castle was built beside the River Funshion by the Condon family, Norman settlers who arrived in the Cork area in the twelfth century. The keep and the castle wall remain. The castle is now used mainly as a public walk.

=== Glanworth Abbey ===
Glanworth Abbey was also built in the 13th century, next to the castle, by the Dominican order. The priory was desecrated in the 16th century. The priory's gable tracery window, now restored, was once part of the Protestant church, which is located in the Catholic graveyard.

=== Glanworth Bridge ===
Built in the mid-17th century, Glanworth Bridge is a narrow 13-arch bridge, and one of the oldest remaining examples in the region. According to The Corkman, it is said to be the "narrowest and oldest public bridge in everyday use" in Europe.

=== Glanworth Mill ===
Glanworth mill, built in the late 18th century, is located along the banks of the River Funshion and sits below the Norman castle. Converted to a woollen mill in the 1840s as part of a famine relief scheme, it is home to one of the last remaining reverse undershot water wheels in Ireland.

It was first owned as a woollen mill by the Daly family, whose Rossmore Mills represented the Irish woollen industry with 12 firms at the Great Exhibition and whose legacy continued at the Ardfinnan Woollen Mills. It became a woollen mill again under their extended family Messrs John F Quinlan & Company of the Glanworth and Bluebell Woollen Mills and represented the Irish woollen industry with 28 other firms at the 1883 Cork International Exhibition.

== Transport ==
Glanworth railway station opened on 23 March 1891, closed for passenger and goods traffic on 27 January 1947 and finally closed altogether on 1 December 1953.

Because of its historical status as a town, it is at the convergence point of a number of minor roads.

== Sport ==
The village has men's and women's Gaelic Athletic Association teams with a tradition in Gaelic football. In November 2009, Glanworth GAA's intermediate football team won the Cork Junior A Football Championship for the third time in their history, beating Ballygarvan.

Glanworth is also home to the 105th Scout Group (Scouting Ireland), and two former association football (soccer) teams: Glanworth United and Glanworth Celtic. Glanworth United played in division 2A of the Cork AUL, but subsequently disbanded.

== Film ==
Several scenes from the 1999 Bob Hoskins film Felicia's Journey were shot on location in Glanworth.

== See also ==
- List of towns and villages in Ireland
- List of abbeys and priories in Ireland (County Cork)
- List of townlands in the barony of Condons and Clangibbon
