= Ballinatray =

Townlands in Gorey, County Wexford, Ireland

Coordinates: 52.64429°N 6.24198°W

Ballinatray Lower (Irish: Baile na Trá Íochtarach) and Ballintray Upper (Irish: Baile na Trá Uachtarach) are townlands in Gorey, County Wexford, Ireland. Other townlands in Ireland are called Ballinatray as well.
