= Condons and Clangibbon =

Barony in County Cork, Ireland

Condons and Clangibbon Condúnaigh agus Clann Ghiobúin (Irish)
- Barony
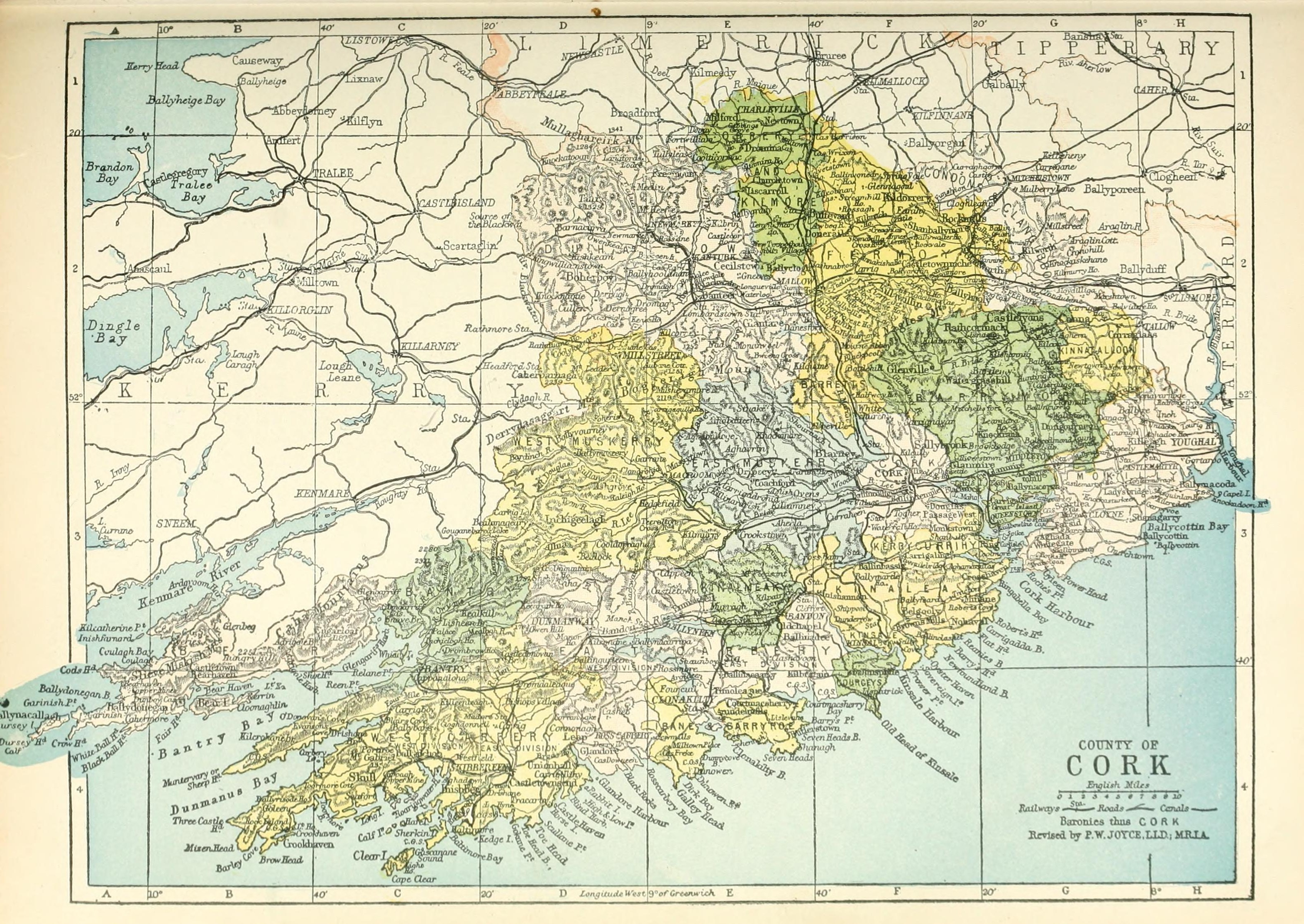
- Barony map of County Cork, 1900; Condons and Clangibbon barony is in the northeast, coloured peach.

- Location within County Cork
- Coordinates: 52°13′26″N 8°12′24″W
- Sovereign state: Ireland
- Province: Munster
- County: Cork

Area
  - Total: 315.3 km^{2} (121.7 sq mi)

Condons and Clangibbon (Irish: Condúnaigh agus Clann Ghiobúin) is a historical barony in County Cork, Ireland.

== Etymology ==
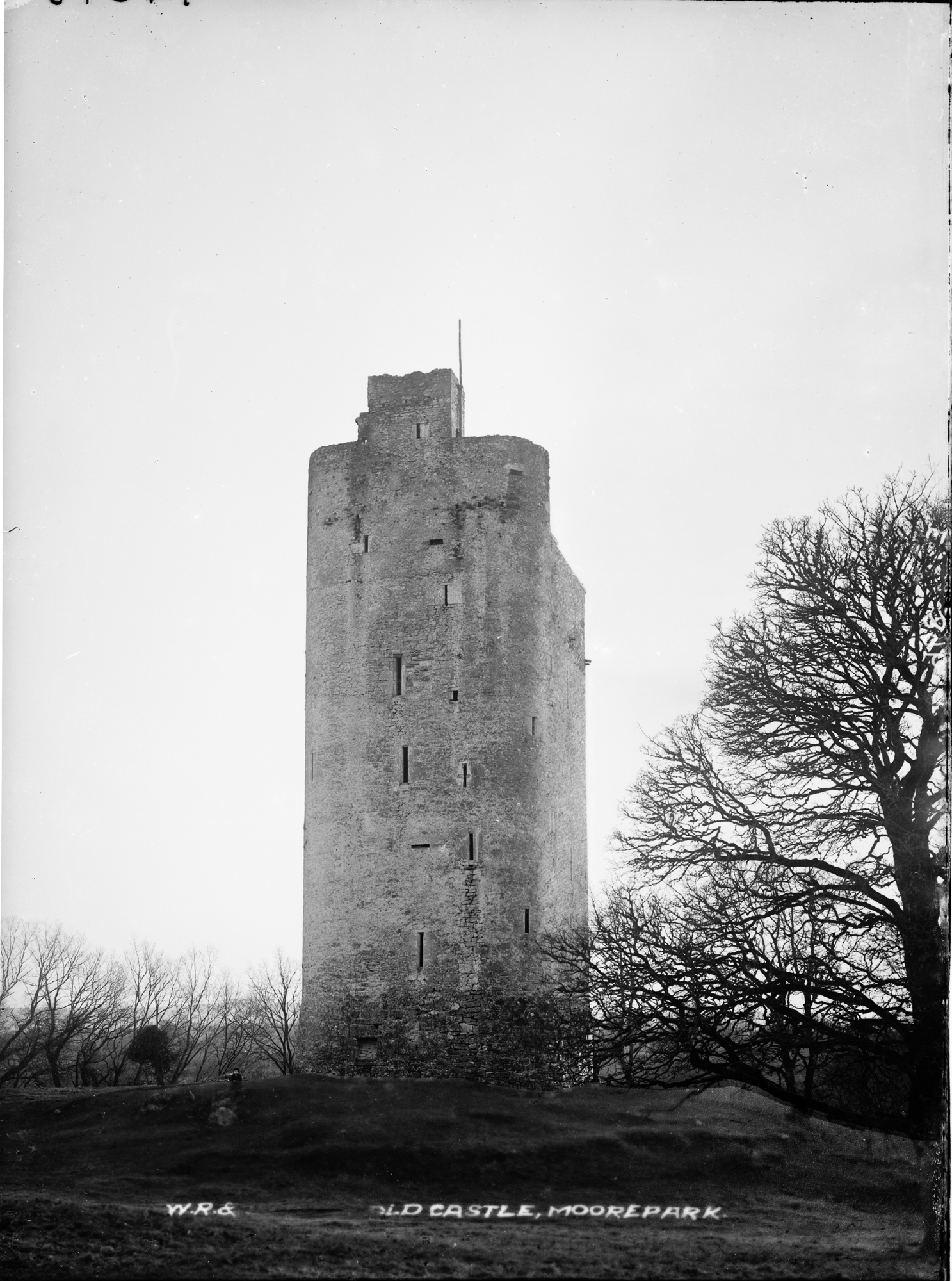
Cloghleigh Castle, seat of the Condons.

Condons and Clangibbon takes its name two ruling Norman-Irish families: Condons or Cauntons (Condún), and the FitzGibbons or White Knight.

== Geography ==
Condons and Clangibbon is located in the northeast of County Cork.

== History ==
The Condon territory was originally held by the O'Kiefs, before being conquered by the Norman Condons. Clangibbon was known as Ive-le-bane (Uibh Le Bán), "the white territory". Later much of the barony was owned by the Earls of Kingston.

== List of settlements ==
Settlements within the historical barony of Condons and Clangibbon include:

- Clondulane
- Fermoy
- Kildorrery
- Kilworth
- Mitchelstown

== See also ==
- List of townlands of the barony of Condons & Clangibbon
