= Munster Blackwater =

River in Ireland

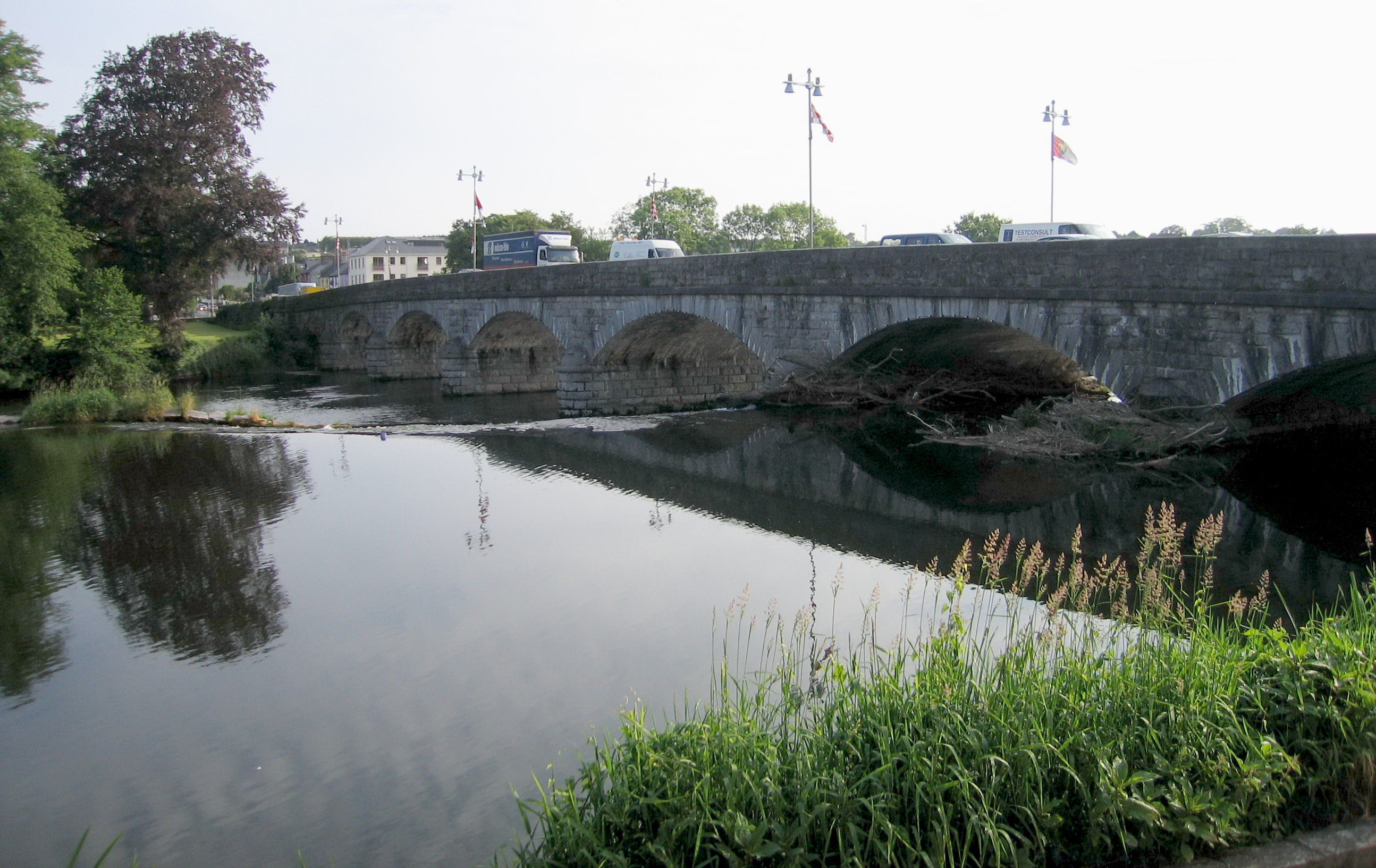
- The Blackwater at Fermoy
- Native name: An Abhainn Mhór (Irish); An Abha Mhór (Irish)

Location
- Country: Ireland
- Province: Munster
- Counties: Kerry, Cork, Waterford

Physical characteristics
- Source: Mullaghareirk Mountains
  - location: County Kerry
  - coordinates: 52.192°N 9.241°W
  - elevation: 229 m (751 ft)
- Mouth: Celtic Sea
  - location: Youghal Harbour, Cork
  - coordinates: 51.942°N 7.833°W
- Length: 169 km (105 mi)
- Basin size: 1,200 mi^{2} (3,100 km^{2})

Basin features
- Tributaries
  - left: Funshion or Funcheon, Araglin
  - right: Bride
- Designation

Ramsar Wetland
- Official name: Blackwater Estuary
- Designated: 7 June 1996
- Reference no.: 836

The Blackwater or Munster Blackwater (Irish: An Abhainn Mhór, The Great River) is a river which flows through counties Kerry, Cork and Waterford in Ireland. It rises in the Mullaghareirk Mountains in County Kerry and then flows in an easterly direction across County Cork through the towns of Mallow and Fermoy. It then enters County Waterford where it flows through Lismore, before abruptly turning south at Cappoquin and finally draining into the Celtic Sea at Youghal Harbour in Cork. In total, the Blackwater is 169 km (105 mi) long. The total catchment area of the River Blackwater is 3,324 km^{2}. Its long-term average flow rate of is 89.1 cubic metres per second (m^{3}/s).

The Blackwater is known for its salmon fishing. Like many Irish rivers, salmon stocks declined in recent years, but the Irish government banned commercial netting of salmon off the coast of Ireland in November 2006.

== Tributaries ==
Tributaries of the Blackwater include:

- River Awbeg (An Abha Bheag, "the small river")
- River Dalua (Abhainn Dalua)
- River Bride (An Bhríd)
- River Allow (Abhainn Ealla)
- River Araglin (An Airglinn)
- River Finnow (An Fhionnabha, "the fair river")
- River Funshion (Abhainn na Fuinseann, "the ash river")

== Settlements ==
Towns along the river are Youghal, Cappoquin, Lismore, Fermoy, Mallow and Rathmore.

== Special Protection Area ==
The Blackwater Estuary was listed on the Ramsar List of Wetlands of International Importance on 11 June 1996. It is also a Special Protection Area (SPA) under the E.U. Birds Directive, the SPA extends from Youghal New Bridge to the Ferry Point peninsula, near the outflow of the river to the sea. The SPA encompasses a section of the main channel of the River Blackwater as far as Ballynaclash Quay as well as the channel between Kinsalebeg and Moord Cross Roads on the eastern side and part of the estuary of the Tourig River as far upstream as Kilmagner. The tidal flats attract numbers of waders and wildfowl and the species named as targets for conservation within the SPA include an internationally important population of black-tailed godwit as well as nationally important populations of Eurasian wigeon, European golden plover, Northern lapwing, dunlin, bar-tailed godwit, Eurasian curlew and common redshank. Other notable species occurring within the SPA are pale-bellied brent goose, common shelduck, Eurasian teal, mallard, Northern shoveler, red-breasted merganser, great cormorant, little egret, grey heron, Eurasian oystercatcher, common ringed plover, grey plover, red knot, common greenshank and ruddy turnstone. Little egret, European golden plover and bar-tailed godwit are listed on Annex I of the E.U. Birds Directive.

== Fish kill ==
In August 2025, anglers on the river discovered what was described as the "largest fish kill in the history of the state", impacting approximately 32,000 salmon and brown trout in the river. Despite an investigation, a report stated that the source or pollutant responsible for the fish kill could not be identified, with tests finding no evidence of disease, chemicals, pesticides or heavy metals. Local anglers urged Inland Fisheries Ireland (IFI) to improve investigations, questioned the agency's delay in initiating them, and called for the removal of all commercial netting, as well as increased fines for facilities that discharge into the river.

In September 2025, Ella McSweeney of The Irish Times published a report into violations by North Cork Creameries, a farmer-owned co-operative based in Kanturk. The Environmental Protection Agency (EPA) had identified a number of violations by the creamery, which discharged into the River Allow, a tributary to the Blackwater. In response, North Cork Creameries said it was "entirely impossible" that it was responsible for the fish kill. That month, the EPA released the results of its investigation, which found no cause and suggested that there was no casual link between the activity of sites under its regulation and the fish kill.

Following the fish kill, local angling clubs installed their own water quality sensors and the secretary of the Killavullen Angling Club secretary criticised the multi-agency taskforce for failing to identify the pollutant or those responsible.
