= List of national monuments in County Cork =

The Irish state has officially approved the following list of national monuments in County Cork. In the Republic of Ireland, a structure or site may be deemed to be a "national monument", and therefore worthy of state protection, if it is of national importance. If the land adjoining the monument is essential to protect it, this land may also be protected.

== National Monuments ==
NM#	Monument name	Description	Image	Townland	Location
645	Altar Wedge Tomb	Wedge Tomb		Altar	51°30′49″N 9°38′38″W
314	Ardskeagh Church	Church		Ardskeagh (Fermoy barony)	52°19′55″N 8°37′41″W
301	Ballybeg	Dovecote		Ballybeg East	52°13′13″N 8°40′11″W
301	Ballybeg	Tower		Ballybeg West	52°13′12″N 8°40′07″W
301	Ballybeg Abbey	Friary (Augustinian)		Buttevant	52°13′10″N 8°40′11″W
22	Templekieran, Clear Island	Church & Cross inscribed pillar		Ballyieragh North	51°26′27″N 9°30′22″W
425	Ballinacarriga Castle	Castle		Dunmanway	51°42′20″N 9°01′54″W
641	Barryscourt Castle	Castle		Carrigtwohill	51°54′17″N 8°15′34″W
594	Blossomfort	Ringfort		Blossomfort	52°09′41″N 8°45′15″W
558	Glanworth	Medieval tower		Boherash	52°11′21″N 8°21′20″W
558	Glanworth Castle	Castle		Glanworth	52°11′17″N 8°21′17″W
558	Rock Abbey, Glanworth	Friary (Franciscan)		Boherash	52°11′21″N 8°21′22″W
450	Breeny More Stone Circle	Stone Circle & boulder burials		Breeny More	51°44′32″N 9°22′30″W
202	Buttevant Abbey	Friary (Franciscan)		Buttevant	52°13′52″N 8°40′09″W
233	Cahervagliar	Ringfort		Cappeen West	51°47′35″N 8°59′49″W
660	Carrigagulla	Stone Circle		Ballinagree	52°00′01″N 8°54′59″W
255	Carrigaphooca Castle	Castle		Carrigaphooca	51°54′31″N 9°01′42″W
255	Carrigaphooca stone circle	Stone Circle		Carrigaphooca	51°54′35″N 9°01′30″W
656	Castledonovan Castle	Castle		Castledonovan	51°41′32″N 9°16′57″W
281	Mallow Castle	Castle		Castlelands	52°08′02″N 8°38′22″W
536	Clodagh Standing Stones	Standing Stones - Pair		Clodagh, County Cork	51°41′53″N 9°13′27″W
240	Conna Castle	Castle		Conna	52°05′40″N 8°06′06″W
592	Carn Tierna	Hillfort & Cairn		Coolcarron (Fermoy)	52°06′54″N 8°16′58″W
565	Coolcoulaghta Standing Stones	Standing Stones - Pair		Coolcoulaghta	51°35′48″N 9°32′36″W
395	Coole Upper Churches	Two Churches		Coole Upper	52°06′31″N 8°12′12″W
600	Derryarkane Stone Circle	Stone Circle & Standing Stone		Derryarkane	51°43′43″N 9°22′19″W
296	Drishane Castle	Castle		Drishane More	52°04′31″N 9°02′55″W
339	Dromaneen Castle	Castle		Dromaneen	52°07′35″N 8°43′50″W
381	Drombeg	Circle, Hut Site & Fulacht Fiadh		Glandore	51°33′52″N 9°05′13″W
169	Sherkin Abbey	Friary (Franciscan)		Sherkin Island	51°28′34″N 9°24′01″W
374	Farranahineeny Stone Row	Stone Row		Farranahineeny	51°47′42″N 9°08′20″W
284	Knockdrum Stone Fort	Cashel		Farrandau	51°31′36″N 9°11′37″W
426	Ballycrovane Ogham Stone	Ogham Stone		Faunkill and the Woods	51°42′47″N 9°56′41″W
535	Charles Fort	Star-Shaped-Fort		Summer Cove	51°41′47″N 8°29′56″W
552	Greenhill Ogham Stones	Ogham Stones		Greenhill	52°04′40″N 8°36′25″W
502	Island Wedge Tomb	Wedge Tomb		Island (Rahan)	52°04′04″N 8°34′47″W
490	Kilbolane Castle	Castle		Milford	52°20′20″N 8°51′04″W
182	Kilcrea Abbey	Friary (Franciscan)		Ovens	51°51′54″N 8°42′41″W
316	Kileenemer Church	Church		Killeenemer	52°12′56″N 8°19′43″W
436	Kilnaruane Carved Pillar Stone	Shaft of High Cross		Kilnaruane	51°40′17″N 9°28′05″W
420	Knocknakilla	Stone Circle		Macroom and Millstreet	52°00′22″N 9°01′25″W
318	Labbacallee wedge tomb	Wedge Tomb		Labbacallee	52°10′27″N 8°20′04″W
18	Labbamolaga Church	Church & Grave slabs		Labbamolaga Middle	52°18′39″N 8°20′51″W
333	Liscarroll Castle	Castle		Liscarroll	52°15′40″N 8°48′12″W
571	Lissacresig Stone Circle	Stone Circle		Lissacresig	51°55′32″N 9°03′43″W
571	Lissacresig Ringfort	Ringfort		Lissacresig	51°55′28″N 9°03′21″W
	Maughanasilly Stone Row	Stone Row		Maughanasilly	51°46′14″N 9°23′11″W
411	Castlelyons Friary	Friary (Carmelite)		Mohera	52°05′21″N 8°14′01″W
525	James Fort	Star-Shaped-Fort & Blockhouse		Castlepark	51°41′55″N 8°30′44″W
517	Kanturk Castle	Castle		Kanturk	52°09′53″N 8°54′10″W
580	Skeagh Cairn	Ring barrow & Cairn		Skeagh (Abbeystrowry)	51°34′29″N 9°20′18″W
	Mount Gabriel	Prehistoric copper mines		Mount Gabriel	51°33′07″N 9°31′51″W
618	Kinneigh Round Tower	Round Tower		Castletown-Kinneigh	51°45′50″N 8°58′31″W
21	Timoleague Abbey	Friary (Franciscan)		Timoleague	51°38′35″N 8°45′49″W
360	Desmond Castle or The French Prison, Kinsale	Tower House		Kinsale	51°42′26″N 8°31′29″W
299	Tullylease Church	Church & Grave Slabs		Tullylease	52°19′00″N 8°56′23″W
634	Michael Collins birth place	Site with historic associations		Woodfield (Kilkerranmore)	51°37′00″N 8°58′50″W
286	North Abbey, Youghal	Friary (Dominican)		Youghal	51°57′27″N 7°51′16″W

== Sources ==
- "National Monuments in County Cork" (PDF). Archived from the original (PDF) on 1 December 2024.
