= List of hillforts in Ireland =

The landscape of Ireland is dotted with many hillforts. These are classically defined as small hilltop settlements fortified with earthworks, but many are not located on hills, and probably did not function as forts. Their function is unclear; although conventionally interpreted as defensive fortifications and centres of economic political power, there is little evidence that they were ever attacked, and more recent scholarship has suggested that they may be better interpreted as monuments. Many of Ireland's hillforts are promontory forts on the coasts.

== County Carlow ==
- Ballinkillin (52.65302°N 6.9333°W), contour fort
- Killoughterane (52.62751°N 6.85683°W), contour fort

== County Cavan ==
- Ardamagh (54.06293°N 7.29064°W), partial contour fort
- Ballyhugh (54.08306°N 7.54496°W), promontory fort
- Derryragh (54.07751°N 7.66714°W), contour fort
- Drumacleeskin (54.09347°N 7.256°W), contour fort
- Garrysallagh (D'Arcy) (53.81458°N 7.27858°W), promontory fort
- Glasleck (53.97846°N 6.92191°W), promontory fort
- Magherintemple (54.09478°N 7.2205°W), contour fort
- Mullagh (53.81645°N 6.97077°W), promontory fort

== County Clare ==
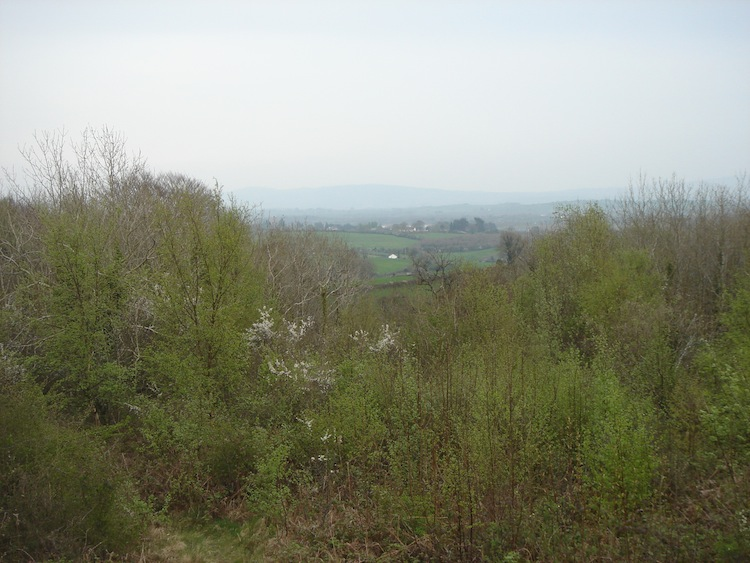
Mooghaun

- Anneville (52.95426°N 9.07955°W), promontory fort
- Ardcarney (52.8946°N 8.99451°W), contour fort
- Ballard (52.72677°N 9.631°W), promontory fort
- Ballard (52.73193°N 9.62688°W), promontory fort
- Ballybreen (52.97807°N 9.23511°W), contour fort
- Ballyherragh (52.93198°N 9.46146°W), promontory fort
- Ballyhickey (52.83744°N 8.85862°W), level terrain fort
- Ballylan (52.94832°N 9.46823°W), promontory fort
- Ballynahinch (52.88123°N 8.66099°W), contour fort
- Ballyneillan (52.86236°N 9.03784°W), contour fort
- Ballysheen More (52.76093°N 8.78006°W), hillslope fort
- Breaffy South (52.84996°N 9.45035°W), promontory fort
- Cahercalla (52.83643°N 8.83159°W), multiple enclosure hillfort
- Caherhurley (52.88064°N 8.56779°W), contour fort
- Caherrush (52.83305°N 9.45372°W), promontory fort
- Cappanakilla (52.89572°N 9.04829°W), multiple enclosure hillfort
- Carrownakilly (52.76661°N 8.87526°W), level terrain fort
- Castlecrine (52.75588°N 8.75044°W), hillslope fort
- Clenagh (52.73002°N 8.94778°W), contour fort
- Cloghaunsavaun (52.5968°N 9.83818°W), promontory fort
- Clonmoney West (52.71685°N 8.8408°W), level terrain fort
- Cloonmunnia (52.77212°N 8.79496°W), level terrain fort
- Corbally (52.70516°N 9.6482°W), promontory fort
- Corbally (52.69241°N 9.65682°W), promontory fort
- Crag (52.92804°N 9.34815°W), promontory fort
- Emlagh (52.82339°N 9.45583°W), promontory fort
- Enagh East (52.78873°N 8.74455°W), contour fort
- Farrihy (52.71918°N 9.61945°W), promontory fort
- Fintra Beg (52.8689°N 9.43929°W), promontory fort
- Foohagh (52.67073°N 9.69574°W), promontory fort
- Foymoyle Beg (52.79105°N 8.58725°W), multiple enclosure hillfort
- Freaghcastle (52.87623°N 9.43663°W), promontory fort
- Glennageer (52.84683°N 9.24247°W), hillslope fort
- Keelderry (52.85568°N 8.63967°W), contour fort
- Kilbaha North (52.5652°N 9.921°W), promontory fort
- Kilbaha South (52.56085°N 9.93688°W), promontory fort
- Kilbaha South (52.55805°N 9.90818°W), promontory fort
- Kilbaha South (52.55817°N 9.91273°W), promontory fort
- Kilbaha South (Horse Island) (52.55557°N 9.89002°W), promontory fort
- Kilcloher (52.56698°N 9.81826°W), promontory fort
- Kildrum (52.8087°N 8.85038°W), contour fort
- Killard (52.74732°N 9.55005°W), promontory fort
- Knockadoon (52.85883°N 8.74524°W), contour fort
- Lislorkan North (52.97308°N 9.43092°W), promontory fort
- Mooghaun (52.782883°N 8.878402°W), multiple enclosure hillfort
- Moveen East (52.66626°N 9.69794°W), promontory fort
- Moveen West (52.65741°N 9.72098°W), promontory fort
- Mutton Island (52.80789°N 9.53122°W), promontory fort
- Mutton Island (52.8121°N 9.51304°W), promontory fort
- Quilty (52.60326°N 9.8123°W), hillfort
- Rathclooney (52.89317°N 8.87303°W), contour fort
- Tullagh Lower 1 (52.98391°N 9.19698°W), contour fort
- Tullagh Lower 2 (52.98687°N 9.19337°W), hillslope fort
- Tullig (52.61047°N 9.80441°W), promontory fort

== County Cork ==
- Allihies (51.64829°N 10.05654°W), promontory fort
- Ardaturrish More (51.71894°N 9.4917°W), promontory fort
- Baile Iarthach Thuaidh (Ballyieragh North) (51.42573°N 9.52038°W), promontory fort
- Ballycotten (52.96108°N 9.39171°W), contour fort
- Ballydivlin (51.50107°N 9.68276°W), promontory fort
- Ballyieragh North (Clear Island) (51.43839°N 9.51481°W), promontory fort
- Ballymackean (51.62784°N 8.52985°W), promontory fort
- Ballynacarriga (51.5893°N 10.15265°W), promontory fort
- Ballyrobin South (51.80912°N 8.09573°W), promontory fort
- Ballytransna (51.82013°N 8.03048°W), promontory fort
- Billeragh (51.61455°N 10.13064°W), promontory fort
- Caherdrinny (52.22191°N 8.29752°W), contour fort
- Calf Island East (51.48462°N 9.4922°W), promontory fort
- Canalough (51.58967°N 10.03813°W), promontory fort
- Carn Tighernagh (52.11498°N 8.2829°W), multiple enclosure hillfort
- Carrigillihy (51.54036°N 9.1114°W), promontory fort
- Castlepoint (51.49205°N 9.63061°W), promontory fort
- Castlewideham (52.17052°N 8.46096°W), promontory fort
- Claragh (52.04923°N 9.09385°W), contour fort
- Clashanimud (51.80273°N 8.69324°W), multiple enclosure hillfort
- Cloddagh (Sherkin Island) (51.47485°N 9.43217°W), promontory fort
- Cloghfune (51.62029°N 10.07954°W), promontory fort
- Cloghfune (51.62102°N 10.08183°W), promontory fort
- Cloonaghlin West (Bear Island) (51.62813°N 9.82048°W), promontory fort
- Coolcoulaghta (51.60663°N 9.54161°W), promontory fort
- Courtmacsherry (51.62684°N 8.68921°W), promontory fort
- Curragh (51.93965°N 8.23103°W), level terrain fort
- Derrycreeveen (Bear Island) (51.62147°N 9.91858°W), promontory fort
- Derryvreeveen (Bere Island) (51.61545°N 9.90826°W), promontory fort
- Donaghmore (51.58894°N 8.79012°W), promontory fort
- Donneendermotmore (51.48198°N 9.23255°W), promontory fort
- Donoure (51.54389°N 8.95647°W), promontory fort
- Dooneen (51.5681°N 9.72649°W), promontory fort
- Dooneenmacotter (51.81905°N 8.03742°W), promontory fort
- Downeen (51.55996°N 9.02463°W), promontory fort
- Downmacpatrick (Old Head) (51.61049°N 8.53678°W), promontory fort
- Drombrow (51.70605°N 9.40582°W), promontory fort
- Dromclogh (51.66529°N 9.50857°W), promontory fort
- Dunbeacon (51.5981°N 9.5803°W), promontory fort
- Dunbogey (51.7017°N 8.393°W), promontory fort
- Dundeady (51.5319°N 8.9534°W), promontory fort
- Dunlough (51.48247°N 9.82977°W), promontory fort
- Dunnycove (51.55898°N 8.89149°W), promontory fort
- Dunowen (51.54027°N 8.91806°W), promontory fort
- Dunworly (51.57071°N 8.74965°W), promontory fort
- Dunworly (51.58381°N 8.75219°W), promontory fort
- Farranacoush (51.4786°N 9.40029°W), promontory fort
- Garranes (51.61207°N 9.98399°W), promontory fort
- Glenphuca (51.97149°N 8.07599°W), contour fort
- Gortacrossig (51.48747°N 9.21048°W), promontory fort
- Gouladoo (51.61749°N 9.68268°W), promontory fort
- Greenane (Bear Island) (51.61304°N 9.88509°W), promontory fort
- Greenville (51.8336°N 8.95699°W), contour fort
- Kilcatherine (51.73537°N 9.97389°W), promontory fort
- Killeagh (51.70397°N 8.4148°W), promontory fort
- Killoveenoge (51.65205°N 9.57221°W), promontory fort
- Kinure (51.68821°N 8.42895°W), promontory fort
- Knockdrum Stone Fort (51.5265°N 9.1937°E)
- Knockadoon (Warren) (51.87049°N 7.94839°W), promontory fort
- Lackavaun (51.52629°N 9.73279°W), promontory fort
- Lahard (51.78679°N 8.16292°W), promontory fort
- Lissamona/Lios Ó Móine (Clear Island) (51.44674°N 9.49363°W), promontory fort
- Lissamona/Lios Ó Móine (Clear Island) (51.44473°N 9.49729°W), promontory fort
- Loughane Beg (51.59376°N 10.05284°W), promontory fort
- Moyross (51.52269°N 9.14341°W), promontory fort
- Oldcourt (52.22277°N 8.59235°W), promontory fort
- Portadoona (51.50093°N 9.212°W), promontory fort
- Rath (51.98154°N 7.96484°W), multiple enclosure hillfort
- Reen (51.51647°N 9.17479°W), promontory fort
- Reenadisert (51.71576°N 9.45926°W), promontory fort
- Reenogrena (51.54824°N 9.07403°W), promontory fort
- Rochestown (51.63641°N 8.62469°W), promontory fort
- Slievemore (Sherkin Island) (51.46275°N 9.43786°W), promontory fort

== County Donegal ==
- An Bhraid Íochtarach (54.70513°N 8.677°W), promontory fort
- An Machaire (54.91838°N 8.42611°W), promontory fort
- Balleeghan Lower (55.30125°N 7.19833°W), contour fort
- Ballygorman (55.36829°N 7.31135°W), promontory fort
- Ballygorman (55.36648°N 7.29041°W), promontory fort
- Ballynakilly (Inch Island) (55.05764°N 7.51473°W), promontory fort
- Ballynarry (55.15176°N 7.47667°W), contour fort
- Carrowmore (55.1667°N 7.23905°W), contour fort
- Carthage (55.30297°N 7.15479°W), promontory fort
- Carthage (55.3168°N 7.1685°W), promontory fort
- Carthage (55.30605°N 7.1596°W), promontory fort
- Crislaghmore (55.07024°N 7.41696°W), contour fort
- Croaghross (55.21754°N 7.60639°W), promontory fort
- Culoort (55.33215°N 7.35183°W), promontory fort
- Derrylahan (Doire Leathan) (54.62887°N 8.62751°W), promontory fort
- Doon (55.02643°N 7.82097°W), promontory fort
- Doonalt (Dún Alt) (54.70817°N 8.76125°W), promontory fort
- Drumacrin (54.48039°N 8.28164°W), promontory fort
- Drumnasillagh (54.79251°N 8.26609°W), contour fort
- Errarooey More (Oirear Dhumhaí Mór) (55.16585°N 8.06268°W), promontory fort
- Glasbolie (54.55316°N 8.15725°W), contour fort
- Glengad (55.3283°N 7.16938°W), promontory fort
- Gort an Choirce (55.11965°N 8.13232°W), promontory fort
- Gortnatraw North (Gort Na Trá) (55.23713°N 7.75881°W), promontory fort
- Grianán of Aileach (55.02382°N 7.42766°W), multiple enclosure hillfort
- Illion (54.97248°N 8.50187°W), promontory fort
- Inishdooey (Oileán Dúiche) (55.18762°N 8.16185°W), promontory fort
- IR4350 Ballygorman (55.36881°N 7.31765°W), promontory fort
- Knockfola (Cnoc Fola) (55.1503°N 8.2966°W), promontory fort
- Largysillagh (54.62661°N 8.51306°W), promontory fort
- Linsfort (55.17128°N 7.50762°W), promontory fort
- Maglin Beg (Málainn Bhig) (54.66156°N 8.77941°W), promontory fort
- Muckross (54.60892°N 8.59217°W), promontory fort
- Muntermellan (55.21392°N 7.94361°W), promontory fort
- Parkmore (55.18936°N 7.90261°W), promontory fort
- Redford Glebe (55.29004°N 7.12054°W), contour fort
- Reneely (54.60199°N 8.29729°W), promontory fort
- Tory Island (55.26002°N 8.19422°W), promontory fort
- Townparks (54.50275°N 8.20234°W), promontory fort
- Tullynavinn (55.17029°N 7.1403°W), promontory fort

== County Dublin ==
- Athgoe (53.28726°N 6.51255°W), contour fort
- Dalkey Island (53.27355°N 6.08666°W), promontory fort
- Drumanagh (53.54038°N 6.08029°W), promontory fort
- Garristown (53.56358°N 6.39341°W), contour fort
- Howth (53.36498°N 6.05573°W), promontory fort
- Howth (53.37554°N 6.07662°W), contour fort
- Knockbrack (53.57204°N 6.25808°W), contour fort
- Lambay Island (53.4966°N 6.02344°W), promontory fort
- Lambay Island (53.4977°N 6.0275°W), promontory fort
- Rathmicheal (53.22873°N 6.15232°W), contour fort

== County Galway ==
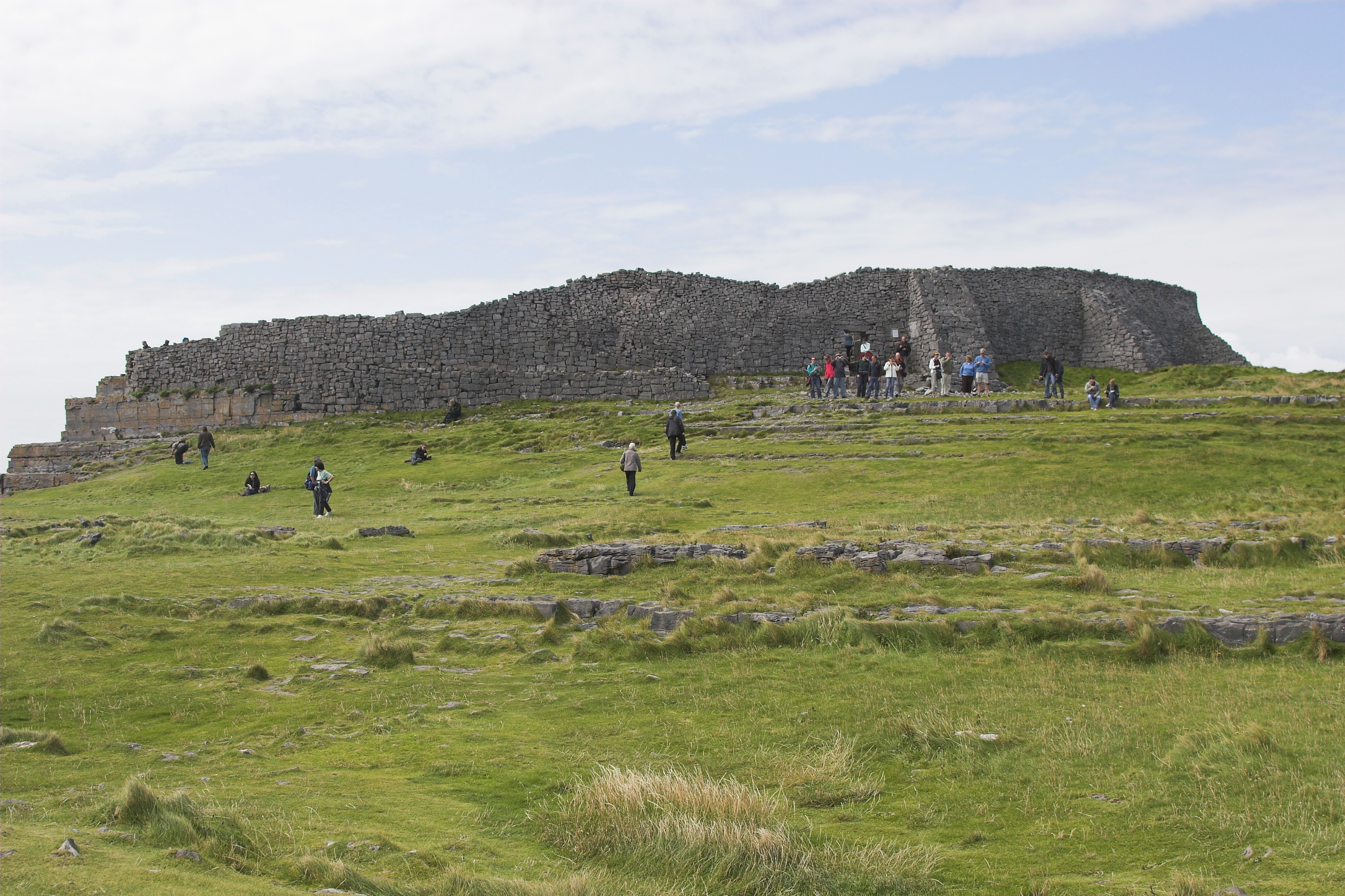
Dun Aengus

- Belmont (53.61635°N 8.97484°W), contour fort
- Carrownderry (53.68207°N 8.57343°W), partial contour fort
- Cloonamore (Cluana Mór) (53.63448°N 10.19426°W), promontory fort
- Clooncah (53.6454°N 8.39135°W), contour fort
- Curragh (An Curragh) (53.60303°N 10.04988°W), promontory fort
- Dun Aengus (53.12591°N 9.76636°W), promontory fort
- Earlspark (53.17213°N 8.54161°W), contour fort
- Fahy (An Fhaiche) (53.49939°N 10.11178°W), promontory fort
- Fawnmore (An Fán Mór) (53.62588°N 10.23111°W), promontory fort
- Grannagh (53.14858°N 8.75326°W), contour fort
- High Island (Ardoileán) (53.54746°N 10.24795°W), promontory fort
- Inishark (Inis Airc) (53.60868°N 10.28959°W), promontory fort
- Inishshark (53.60816°N 10.26289°W), promontory fort
- Killeany (Cill Éinne) (53.10446°N 9.68773°W), promontory fort
- Kilskeagh (53.36738°N 8.77894°W), multiple enclosure hillfort
- Knockacarrigeen (53.48577°N 8.93718°W), partial contour fort
- Knocknacarragh (53.25496°N 9.11166°W), contour fort
- Liathleitir (53.33418°N 9.22916°W), hillfort
- Moanbaun (53.31335°N 8.79832°W), contour fort
- Mullaghglass (53.59721°N 9.93221°W), promontory fort
- Rahally (53.28232°N 8.51038°W), multiple enclosure hillfort
- Westquarter (An Cheathrú Iartharach) (53.61951°N 10.25669°W), promontory fort

== County Kerry ==
- Alaghee/Alachaí Mór (51.816°N 10.33782°W), promontory fort
- Ballybunion (52.51198°N 9.67739°W), promontory fort
- Ballyickeen Commons (Coimín Bhaile Ícín) (52.12492°N 10.46267°W), promontory fort
- Ballymacadoyle (Baile Mhic and Daill) (52.11322°N 10.28515°W), promontory fort
- Ballymore West (Baile Móir Thiar) (52.12493°N 10.33765°W), promontory fort
- Ballymore West (Baile Móir Thiar) (52.1215°N 10.33599°W), promontory fort
- Ballynahow (Baile na habha) (52.23919°N 10.30884°W), promontory fort
- Ballyoughteragh South (Baile Uachtarach Thiar) (52.17359°N 10.45686°W), promontory fort
- Barrow (52.30247°N 9.86877°W), promontory fort
- Beal Middle (52.56842°N 9.64958°W), promontory fort
- Bromore West (52.53679°N 9.67158°W), promontory fort
- Caherconree (52.19737°N 9.86301°W), promontory fort
- Clashmelcon (52.46848°N 9.74388°W), promontory fort
- Clashmelcon (52.46653°N 9.74479°W), promontory fort
- Cloghanecanuig (Clochán Ceannúigh) (51.84458°N 10.3483°W), promontory fort
- Coarha Beg (51.88998°N 10.39092°W), promontory fort
- Cool East (An Chúil Thoir) (51.91442°N 10.37863°W), promontory fort
- Cool West (An Chúil Thiar) (51.91344°N 10.38423°W), promontory fort
- Coumeenoole North/Com Dhíneol Thuaidh (52.11129°N 10.46975°W), promontory fort
- Doon East (52.52961°N 9.67694°W), promontory fort
- Doon West (52.52077°N 9.67897°W), promontory fort
- Doon West (52.51758°N 9.67919°W), promontory fort
- Doonmanagh (Dún Meánach) (52.11928°N 10.14763°W), promontory fort
- Doonsheane (Dún Sián) (52.11882°N 10.22185°W), promontory fort
- Doonties Commons (Coimín nDúnta) (52.10938°N 10.19629°W), promontory fort
- Emlagh (An tImleach) (51.96656°N 10.2704°W), promontory fort
- Faha (52.23788°N 10.2405°W), promontory fort
- Fahan/Fán (Dún Beg) (52.10353°N 10.40889°W), promontory fort
- Foilnageragh (Faill na gCaoireach) (51.86503°N 10.38793°W), promontory fort
- Glanbane (52.21778°N 9.57635°W), multiple enclosure hillfort
- Kilfarnoge (Cill Fearnóg) (52.10792°N 10.37171°W), promontory fort
- Knockanacuig (52.27088°N 9.72976°W), contour fort
- Knockglass More (An Cnoc Glas Mór) (52.22834°N 9.90146°W), promontory fort
- Meenogahane (52.45005°N 9.7674°W), promontory fort
- Meenogahane (52.44834°N 9.78078°W), promontory fort
- Minard West (Minn Aird Thiar) (52.11293°N 10.1407°W), promontory fort
- Minard West (Minn Aird Thiar) (52.11372°N 10.14627°W), promontory fort
- Murirrigane (Muragrán) (52.28002°N 10.15968°W), promontory fort
- Paddock (52.11449°N 10.32358°W), promontory fort
- Reencaheragh (Rinn Chathrach) (51.87709°N 10.39433°W), promontory fort
- Reencaheragh (Rinn Chathrach) (51.87757°N 10.39766°W), promontory fort
- Tiduff (An Tigh Duibh) (52.41912°N 9.9441°W), promontory fort
- Tiduff (An Tigh Duibh) (52.41156°N 9.94678°W), promontory fort

== County Kildare ==
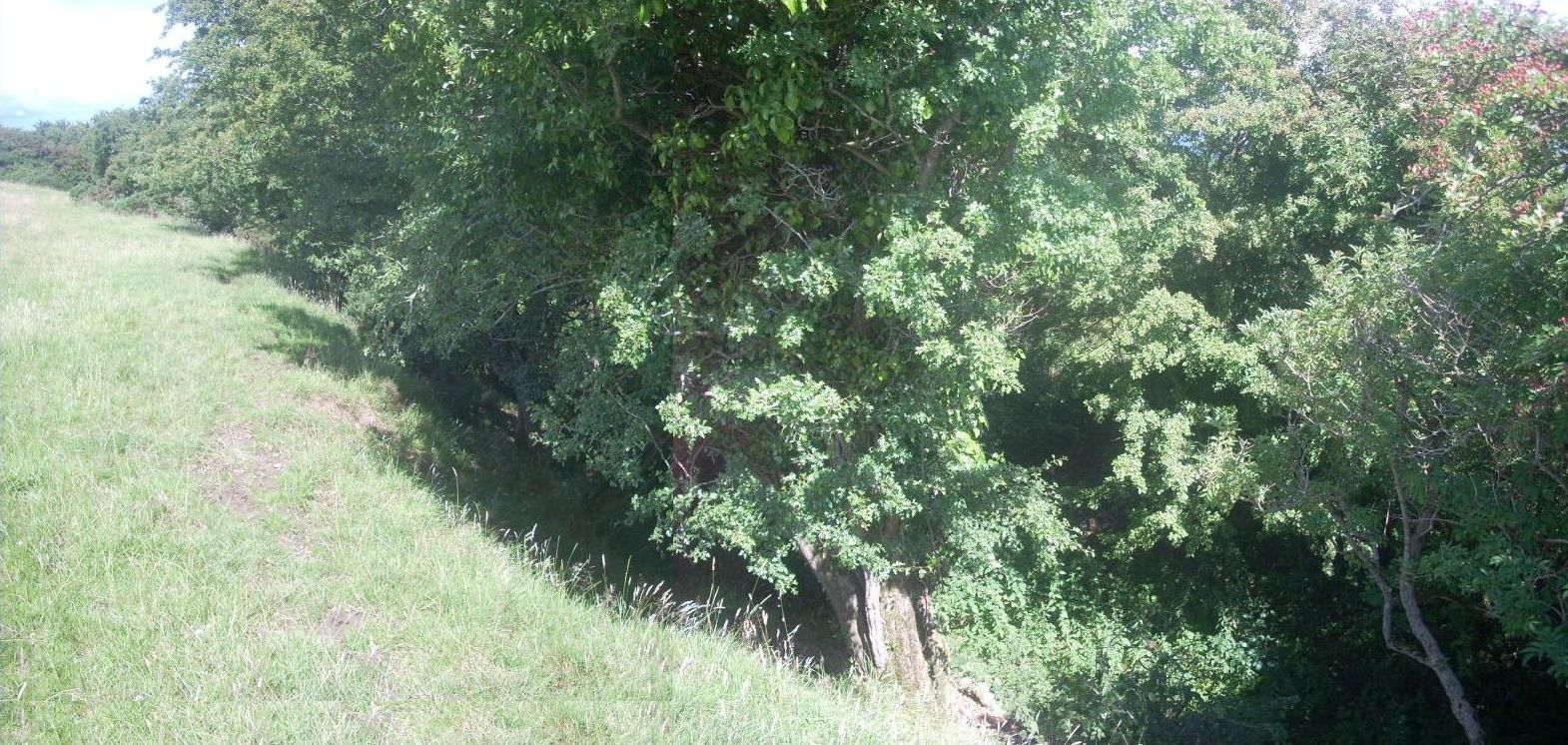
Dún Ailinne, County Kildare

- Brewel West (53.05586°N 6.75872°W), contour fort
- Dún Ailinne (53.10730°N 6.77543°W)
- Dunmurry West (53.1979°N 6.93137°W), partial contour fort
- Hughstown (52.94455°N 6.75°W), contour fort
- Kill Hill (53.24759°N 6.57669°W), multiple enclosure hillfort

== County Kilkenny ==
- Brandon Hill (52.50402°N 6.97263°W), hillslope fort
- Clonmantagh (52.73984°N 7.50817°W), level terrain fort
- Freestone Hill (52.6541°N 7.13052°W), partial contour fort
- Toor More (52.78793°N 7.29501°W), multiple enclosure hillfort

== County Laois ==
- Boley (52.9239°N 7.08677°W), contour fort
- Capard (53.12149°N 7.43331°W), contour fort
- Clopook (52.96467°N 7.13143°W), contour fort

== County Leitrim ==
- Ballinwing (53.99956°N 8.02515°W), promontory fort
- Boeeshil (54.05581°N 7.75033°W), contour fort
- Fawnlion (54.28317°N 8.31836°W), promontory fort
- Sheemore (53.99265°N 8.01492°W), contour fort
- The Doons (54.28855°N 8.32496°W), multiple enclosure hillfort
- Woodford Demesne (54.06051°N 7.686°W), promontory fort

== County Limerick ==
- Ballycahill (52.45992°N 8.45401°W), promontory fort
- Ballylin (52.50203°N 9.09365°W), multiple enclosure hillfort
- Castle Gale (52.29502°N 8.40904°W), promontory fort
- Dunglara (52.38795°N 8.39785°W), hillslope fort
- Friarstown 1 (52.59321°N 8.61675°W), contour fort
- Friarstown 2 (52.59358°N 8.61375°W), contour fort
- Knocknasnaa (52.41077°N 9.29779°W), multiple enclosure hillfort
- Knockroe (52.57944°N 8.50554°W), contour fort
- Knocksouna (52.40154°N 8.63918°W), multiple enclosure hillfort
- Lisbane (52.54391°N 9.04928°W), multiple enclosure hillfort
- Rathcannon (52.4563°N 8.60822°W), multiple enclosure hillfort
- Tory Hill (52.53524°N 8.69026°W), contour fort

== County Longford ==
- Granard (53.77493°N 7.50054°W), contour fort

== County Louth ==
- Ballinteskin (54.07046°N 6.24941°W), promontory fort
- Kane (54.03999°N 6.47951°W), promontory fort
- Knockagh (54.03553°N 6.48258°W), promontory fort
- Mountbagnall (53.98661°N 6.22335°W), promontory fort
- Slieve (54.03623°N 6.49522°W), promontory fort

== County Mayo ==
- Achadh Ghlaisín (54.27914°N 9.96378°W), promontory fort
- Achill Beg (53.86665°N 9.96427°W), promontory fort
- Achill Beg (53.87204°N 9.96497°W), promontory fort
- Achill Beg Island (53.87259°N 9.96485°W), promontory fort
- Aghadoon (Achadh Dúin) (54.28316°N 10.02821°W), promontory fort
- Aghaglasheen (Achadh Ghlaisín) (54.26833°N 9.9404°W), promontory fort
- Aghaglasheen (Achadh Ghlaisín) (54.27171°N 9.95468°W), promontory fort
- Annagh (An tEanach) (54.23057°N 10.07311°W), promontory fort
- Annagh (An tEanach) (54.23033°N 10.07167°W), promontory fort
- Annagh (An tEannach) (54.2412°N 10.10401°W), promontory fort
- Aughernagailliagh (Eoghair na gCaille) (54.26908°N 10.08044°W), promontory fort
- Aughernagalliagh (Eochair na gCailleach) (54.28007°N 10.05021°W), promontory fort
- Ballybroony (54.16059°N 9.25047°W), contour fort
- Four at Ballyglass (An Baile Glas) (54.26127°N 9.90742°W), promontory fort (54.2646°N 9.88947°W), promontory fort (54.26631°N 9.88945°W), promontory fort (54.262°N 9.91147°W), promontory fort
- Ballyheer (Inishturk) (53.69435°N 10.1127°W), promontory fort
- Ballymartin (53.58778°N 9.15714°W), level terrain fort
- Two at Ballytoothy More (Clare Island) (53.82468°N 9.97407°W), promontory fort (53.82497°N 9.97485°W), promontory fort
- Four at Béal Deirg Mór (54.30953°N 9.51976°W), promontory fort (54.31078°N 9.52624°W), promontory fort (54.30984°N 9.51628°W), promontory fort (54.31202°N 9.53348°W), promontory fort
- Brodullagh South (53.50745°N 9.12506°W), multiple enclosure hillfort
- Carrowgarve (An Cheathrú Gharbh) (53.87493°N 9.96665°W), promontory fort
- Carrownaglogh (Ceathrú na gCloch) (54.33647°N 9.81836°W), promontory fort
- Castlecarra (53.72318°N 9.26638°W), promontory fort
- Ceathrú na gCloch (54.34317°N 9.78674°W), promontory fort
- Two at Cill Ghallagáin (54.30298°N 9.85868°W), contour fort (54.30308°N 9.85478°W), promontory fort
- Claggan (Achill Island) (53.88367°N 9.97742°W), promontory fort
- Cloghans (54.06146°N 9.21955°W), promontory fort
- Conach Réidh (54.31841°N 9.50101°W), promontory fort
- Three at Dooega (Dumha Éige-Achill Island) (53.91991°N 10.0304°W), promontory fort (53.89549°N 9.99875°W), promontory fort (53.91577°N 10.04929°W), promontory fort
- Doogort East (Achill Island) (54.0151°N 10.01066°W), promontory fort
- Doogort East (Achill Island) (54.01502°N 10.00944°W), promontory fort
- Dooncarton (54.28051°N 9.83916°W), promontory fort
- Doontrusk (53.91248°N 9.57465°W), promontory fort
- Doorgort East (Achill Island) (54.01598°N 10.00152°W), promontory fort
- Duncarton (54.27855°N 9.84462°W), promontory fort
- Duvillaun More (54.07091°N 10.1736°W), promontory fort
- Errew (54.05361°N 9.26285°W), promontory fort
- Two at Gladree (An Gileadraigh) (54.26067°N 10.07627°W), promontory fort (54.26098°N 10.0764°W), promontory fort
- Gleann Lasra (54.3104°N 9.51277°W), promontory fort
- Gleannlasra (54.31147°N 9.50795°W), promontory fort
- Glen (Clare Island) (53.79553°N 9.95868°W), promontory fort
- Glenlara (Gleann Lára) (54.29505°N 10.00661°W), promontory fort
- Gortbrack (54.28665°N 10.02587°W), promontory fort
- Horse Island (54.32174°N 9.5631°W), promontory fort
- Iniskea South (54.11124°N 10.2306°W), promontory fort
- Kilgalligan (Cill Ghallagáin) (54.31865°N 9.8582°W), promontory fort
- Kinnadoohy (53.68572°N 9.91528°W), promontory fort
- Two at Knockaun (54.32733°N 9.34536°W), promontory fort (54.32784°N 9.34833°W), promontory fort
- Knocknalina (Cnocán na Líne) (54.25443°N 9.89091°W), promontory fort
- Laghtmurragha (Leacht Mhurchaidh) (54.32444°N 9.62579°W), promontory fort
- Lecarrow (Clare Island) (53.81245°N 9.95691°W), promontory fort
- Letter Beg (Leitir Beag) (54.10813°N 10.13217°W), promontory fort
- Pig Island (54.33272°N 9.72004°W), promontory fort
- Pollacappul (Poll an Chapaill) (54.27036°N 9.92277°W), promontory fort
- Port Durlainne (54.32729°N 9.73353°W), promontory fort
- Srahataggle (Sraith an tSeagail) (54.31792°N 9.66425°W), promontory fort
- Strake (Clare Island) (53.79153°N 10.02019°W), promontory fort
- Strake (Clare Island) (53.79054°N 9.99172°W), promontory fort
- Two at Termoncarragh (Tearmann Caithreach) (54.24793°N 10.08838°W), promontory fort (54.25063°N 10.08285°W), promontory fort
- Treanbeg (53.93399°N 9.57093°W), promontory fort
- Uggool (53.6343°N 9.88108°W), promontory fort

== County Meath ==
- Carrickspringan (53.81304°N 6.88097°W), promontory fort
- Commons of Lloyds (53.73319°N 6.90507°W), multiple enclosure hillfort
- Kilriffin (53.8508°N 6.6757°W), contour fort
- Knowth (53.69657°N 6.49336°W), promontory fort
- Mountfortesque (53.76111°N 6.57747°W), partial contour fort
- Ringlestown (53.5648°N 6.64282°W), contour fort

== County Monaghan ==
- Raferagh (53.97964°N 6.85413°W), contour fort

== County Offaly ==
- Ballycurragh (53.03243°N 7.78864°W), multiple enclosure hillfort
- Ballykilleen (53.30669°N 7.0954°W), contour fort
- Ballymacmurragh (53.07003°N 7.71923°W), contour fort
- Cumber Lower (53.08238°N 7.69885°W), multiple enclosure hillfort
- Killowen (53.39055°N 7.13422°W), partial contour fort
- Togher (53.33801°N 7.24701°W), contour fort

== County Roscommon ==
- Annagh (54.05738°N 8.18099°W), promontory fort
- Ballymore (53.73378°N 8.08651°W), promontory fort
- Beagh (53.73374°N 8.47092°W), promontory fort
- Carrowgarve (53.75229°N 8.41084°W), contour fort
- Carrowkeel (53.74561°N 8.42603°W), level terrain fort
- Carrowkeel (53.61633°N 8.23299°W), contour fort
- Castleruby (53.7762°N 8.31971°W), hillslope fort
- Castletenison Demesne (54.05922°N 8.18201°W), promontory fort
- Churchacres (54.05895°N 8.15796°W), promontory fort
- Dundermot (53.70016°N 8.45882°W), promontory fort
- Greaghnaglogh (54.1072°N 8.13721°W), promontory fort
- Killeenadeema (53.54462°N 8.18765°W), hillslope fort
- Moydow (53.57446°N 8.16506°W), contour fort
- Mullaghnashee (53.84192°N 8.48727°W), contour fort
- Rockville (53.8765°N 8.09183°W), partial contour fort
- Shankoagh (53.71315°N 8.44282°W), promontory fort
- Sroove (53.75871°N 8.20806°W), contour fort
- Warren (53.53705°N 7.98903°W), promontory fort

== County Sligo ==
- Ballyconnell (54.3633°N 8.67063°W), promontory fort
- Carrowgilhooly (54.25424°N 8.6783°W), level terrain fort
- Carrowmoran (54.25709°N 8.84139°W), promontory fort
- Carrowmoran (54.25482°N 8.83478°W), promontory fort
- Carrownrush (54.2611°N 8.87971°W), multiple enclosure hillfort
- Carrownrush (54.26874°N 8.87355°W), promontory fort
- Carrownrush (54.26946°N 8.87556°W), promontory fort
- Clogher Beg (54.2578°N 8.37773°W), promontory fort
- Donaghintraine (54.26527°N 8.85539°W), promontory fort
- Drumnagranshy (54.0613°N 8.43917°W), partial contour fort
- Hazelwood Demesne (54.25621°N 8.42004°W), promontory fort
- Kilkillogue (54.46941°N 8.46833°W), promontory fort
- Kncoklane (54.34906°N 8.67876°W), promontory fort
- Knocknashee (54.11789°N 8.6787°W), multiple enclosure hillfort
- Knoxspark (54.2067°N 8.50234°W), promontory fort
- Lahanagh (54.23986°N 8.42003°W), promontory fort
- Muckelty (54.07906°N 8.69122°W), contour fort
- Mullaghcor (54.07467°N 8.49124°W), contour fort
- Mullaghmore (54.45982°N 8.47218°W), promontory fort

== County Tipperary ==
- Ahenny (52.4114°N 7.40775°W), contour fort
- Ballincurra (52.77953°N 8.11321°W), contour fort
- Ballynamrossagh (52.44708°N 8.25243°W), contour fort
- Ballyneety (52.31466°N 7.87132°W), contour fort
- Curraghadobbin (52.40782°N 7.45808°W), multiple enclosure hillfort
- Farranshea (52.47652°N 7.65239°W), contour fort
- Garrangrena Lower (52.78084°N 7.98962°W), contour fort
- Kedrah (52.39669°N 7.90208°W), contour fort
- Kilbragh (52.48308°N 7.80026°W), multiple enclosure hillfort
- Knigh (52.91886°N 8.21157°W), multiple enclosure hillfort
- Knockadigeen (52.78909°N 8.09656°W), contour fort
- Laghtea (52.86471°N 8.39472°W), contour fort
- Liss (52.73303°N 7.95234°W), multiple enclosure hillfort
- Newpark 2 (52.54569°N 7.84138°W), contour fort
- Windmill (52.50202°N 7.89285°W), contour fort

== County Waterford ==
- Annestown (52.13937°N 7.28214°W), promontory fort
- Ballynaharda (51.98559°N 7.60712°W), promontory fort
- Ballynamona Lower (51.99696°N 7.58337°W), promontory fort
- Ballynarrid (52.12977°N 7.3908°W), promontory fort
- Ballynarrid (52.13097°N 7.38282°W), promontory fort
- Ballyvoony (52.1285°N 7.43291°W), promontory fort
- Carrickahilla (52.141619°N 7.468°W), partial contour fort
- Cluttahina (52.16734°N 7.82304°W), multiple enclosure hillfort
- Coolum (52.13456°N 7.08094°W), promontory fort
- Dunbrattin (52.13447°N 7.30828°W), promontory fort
- Dunbrattin (52.13436°N 7.30639°W), promontory fort
- Dunmore (Shanooan) (52.14595°N 6.99102°W), promontory fort
- Garrarus (52.13435°N 7.19849°W), promontory fort
- Islandhubbock (52.1073°N 7.48986°W), promontory fort
- Islandikane East/Islandikane South (52.13227°N 7.21956°W), promontory fort
- Kilfarrasy (52.1336°N 7.24373°W), promontory fort
- Kilnamack East (52.33419°N 7.75056°W), contour fort
- Knockatrellane (52.25956°N 7.72259°W), contour fort
- Knockmahon (52.1377°N 7.35431°W), promontory fort
- Lissard (52.11597°N 7.55951°W), contour fort
- Rathmoylan (52.13465°N 7.03504°W), promontory fort
- Shanakill (52.05337°N 7.82153°W), contour fort
- Stradballymore (52.12332°N 7.44834°W), promontory fort
- West-town (52.13415°N 7.18485°W), promontory fort
- Woodstown (52.13787°N 7.27012°W), promontory fort

== County Westmeath ==
- Bigwood (53.73537°N 7.31158°W), contour fort

== County Wexford ==
- Ballybuckley (52.44402°N 6.60273°W), contour fort
- Ballyhoge (52.39957°N 6.56622°W), promontory fort
- Courthoyle New (52.38691°N 6.79196°W), contour fort
- Glen (Richards) (52.61704°N 6.22232°W), promontory fort
- Nook (52.26282°N 6.9748°W), promontory fort
- Ramstown (52.17495°N 6.8264°W), promontory fort
- Saltee Island Great (52.12227°N 6.60434°W), promontory fort
- Templetown (52.17219°N 6.8983°W), promontory fort

== County Wicklow ==
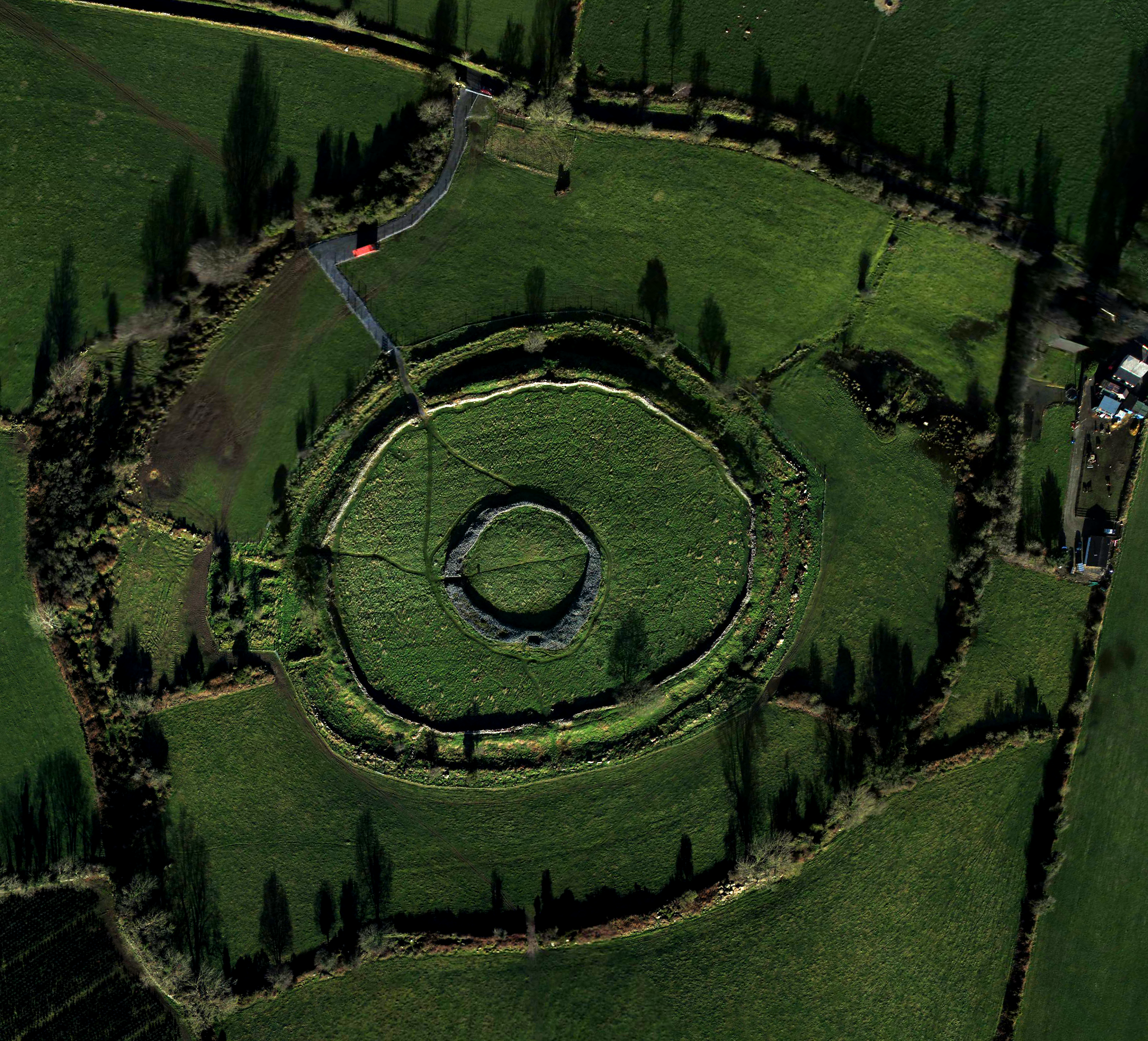
Rathgall hillfort

- Brusselstown Ring (52.96296°N 6.61645°W), multiple enclosure hillfort
- Coolagad (53.14848°N 6.1012°W), contour fort
- Downshill (53.12718°N 6.12904°W), partial contour fort
- Kilcashel (52.8723°N 6.23189°W), hillslope fort
- Kilpoole Upper (52.94387°N 6.01753°W), promontory fort
- Kilranlagh (52.94291°N 6.62228°W), contour fort
- Knockeen (52.80669°N 6.66241°W), multiple enclosure hillfort
- Oldcourt (53.16975°N 6.47354°W), contour fort
- Rathcoran (52.94784°N 6.68437°W), multiple enclosure hillfort
- Rathgall Hillfort (52.80223419°N 6.66314331°W), multiple enclosure hillfort
- Rathmoon (52.93377°N 6.72502°W), multiple enclosure hillfort
- Rathnagree (52.95367°N 6.69031°W), multiple enclosure hillfort
- Spinans Hill 1 (52.96716°N 6.63107°W), contour fort
- Spinans Hill 2 (52.96656°N 6.62408°W), contour fort
- Sruhaun (52.94645°N 6.69349°W), contour fort
- Tinoran (52.9592°N 6.73239°W), multiple enclosure hillfort
