= Baile an Daingin =

Baile an Daingin (Irish for 'town of the fortress') may refer to several villages in Ireland:

- Ballindangan, County Cork
- Ballindine, County Mayo
- Ballindaggin, County Wexford
