= Fermoy =

Town in County Cork, Ireland

Fermoy Mainistir Fhear Maí (Irish)
- Town
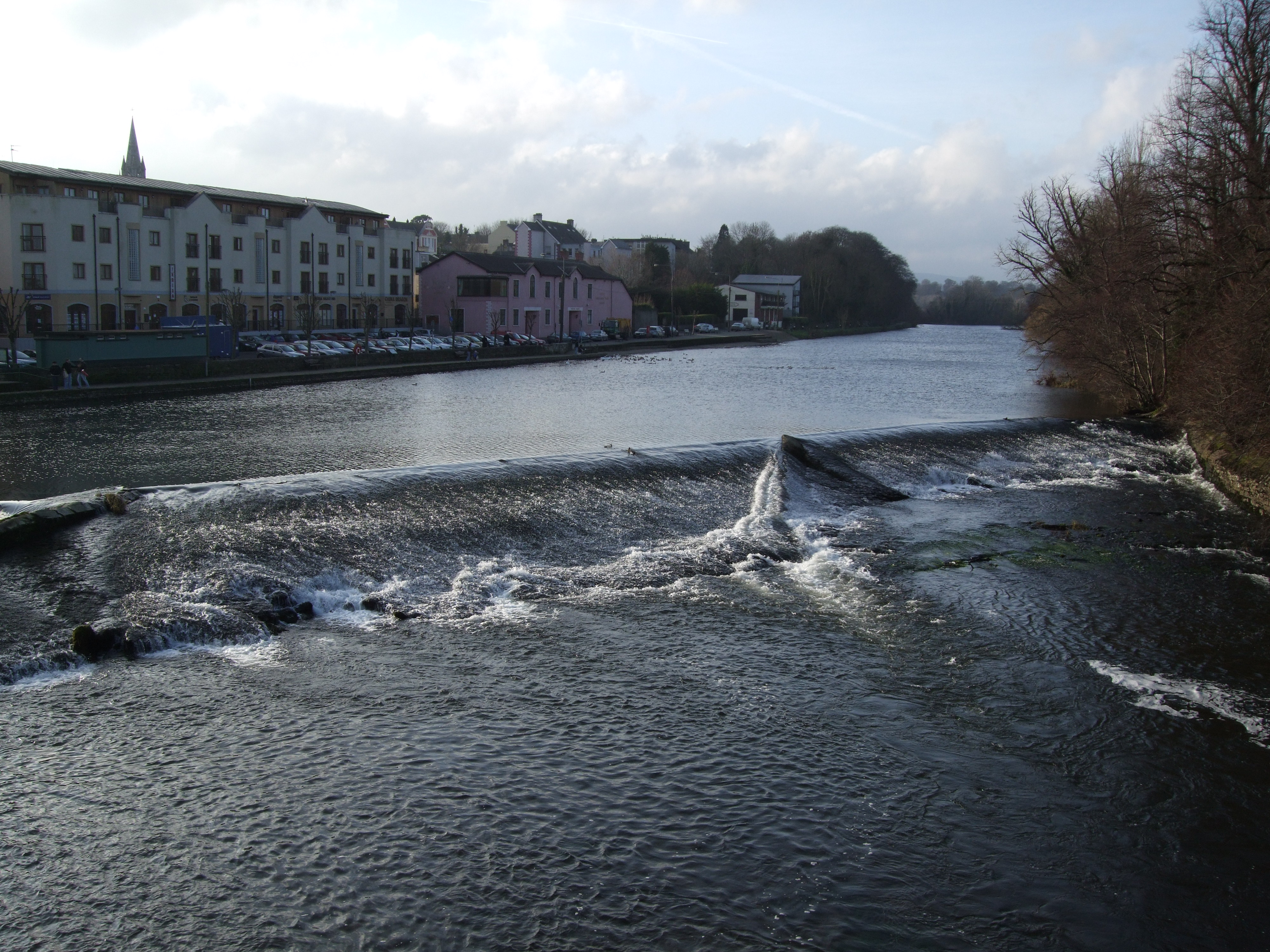
- The weir on the Munster Blackwater through Fermoy

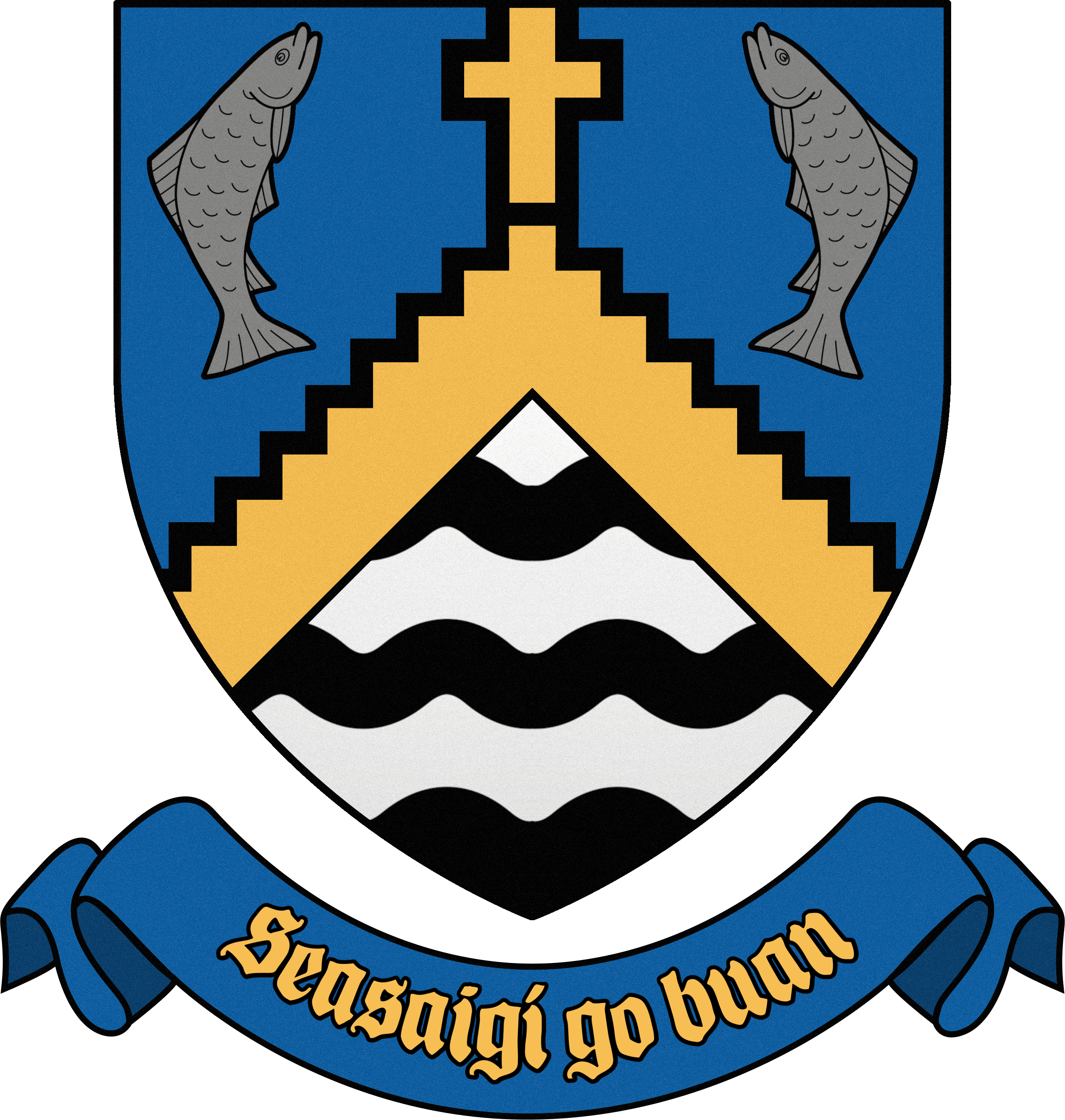
- Coat of arms
- Motto(s): Irish: Seasaigí Go Buan; Let you stand forever
- Location in Ireland
- Coordinates: 52.141°N 8.276°W
- Country: Ireland
- Province: Munster
- County: County Cork

Area
  - Total: 4.6 km^{2} (1.8 sq mi)
- Elevation: 50 m (160 ft)

Population (2022)
  - Total: 6,720
  - Density: 1,500/km^{2} (3,800/sq mi)
- Time zone: UTC±0 (WET)
  - Summer (DST): UTC+1 (IST)
- Eircode routing key: P61
- Telephone area code: +353(0)25
- Irish Grid Reference: W808987
- Website: fermoy.ie

Historical population
Year	Pop.	±%
1821	6,702	—
1831	6,976	+4.1%
1841	6,379	−8.6%
1851	5,846	−8.4%
1861	8,705	+48.9%
1871	7,388	−15.1%
1881	6,454	−12.6%
1891	6,469	+0.2%
1901	6,126	−5.3%
1911	6,863	+12.0%
1926	4,510	−34.3%
1936	4,123	−8.6%
1946	4,213	+2.2%
1951	4,017	−4.7%
1956	3,674	−8.5%
1961	3,667	−0.2%
1966	3,721	+1.5%
1971	4,033	+8.4%
1981	4,888	+21.2%
1986	4,885	−0.1%
1991	4,462	−8.7%
1996	4,469	+0.2%
2002	4,804	+7.5%
2006	5,673	+18.1%
2011	6,489	+14.4%
2016	6,585	+1.5%
2022	6,720	+2.1%

Fermoy (Irish: Mainistir Fhear Maí, meaning 'monastery of the men of the plain') is a town on the River Blackwater in east County Cork, Ireland. As of the 2022 census, the town and environs had a population of approximately 6,700 people. It is located in the historical barony of Condons and Clangibbon, and is in the Dáil constituency of Cork East.

The town's name is of Irish origin and refers to a Cistercian abbey founded in the 12th century. This abbey is believed to have been founded by Domnall Mór Ua Briain, King of Thomond.

== History ==
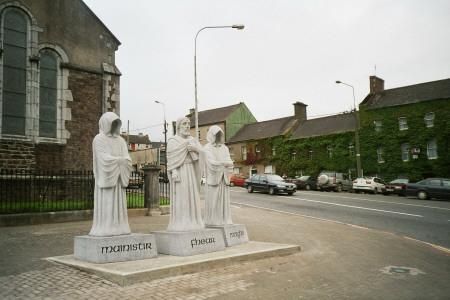
Mick Davis's sculpture from 2001 referencing Cistercian monks in Fermoy

=== Pre-history ===
A ringfort at Carntierna, on top of Corrin hill approximately 2.4 km (1.5 mi) south of Fermoy, was an important Iron Age site. Other archaeological sites in the area include multiple cairn, fulacht fiadh, bullaun stone and ringfort sites in the townlands of Fermoy, Duntahane, Corrin, Coolcarron and Carrignagroghera. A tower house (castle) in Carrigabrick townland is traditionally associated with the Condon family and was reputedly constructed on the site of an earlier fortification.

=== Medieval times ===
A Cistercian abbey, the abbey of St. Mary de Castro Dei, was founded at Fermoy in 1170. Following the dissolution of the monasteries during the Tudor period, the abbey and its lands passed through the following dynasties: Sir Richard Grenville, Robert Boyle and William Forward. However, the site could hardly have been regarded as a town and, by the late 18th century, was little more than a few cabins and an inn.

=== 18th and 19th centuries ===
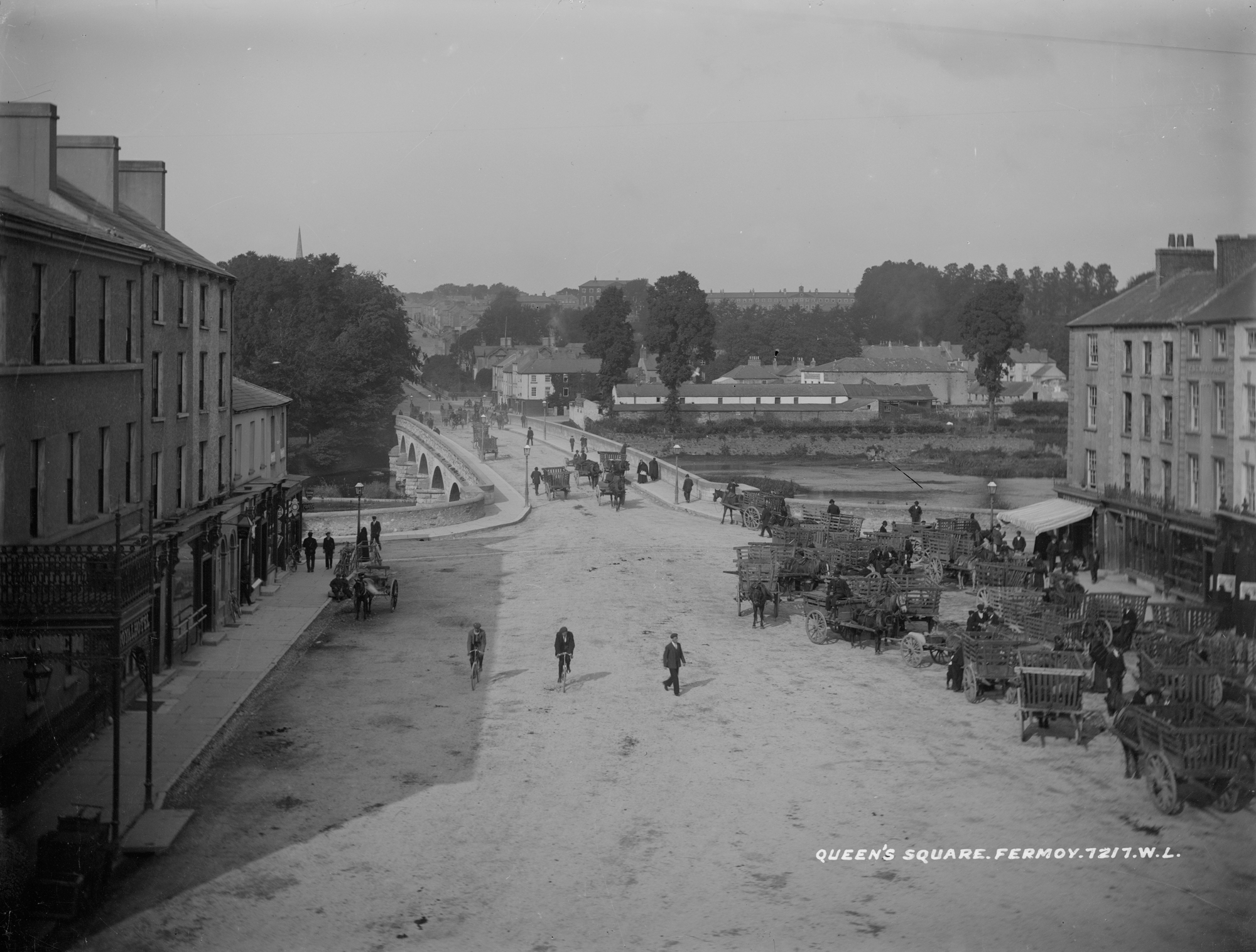
Pearse Square (then Queens Square) in Fermoy, c.1900

In 1791, the lands around Fermoy were bought by a Scotsman, John Anderson. He was an entrepreneur who developed the roads and started the mail coach system in Ireland. He designed the town and the streets remain much the same as they were originally built. In 1984, some of his descendants, living in Australia, named a winery, Fermoy Estate, after the town he established. A plaque and bust in his honour were unveiled at the entrance to the town park in 2001.

==== Garrison town ====
Fermoy was the site of Fermoy Barracks, a large British Army barracks, when Ireland was under British rule. In 1797, when the army was looking to establish a new and permanent base, Anderson gave them the land as an inducement to locate in Fermoy. Anderson and the town received economic benefit from the arrangement. In 1806 the first permanent barracks, the East Barracks, were built. They were located on 16 1/2 acres of land, and provided accommodation for 112 officers and 1478 men of infantry, and 24 officers, 120 men, and 112 horses of cavalry. A general 130-bed military hospital was also built. In 1809, the West Barracks was built. This also had a 42-bed hospital. When both barracks were complete, there was accommodation for 14 field officers, 169 officers, 2,816 men, and 152 horses. By the 1830s, this was the largest military establishment on the island of Ireland. The town of Fermoy expanded around these facilities and retained its British military facilities until 1922, when the Irish Free State was first established.

=== 20th century ===
During the Irish War of Independence the Irish Republican Army (led by the commandant of the Cork Number Two Brigade Liam Lynch) launched an attack using motor vehicles against a group of off-duty King's Shropshire Light Infantry (KSLI) soldiers on 7 September 1919 as they were attending a Wesleyan Church parade in Fermoy. The IRA killed one soldier (Pte. William Jones from Talog in Wales), wounded four and disarmed the rest of their weapons. After jurors from Fermoy serving on Jones' coroner inquest refused to return a verdict describing his death as a murder, 200 soldiers from the KSLI launched an unofficial reprisal against businesses owned by the jury, looting several drapery and shoe stores.

During the Irish Civil War anti treaty forces were compelled to evacuate Fermoy and burned the barracks and other buildings before retreating into surrounding hills (10 August 1922).

== Geography ==
Fermoy is situated on the river Blackwater and has steep hills corresponding to the river valley. The downtown area of Fermoy is located in a flood plain and has flooded relatively often in the late 20th and early 21st century. The most expensive flood prevention works ever carried out in Cork were completed in Fermoy in 2015.

The civil parish of Fermoy incorporates the Fermoy Urban electoral division (ED), much of the Fermoy Rural ED, and includes twelve sub-townlands.

== Demographics ==
As of the 2022 census, Fermoy had a population of 6,720. Of these, 66% were white Irish, 1% white Irish travellers, 20% other white ethnicities, 2% were black, 2% Asian, 2% other ethnicities and 7% did not state their ethnicity. In terms of religion the area was 71% Catholic, 9% other stated religions, 13% had no religion, and 7% did not state a religion.

== Economy ==
Industries in and around the town include chemical production (by Micro Bio), ice-cream manufacturing (by Silver Pail), and power product manufacturing (by Anderson Power). The town's industries also include electronics manufacturing and assembly by Sanmina-SCI Corporation, formerly Space Craft Incorporated.

Moorepark Research Institute, near Fermoy, is an agricultural and food research institute run by Teagasc.

== Education ==
Local secondary schools include St. Colman's College, Loreto Convent and Coláiste an Chraoibhín. Primary schools include Gaelscoil de hÍde, Presentation Primary School, Bishop Murphy Memorial School, St. Josephs National School, Adair National School and Grange National School.

== Tourism ==
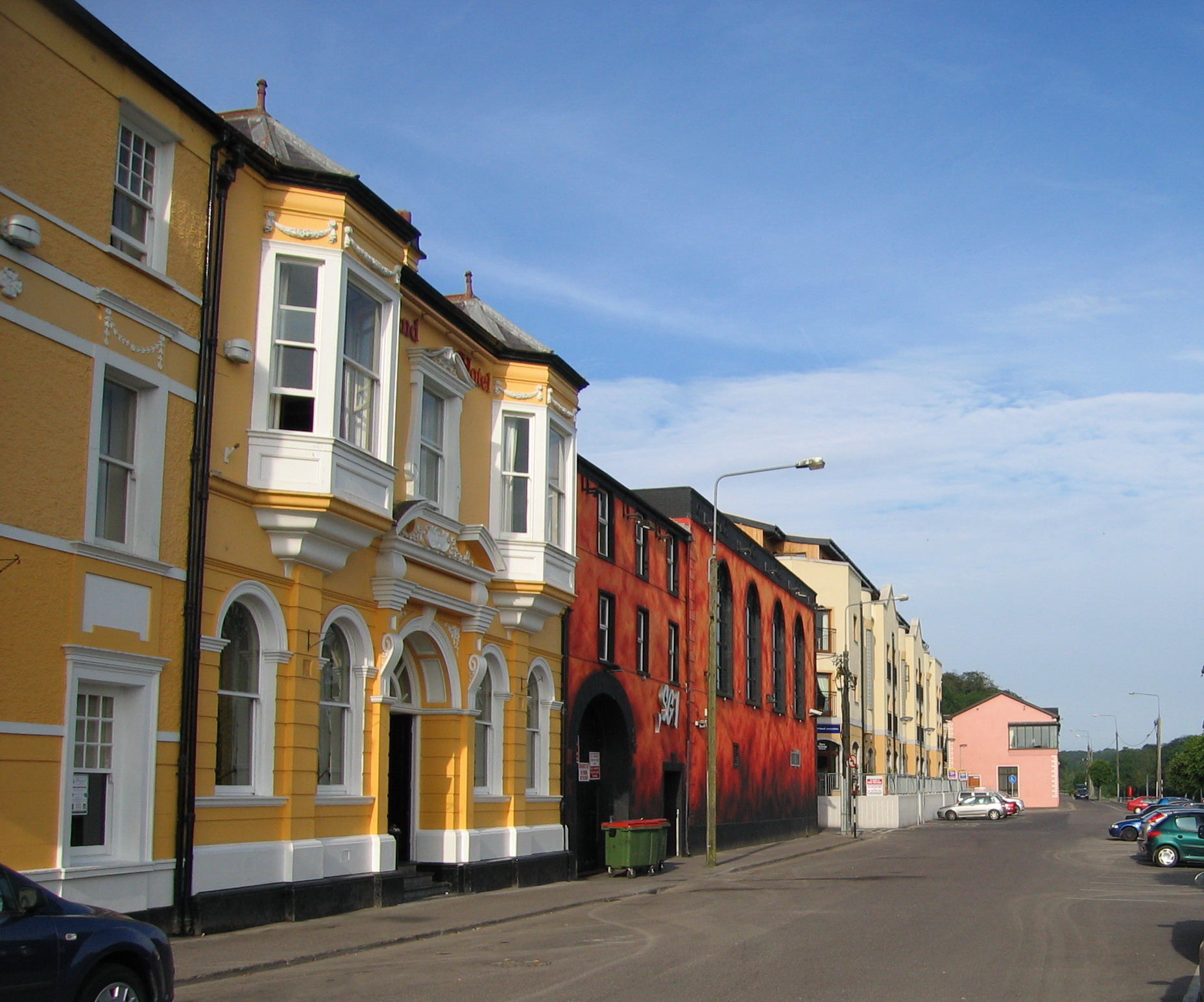
Former Grand Hotel, Fermoy

The Blackwater river is one of the town's major attractions and is popular for its salmon and coarse fishing. There is also a river-side walk amenity at Barnane.

Two annual regattas are usually in early May and early September and hosted by Fermoy Rowing Club. Fermoy Rowing Club celebrated its 125th anniversary in 2009, and Fermoy Regatta celebrated its 70th anniversary in the same year.

Fermoy hosted a poetry festival for the first time in 2012.

== Transport ==
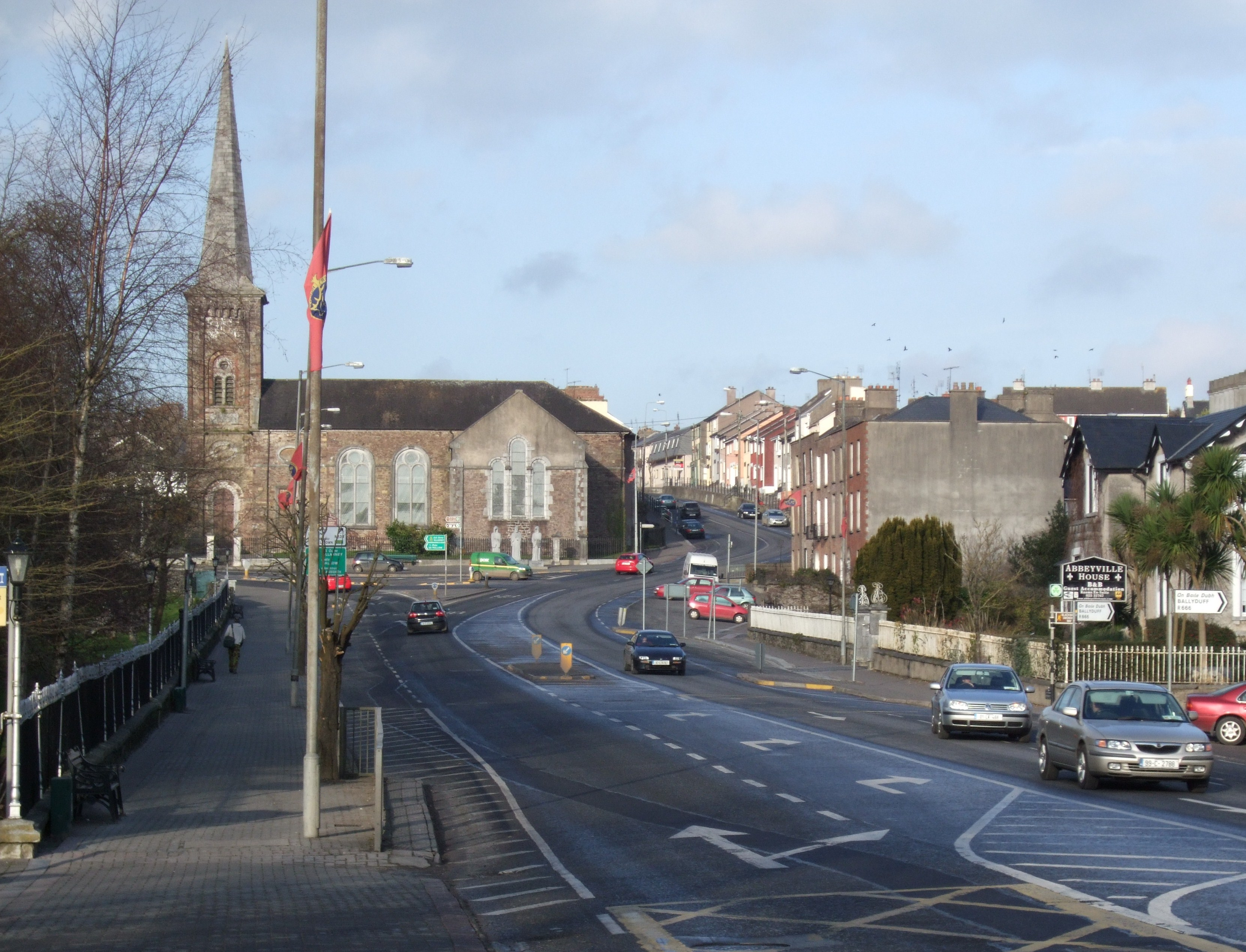
The R639 through Fermoy

For many years the main N8 Cork–Dublin road ran through Fermoy, and the town square was a bottleneck on the route. However, the M8 motorway bypass, which included a new bridge over the Blackwater to the east of the town was opened in late 2006. The former N8 through the town is now a regional road, the R639, and Fermoy's traffic problems have been eased.

The town used to be connected to the Irish railway system, on a line from Mallow to Waterford, with a junction to nearby Mitchelstown through Ballindangan (see Irish railway history). Fermoy railway station opened on 17 May 1860, and finally closed on 27 March 1967.

The nearest airport is Cork Airport, approximately 45 kilometres (28 miles) to the south.

A number of bus services serve the area, including the Bus Éireann Cork-Dublin 245X route and Cork-Clonmel 245 route, which stop at Fermoy.

== Religion ==
The Christian Brothers, the Presentation and Loreto Sisters and Jehovah's Witnesses maintain a presence in the town. There is also a Church of Ireland (Anglican) church; Christ Church, and a Presbyterian church. A Christian cross was erected on the local Corrin hill during the 1933 Holy Year.

== Sport ==
Fermoy GAA, the local Gaelic Athletic Association club, won the Cork Premier Intermediate Football Championship in 2018. The club's grounds, at Páirc Mhic Gearailt, have hosted league and championship games.

== Film ==
Some aerial scenes from 1966 war film The Blue Max were filmed near Fermoy, with the nearby Blackwater viaduct featuring on screen.

In the 1980s, a coming-of-age film called The Clash of the Ash was shot in Fermoy.

== People ==
- Patrick Collins (1844–1905), a US Representative from Massachusetts and mayor of Boston, was born near Fermoy.
- Conor and Sheila Dwyer, a married couple who disappeared in 1991 in what has been described as one of Ireland's most puzzling missing persons cases.
- Mary Hegarty, Irish operatic soprano
- John Stanislaus Joyce (1849–1931), father of James Joyce, was educated in Fermoy.
- Kenneth MacKenzie (1758-c.1837), highly praised poet during what Celticist Robert Dunbar termed the "eighteenth century Golden Age" of Scottish Gaelic literature, who, towards the end of his life, was postmaster of Fermoy
- John Magnier, owner of Coolmore Stud.
- Noel Mahony (1913–2006), first-class cricketer and president of the Irish Cricket Union.
- James McConnell (1815–1883) was born in Fermoy, and was a founder member of the Institution of Mechanical Engineers.
- Arthur O'Callaghan (1837–1930), Member of Parliament in New Zealand
- Michelle O'Neill, deputy leader of Sinn Féin and First Minister of Northern Ireland, was born in Fermoy.
- Patrick Rice (1945–2010), a human rights activist, was born in Fermoy.
- Mike Ross, professional rugby union player for Leinster and Ireland, went to school in Fermoy.
- George Throssell (1840–1910), the second premier of Western Australia, was born in Fermoy.
- Una Troy (1910–1993), a novelist and playwright, was born in Fermoy.
- Ted Walsh, jockey and horse trainer, was born in Fermoy.

== Twin towns ==
As of 2020, Fermoy is twinned with Ploemeur, in the Brittany region of France. The two towns have had connections since 1982.

From 2006 until 2020, Fermoy was twinned with Nowa Dęba in Poland. When, in early 2020, it was brought to the attention of Fermoy's town council that Nowa Dęba had adopted resolutions against "LGBT ideology" and "propaganda", the council said that they would end the agreement if Nowa Dęba did not reverse its decision to declare itself an "LGBT-free zone". This did not happen, and Fermoy's town council terminated the twinning agreement in October 2020. In January 2021, Nowa Dęba's council voted to revoke the controversial declaration; a decision welcomed by the LGBT community and activists.

== See also ==
- List of abbeys and priories in Ireland (County Cork)
- List of towns and villages in Ireland
- Fermoy (barony)
