= Disappearance of Conor and Sheila Dwyer =

1991 missing persons case

Conor and Sheila Dwyer
- Born: Ireland
- Disappeared: 1 May 1991 (ages 62 and 61); Fermoy, County Cork, Ireland
- Status: Missing for 35 years, 6 months and 7 days

Locations
1 Chapel Hill, Fermoy

Conor and Sheila Dwyer are a married couple from Fermoy, County Cork, Ireland who were reported as missing persons shortly after Sheila last spoke to her sister by phone on 1 May 1991. The last known sighting of the couple was the day previous whilst heading towards a funeral at St. Patrick's Church a short walk from their home in Chapel Hill, Fermoy. Despite alleged sightings both in Ireland and overseas and numerous public appeals for information by Garda Síochána in the decades since, neither the couple or their white Toyota Cressida has yet been found. The mystery behind their disappearance has been referred to as "one of the most enduring and baffling missing persons mysteries" in Ireland and continues to generate speculation. The case is also highly unusual in that it involves the rare instance of a missing couple, rather than an individual.

== Background ==
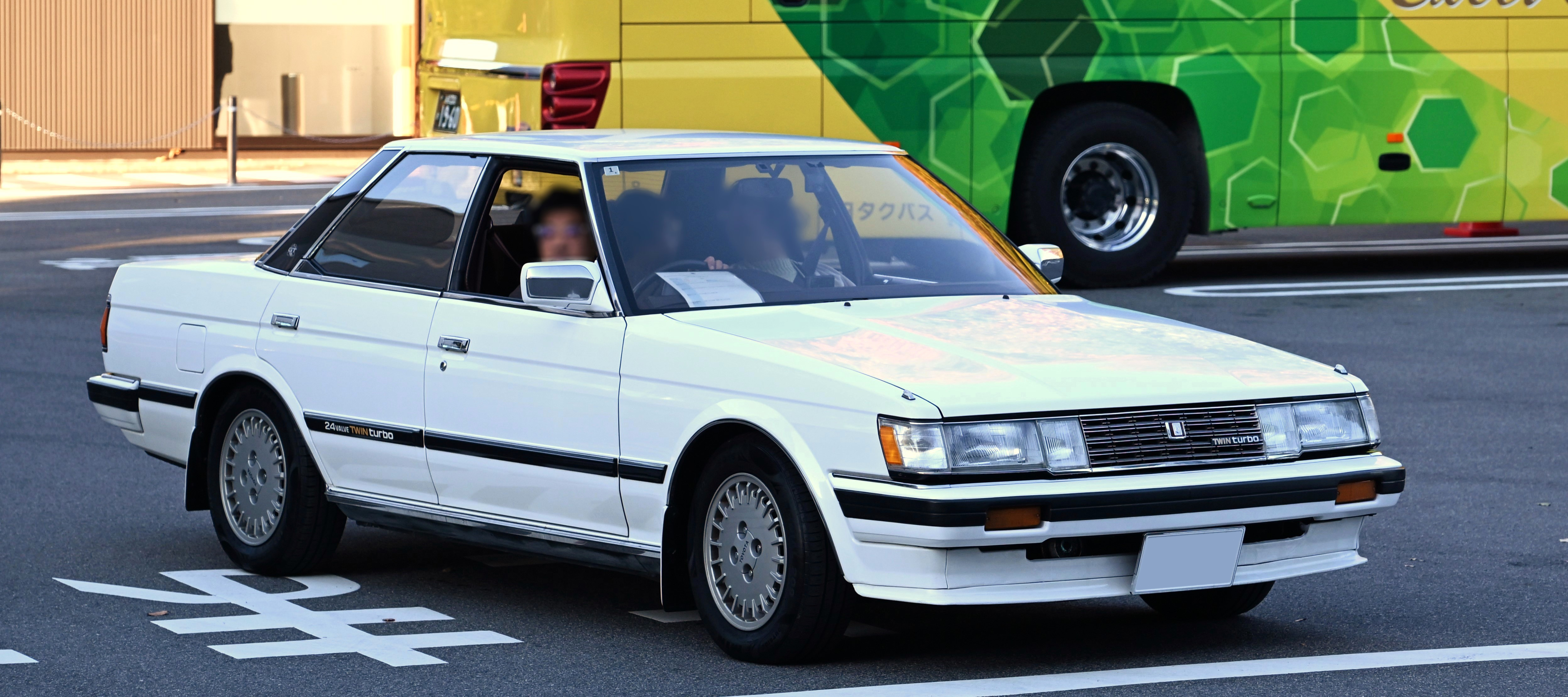
White Toyota Cressida similar to the one missing.

By 1991, Conor and Sheila Dwyer resided at their home in Chapel Hill, Fermoy. By the time of their disappearance, both their adult sons were living and working in London. Their son, Conor Jr., later described he and his brother had a "happy and normal" upbringing in the household. He also remembered his father had a tendency for practical jokes.

Conor had previously worked as a hackney cab driver and plumber, and by 1991, was employed as handyman and chauffeur for the German businessman and multi-millionaire Fritz Wolff. Wolff owned a property in Castlelyons, outside Fermoy. As part of his employment, Conor often drove a vintage Rolls Royce owned by Wolff, which many in Fermoy assumed Conor himself owned. Conor was regarded locally as a "colourful character" who had a great love of "sleek, prestige" cars. One resident later remembered given Fermoy was primarily a working class area at the time the sort of cars Conor drove did not go unnoticed.

In 1969, Conor went before the local court in Fermoy on a charge of assaulting a youth following an incident where three young men were knocking on doors in the Chapel Hill area and running away before the resident answered. These incidents apparently continued for a number of weeks at the end of the previous year and upset a number of residents, including the Dwyers. After another occurrence of these, Conor intercepted one of those responsible and gave them a kick in the rear. After Conor voluntarily informed the Gardaí of the incident, the sympathetic judge later did not issue a punishment. In 1974, in one instance Conor was fined for dangerous driving during his work as a hackney cab driver. He did not turn up to court and was fined by the judge.

One profile written about the couple after their disappearance, which featured an interview with Conor's brother, indicated Conor had been previously hospitalised for depression and had suffered from it since. It has also been erroneously suggested Conor had previously disappeared in the 1980s for a number of years and returned to his family home with no explanation. However, aside from this one example, this detail never features in articles or appeals related to the case nor is a previous disappearance of Conor listed anywhere on the public record. Notably, his brother, had earlier stated prior to May 1991 Conor had never gone missing before. Similarly, in 2020, a retired Garda Sergeant who worked on the case stated that rumours of a previous disappearance by Conor were completely unfounded. Otherwise Conor was described by one neighbour as "fond of life" and "a man who was never in bad form".

Sheila worked as a homemaker. She was described by a neighbour as "a lovely, polite woman" and often noted for dressing "elegant". Sheila also had a close relationship with her sisters Maisie and Nellie, regularly phoning them in the weeks before May 1991.

A colleague of Conor's who also worked on Wolff's property remembered him as a "kind, gentle and honest man" and the couple "just nice people to be around". Their son, Conor Jr., stated in an interview, "I didn't know anyone who disliked them, and I can't see them having any enemies. They were local, friendly, respected people." Conor and Sheila were described by friends as a close, but reserved couple "who kept to themselves" and generally well liked in their community. They were also regarded as "inseparable" and kept up a weekly routine of shopping, attending church and contacting family and friends. Due to their fine way of dress, and Sheila's tendency to give passers-by a 'regal' wave from their car, they were quite recongisable within the locality.

Conor Jr. later recalled he spoke by phone to his parents on the St. Patrick's Day before their disappearance and they "seemed fine". The couple were also in the process of selling a plot of land they owned elsewhere in the town, and had just received an offer on it. There was no evidence they were in financial trouble.

Strangely, over a year before the couple's disappearance, William Fennessy, a 54 year-old former Fermoy town councillor, had also gone missing. Similarly to the Dwyers, Fennessy's car, a Daihatsu Charade, could also not be traced. Despite initial speculation, Fennessy's disappearance was determined to have no connection to the Dwyers.

== Disappearance ==
The last known physical sighting of the couple was walking from their home towards the nearby St. Patrick's Church to attend a funeral on 30 April. They were greeted by a local girl who knew the couple. The following day, on 1 May, the last known contact was when Sheila briefly spoke by phone to her sister Maisie, with the former indicating nothing was wrong.

No-one spoke to the couple for over three weeks, which raised the alarm for Sheila's sisters, Maisie and Nellie. The sisters initially called other relatives, friends of the couple and even a colleague of Conor's to try and locate them. The couple had previously gone away for a week or two on holiday before, but had always returned, and never without indicating their plans to someone. On 22 May, at the request of family members, Gardaí gained entry to the couple's property on Chapel Hill. The house appeared undisturbed, with the beds neatly made, electrical appliances off and some blinds down. The couple's passports were located and glasses belonging to each of the couple were found on the living room couch. One item of note found was a biscuit tin containing money over £1,000 Irish pounds in a secret location only known to family. Similarly, no major financial withdrawals were listed on their bank accounts. There was also much of the couple's clothing still present, indicating they had not planned a lengthy trip.

The only object of note missing belonging to the couple was Conor's car, a white Toyota Cressida, with the licence plate number 5797 ZT. Gardaí have since speculated locating the car is the key to solving the case.

At the time of their disappearance, Conor and Sheila were respectively 62 and 61. Conor was described in reports as 5'8" in height and weighing 11 stone. He had dark hair parted to the right, wore dark-rimmed glasses, was a pipe smoker. He was dressed in a check sports jacket with a navy lightweight trenchcoat. Sheila was described as 5'4" in height, with fair/blonde hair. She was last seen in a light woollen tailored jacket, with white leather walking shoes.

== Investigation ==
Given the proximity and prominence of the River Blackwater through Fermoy, Garda divers searched the river several times. There were also searches of the quays around Cobh in East Cork.

Ferry records in Ireland indicated no car matching the description or licence plate of their car had left the country during this period. Similarly, an appeal if any parts being sold of a car matching its make and description drew no response.

There had been speculation the couple were involved in financial trouble or Conor had become involved in the illegal drug trade, but neither rumour was substantiated. Some friends of the couple allegedly suggested the possibility of a suicide pact but no evidence of this has been found.

In 1993, a reconstruction of the couple's last known movements and a public appeal by Gardaí was featured on the programme Crimeline broadcast on RTE One. This resulted in potential leads from the public for the investigation.

There were numerous reported sightings of the couple across Ireland and occasionally overseas. A woman from Ballyvollane, near Fermoy, believed she spotted the couple at an airport in Lourdes, France in June 1991 and later recognised them on the Crimeline appeal into their disappearance. Prior to this, she had been unaware of the Dwyers; however, the appearances and behaviour of the couple she briefly interacted with had struck her at the time. In 1993, there was another possible sighting in Munich, Germany; however, Bavarian Police and Interpol were unable to confirm it. The location initially intrigued Gardai because of Conor Dwyer's employment for Fritz Wolff. Wolff himself had been interviewed by Gardaí but had been out of the country by the time of the couple's disappearance. Gardaí generally believe any sightings of the couple since 1991 were well-intentioned but mistaken.

In 2000, acting on a tip, Gardaí searched a quarry in Aherla, west Cork, but nothing related to the couple was found. No further explanation was provided on the background that led to the search.

== Later developments ==
In 1997, the couple's home on Chapel Hill was sold in a public auction along with a separate site they owned elsewhere in Fermoy. This followed a court order obtained by the Bank of Ireland, with the proceedings of the sale shared between the bank and the Dwyers' relatives.

In 2008, a radio programme entitled 'Into Thin Air' was broadcast by Documentary on One on RTE Radio 1. The programme looked at the respective disappearances of both the Dwyers and Fennessy.

Former neighbours and the Dwyers' son, Conor, were interviewed. At the time, Conor gave the view his parents could possibly still be alive. He also added, "I question myself sometimes. Why this, why that, why the other thing? How? Why? When? What? I don't know. And that's what keeps you awake at night. It rattles around in my brain all the time. There's a void of information. It's very bizarre and inexplicable — it's a living nightmare."

In 2012, in Fermoy, a routine dive by a local sub aqua search and rescue team in the Blackwater river found William Fennessy's car with his remains inside, over two decades since he was reported missing. The nature of the discovery, particularly in close proximity to where Fennessy was last seen, has led to speculation the Dwyers' car could similarly be found in the nearby river and perhaps missed on previous searches.

In 2017, the obituary for Maisie Sweeney referred to her sister as "the late Sheila" which indicated a widespread belief among the family the couple were deceased.

In 2023, the lead detective noted that, in relation to the case, Gardaí still "get calls and emails from the public and we welcome that". He emphasised nothing in terms of theories has yet been ruled out, including the couple's car entering the River Blackwater; however, "that is just one possibility".

In 2024, similar to 1993, a re-enactment of the Dwyer's last movements and public appeal by Gardaí featured on the now re-titled Crimecall. The appeal also asked members of the public for information if the couple ever visited Cobh or other areas regularly in their car. Gardaí were also eager to talk to anyone who may have conversed with the couple around the time of their disappearance. The renewed appeal came as it was reported that Gardaí were re-examining the case file and interviewing surviving witnesses along with the original investigation team.

In 2025, it was reported that Gardaí were pursuing new leads as a result of the appeal from the previous year. Several people had come forward with new information related to Conor's employment and interactions with the couple in the months before they disappeared. One line of inquiry being investigated was Conor's conversations with work colleagues in the weeks leading up to his disappearance.

In 2026, as the thirty-fifth anniversary of the couple's disappearance beckoned, it was revealed Gardaí were now convinced the Dwyers never left Ireland. However, a Garda source added, “There were lots of theories but no hard evidence or information. That was always the problem. There were always more questions than answers." Closer to the anniversary, it was reported local water sports groups have offered to survey stretches of the River Blackwater to see if possibly the couple's car could be found. The river bed may have been altered following winter floods of several decades. Given several sub-aqua clubs have side-scan sonar, this could allow for detailed mapping of the river bed for objects.

The mystery of the couple's disappearance continues to be featured regularly in news articles and true crime podcasts.

== See also ==
- List of people who disappeared mysteriously: post-1970
