= Cloghans =

Townland near Ballina, County Mayo, Ireland

Cloghans An Clochán
- Townland
- Cloghan's Pier on the shore of Lough Conn

- Location within Ireland
- Coordinates: 54°04′14″N 09°13′00″W
- Country: Ireland
- County: Mayo
- Municipal district: Ballina
- Electoral division: Carrowmore

Area
  - Total: 1.04 km^{2} (0.40 sq mi)
- Elevation: 14 m (46 ft)

Cloghans (Irish: An Clochán) is a townland in the parish of Kilbelfad and historical barony of Tirawley, County Mayo in Ireland. It is situated on the eastern shore of Lough Conn, at an average elevation of 14 metres above the sea level. The nearest townlands are Knockanillaun, Newtowngore, Gortogher and Gurteens, and the nearest towns are Crossmolina and Ballina. The Rathduff church is within the townland. Cloghans is approximately 1.04 square kilometres (0.4 sq mi) in area.
