= Corrin Hill Cross =

Landmark on a hill near Fermoy, Cork, Ireland

- Corrin Hill Cross February 2012
- Interactive map of Corrin Hill Cross
- 52.115068°N 8.283339°W

History
- Built: 1933

Site notes
- Area: 111 ha (forest park)

The Corrin Hill Cross is a Christian cross on a hill near Fermoy in County Cork in Ireland. Originally known as Carn Thiernagh, the hill is a religious and royal site which dates to the Bronze Age. A ruined ring fort, known as Carntierna and dated to the Iron Age, is located near the top of the hill. The mythological druid Mug Ruith was reputedly buried there. The hill, which overlooks the Cork-Dublin motorway, is 222 meters high.

In 1933, during the "Holy Year" dedicated by Pope Pius XI to mark the 1900th anniversary of the crucifixion, a local group erected a stone cross on the hill. The Corrin Hill Cross is approximately 9m high and stands on land maintained by Coillte who also maintain the walk through the woods and up the hill. This walking route is marked by stations of the cross.

In 2026, there were concerns about the figure on the cross and work was begun to maintain it. The figure of Jesus is due to be replaced with a new statue, completed by artist Mick Wilkins and weighing 300kg and measuring 2.8m in height.

The summit cross on Corrin Hill can reputedly be seen from "miles around", including from parts of County Tipperary.
