= Kileenemer Church =

- Killeenemer Church
- Cill Aonamra
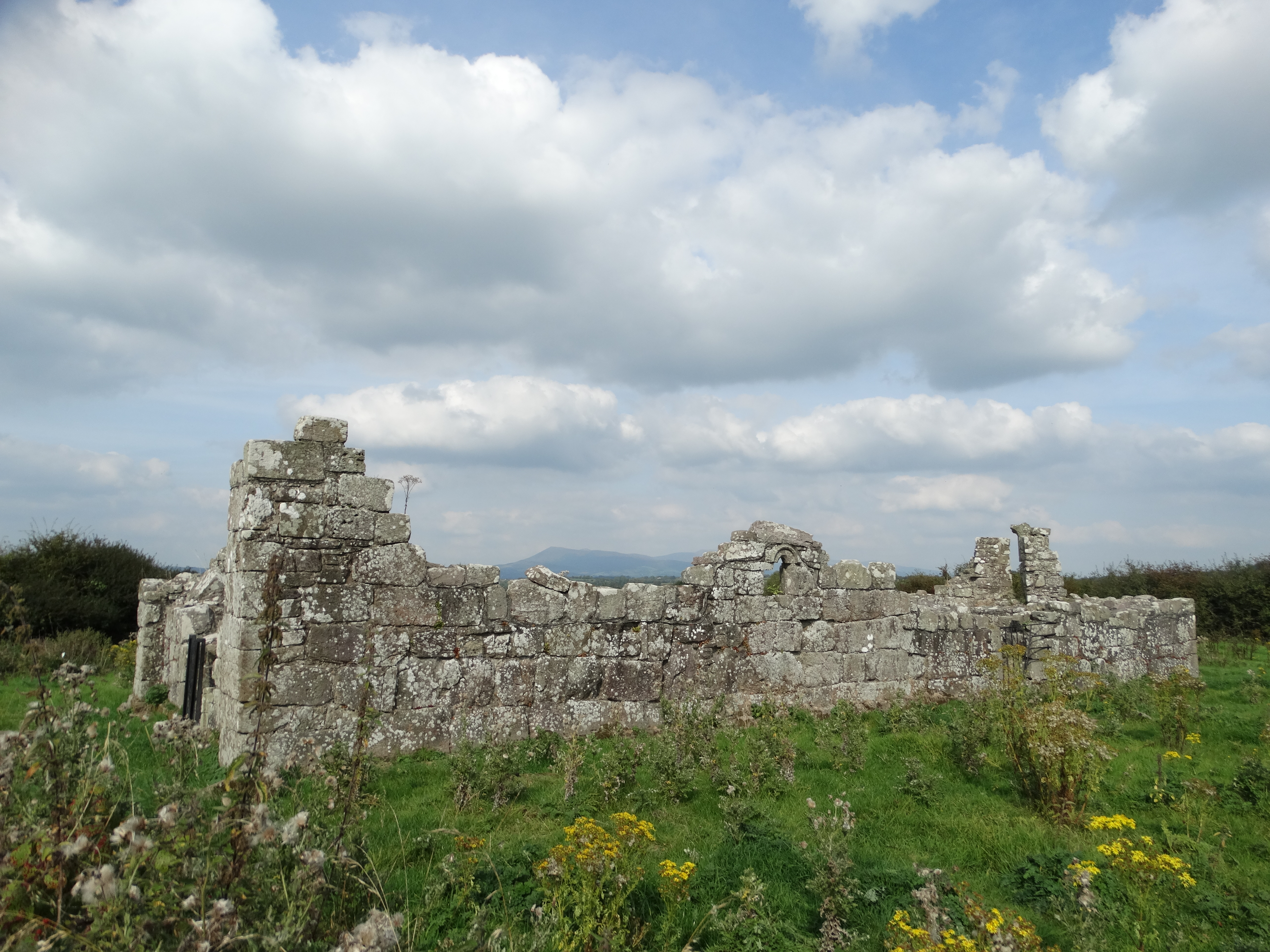

- Location within Ireland
- 52.215483°N 8.328405°W
- Location: Killeenemer, Ballindangan, County Cork
- Country: Ireland
- Denomination: Catholic (pre-Reformation)

Architecture
- Functional status: ruined
- Style: Romanesque
- Years built: c. 12th century AD

Specifications
- Length: 17 m (56 ft)
- Width: 9 m (30 ft)
- Height: 1.5 m (4 ft 11 in) (max height of remaining walls)
- Materials: stone, mortar

Administration
- Diocese: Cloyne

National monument of Ireland
- Official name: Kileenemer
- Reference no.: 316

Kileenemer Church is a medieval church and a National Monument in County Cork, Ireland.

== Location ==
The church is located 2.5 kilometres (1.6 mi) south of Ballindangan, to the east of the River Funshion.

== History ==
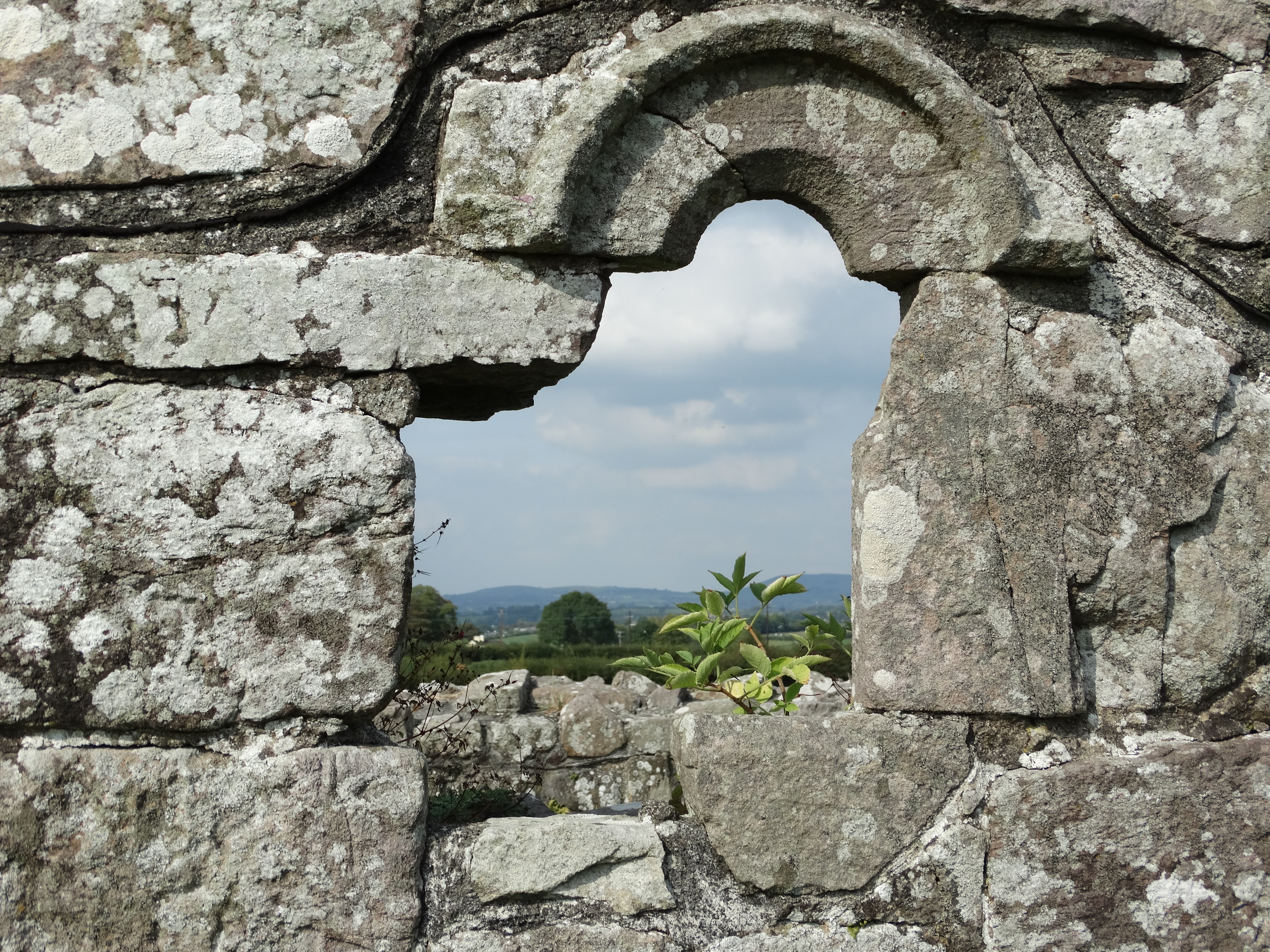
Window detail

The church was built around the 12th century. A change in masonry style in the south wall shows that the church was extended eastwards at some point after its initial construction.

The etymology is uncertain; it may have originally been Cillín Íomair, "Ivor's little church."

== Church ==
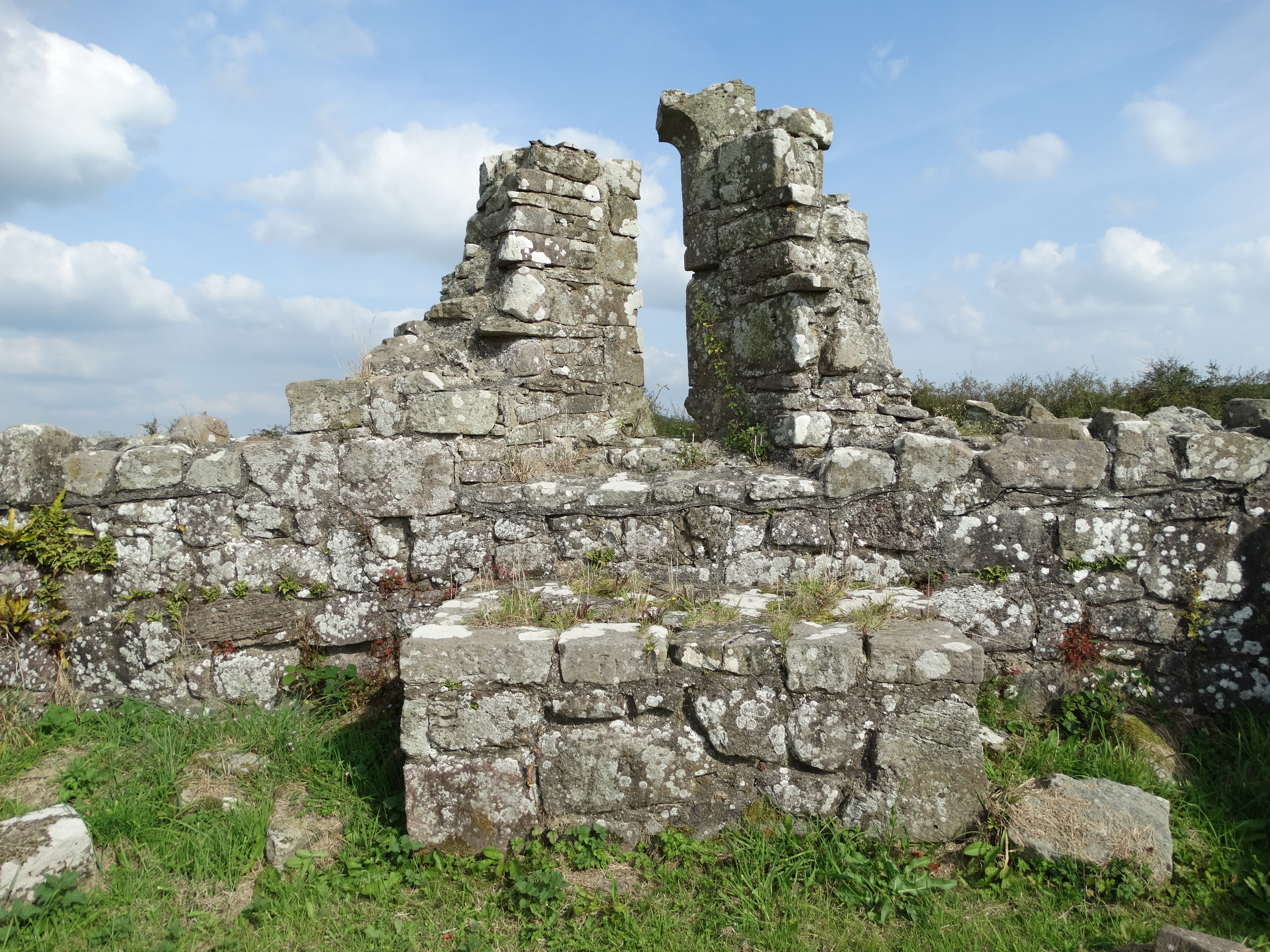
Sky window

The church is rectangular, with the roof absent. The west wall has a central doorway with rounded arch. The antae at the corners of the west wall have been partly rebuilt. Many of the stones bear horseshoe-shaped mason's marks.

Around is an early ecclesiastical enclosure. A bullaun is nearby.
