= Farranahineeny Stone Row =

- Galláin Fhearann na hIníne (Irish)
- Location within Ireland
- 51°47′42″N 9°08′20″W
- Type: Standing stones (stone row)
- Location: Farranahineeny, Inchigeelagh, County Cork, Ireland

History
- Built: c. 2000 BC

Site notes
- Elevation: 192 m (630 ft)
- Height: 1 m (3 ft 3 in)

National monument of Ireland
- Official name: Farranahineeny
- Reference no.: 374

Farranahineeny Stone Row is a stone row and National Monument located in County Cork, Ireland.

== Location ==
Farranahineeny Stone Row is located 3.4 mi (5.5 mi) south of Inchigeelagh, east of the Shehy Mountains.

== History ==
The stones possibly date to the Bronze Age period.

The purpose of standing stones is unclear; they may have served as boundary markers, ritual or ceremonial sites, burial sites or astrological alignments.
