= Blossomfort =

Ringfort in Cork, Ireland

- Lios Ard Bláiche (Irish)
- Location within Ireland
- 52.161504°N 8.754160°W
- Type: ringfort
- Location: Blossomfort, Ballyclogh, County Cork, Ireland

History
- Built: c. AD 550–900

Site notes
- Material: earth
- Owner: state

National monument of Ireland
- Official name: Blossomfort
- Reference no.: 594

Blossomfort is a ringfort (rath) and National Monument (#594) located in County Cork, Ireland.

== Location ==
Blossomfort is located 1 kilometer southwest of Ballyclogh.

== History and description ==
Blossomfort is a circular lios, 60 m (200 ft) in diameter with an entrance in the northeast corner. Ringforts of this type were mostly built c. AD 550–900. Internally people were housed in wooden huts. Another fort lies immediately to the northeast; this may have served as a livestock enclosure.
