= Carntierna =

Ringfort in County Cork, Ireland

- Carn Tigernac (Irish)
- Carn Tigherna, Carn Tierna
- Location within Ireland
- 52.114963°N 8.282850°W
- Type: ringfort
- Location: Coolcarron, Fermoy, County Cork, Ireland

History
- Built: Iron Age (500 BC – AD 500)

Site notes
- Elevation: 222 m (728 ft)

National monument of Ireland
- Official name: Carntierna
- Reference no.: 592

Carntierna is a ringfort and National Monument located in County Cork, Ireland.

== Location ==
Carntierna is located atop Corrin Hill in the Nagle Mountains, 2.4 km (1.5 mi) south of Fermoy.

== History and description ==
Carntierna was built between 500 BC and AD 500, during Ireland's Iron Age; it is one of only three "hillforts" in north Cork. The name is Irish for "Tigernac's cairn", named after Tigernac Tetbannach, legendary King of Munster in the time of Conchobar mac Nessa.

A great cairn lies atop the hill, supposedly the king's burial-place.

== See also ==
- Corrin Hill Cross
