= Lissacresig Ringfort =

Ringfort in County Cork, Ireland

Lissacresig
- Lios an Chraosaigh (Irish)
- Location within Ireland
- 51.924359°N 9.055811°W
- Type: ringfort and axial stone circle
- Cultures: Gaelic Ireland
- Location: Lissacresig, Macroom, County Cork, Ireland

History
- Built: c. AD 550–900

Site notes
- Material: earth
- Area: 3,760 m^{2} (40,500 sq ft)
- Owner: state

National monument of Ireland
- Official name: Lissacresig
- Reference no.: 571

Lissacresig is a ringfort (rath) and National Monument (#571) located in County Cork, Ireland.

== Location ==
Lissacresig is located 6.7 km west-northwest of Macroom, in the hills between the River Sullane and River Foherish.

== History and description ==
Lissacresig is a circular lios, 70 m (230 ft) in diameter with entrances in the southwest and northeast corners. The name means "ringfort of the glutton." Ringforts of this type were mostly built c. AD 550–900. Internally people were housed in wooden huts. Another fort lies 900 m to the northwest; this may have served as a livestock enclosure. There are three monoliths (gallauns) and an axial stone circle in the area as well. The stone circle is formed of five large boulders; unusually, the axial stone is the longest.
