= Skeagh Cairn =

National Monument in County Cork, Ireland

- Carn na Sceiche
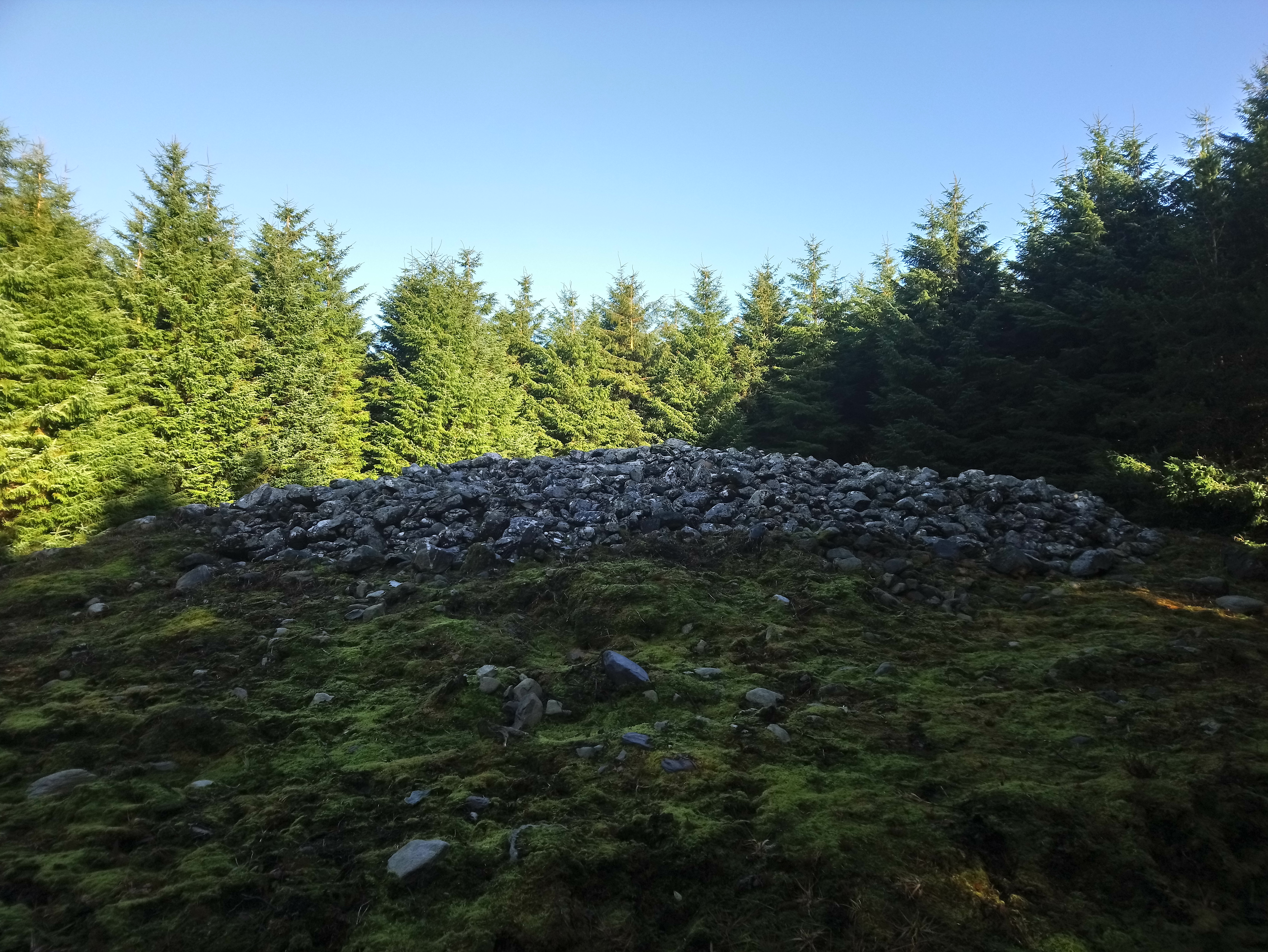
- Western side of the Skeagh Cairn

- Location within Ireland
- 51.574754°N 9.338472°W
- Type: Cairn
- Location: Skeagh, Skibbereen, County Cork, Ireland

History
- Built: c. 3000 BC

Site notes
- Material: Stone
- Height: 2 m (6 ft 7 in)
- Length: 19 m (62 ft)

National monument of Ireland
- Official name: Skeagh
- Reference no.: 580

The Skeagh Cairn is a cairn and ring barrow and National Monument located in County Cork, Ireland. It is located 5.8 km (3.6 mi) northwest of Skibbereen. A ring barrow is located 20 m (70 ft) to the north. It is a large flat-topped cairn 19 m (62 ft) across and 2 m (6 ft 7 in) high.

The cairn is believed to date to the Neolithic period. Festivals formerly took place here at midwinter.
