= Ardskeagh Church =

- Teampall Ard Scéithe
- Location within Ireland
- 52.331832°N 8.627986°W
- Location: Ardskeagh, County Cork
- Country: Ireland
- Denomination: Catholic (pre-Reformation)

History
- Dedication: Saint Michael

Architecture
- Functional status: ruined
- Style: Romanesque
- Years built: 12th century AD

Specifications
- Length: 14 m (46 ft)
- Width: 9 m (30 ft)
- Materials: stone, mortar

Administration
- Diocese: Cloyne

National monument of Ireland
- Official name: Ardskeagh
- Reference no.: 314

Ardskeagh Church is a medieval church and a National Monument in County Cork, Ireland.

== Location ==
The church is located 4.4 kilometres (2.7 mi) southeast of Charleville, to the south of the River Awbeg.

== History ==
Local history claims that it is named for Saint Sciath, a virgin saint who founded a convent here in AD 550. The present stone church was built in the 12th century and dedicated to Saint Michael; it appears in the Papal Taxation of 1302. By 1591 it was abandoned. The church is currently in state guardianship as a National Monument.

== Architecture ==
The doorway is round-headed, with arch crudely repaired. There is plain, square moulding.
