= Knockanillaun =

Townland near Ballina, County Mayo, Ireland

Coordinates: 54°07′09″N 9°12′36″W

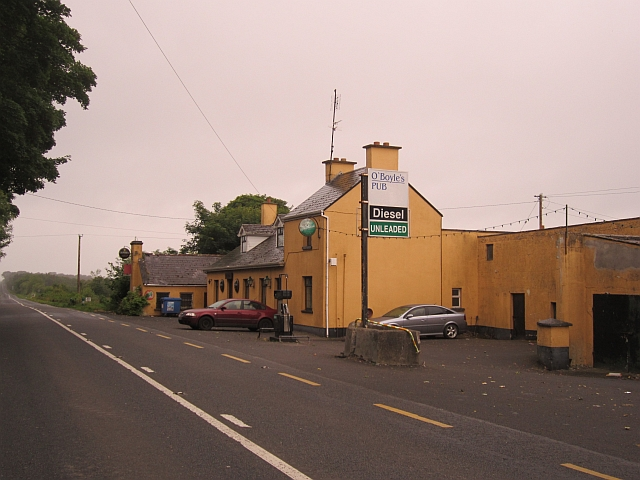
O'Boyles pub in Ballymanagh townland near Knockanillaun

Knockanillaun (Irish: Cnoc an Oileáin) is a small townland in the civil parish of Ardagh and the historical barony of Tirawley, County Mayo in Ireland. The townland, which is approximately 0.3 square miles (0.8 km^{2}) in area, had a population of 70 people in 26 houses as of the 2011 census.
