= Island Wedge Tomb =

- Tuama Dingeach an Oileáin (Irish)
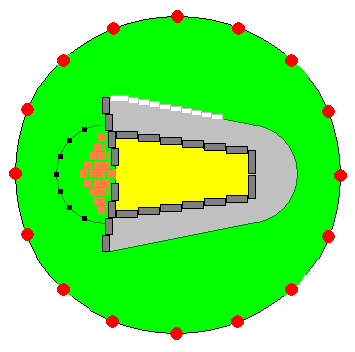
- Plan of the Island Wedge Tomb

- Location within Ireland
- 52.0677°N 8.5796°W
- Type: wedge-shaped gallery grave
- Location: Island, Mallow, County Cork, Ireland

History
- Built: c. 2500 BC

National monument of Ireland
- Official name: Island
- Reference no.: 502

The Island Wedge Tomb is a wedge-shaped gallery grave and National Monument located southeast of Mallow in County Cork, Ireland.

== Location ==
The Island Wedge Tomb is located 9.3 km (5.8 mi) southeast of Mallow.

== History ==
Wedge tombs of this kind were built in Ireland in the late Neolithic and early Bronze Age, c. 2500–2000 BC. Carbon-14 dating indicated activity in the time range of 1412–1308 BC and suggested that the gallery and outer wall were constructed in Early Bronze Age, with later enhancements. Evidence of cremated burial was found in several areas of the main chamber, as well as worked flint and scrapers. Also found were a spindle whorl and two glass beads. Three lots of cremated bone were found in the chamber but two were too small for meaningful interpretation. The third, in a pit towards the rear, was probably a 60-70-year-old female.

The tomb was excavated and partially restored in 1957. Some cremated bones were found during the excavation, located towards the end of the gallery.

== Description ==
The gallery of this tomb is oriented SW–NE. It is divided into a portico and main chamber enclosed in a U-shaped outer wall surrounded by an oval cairn measuring 11.5 m (38 ft) long by 9.7 m (32 ft) wide. It has double walls and an entrance marked with two large orthostats.

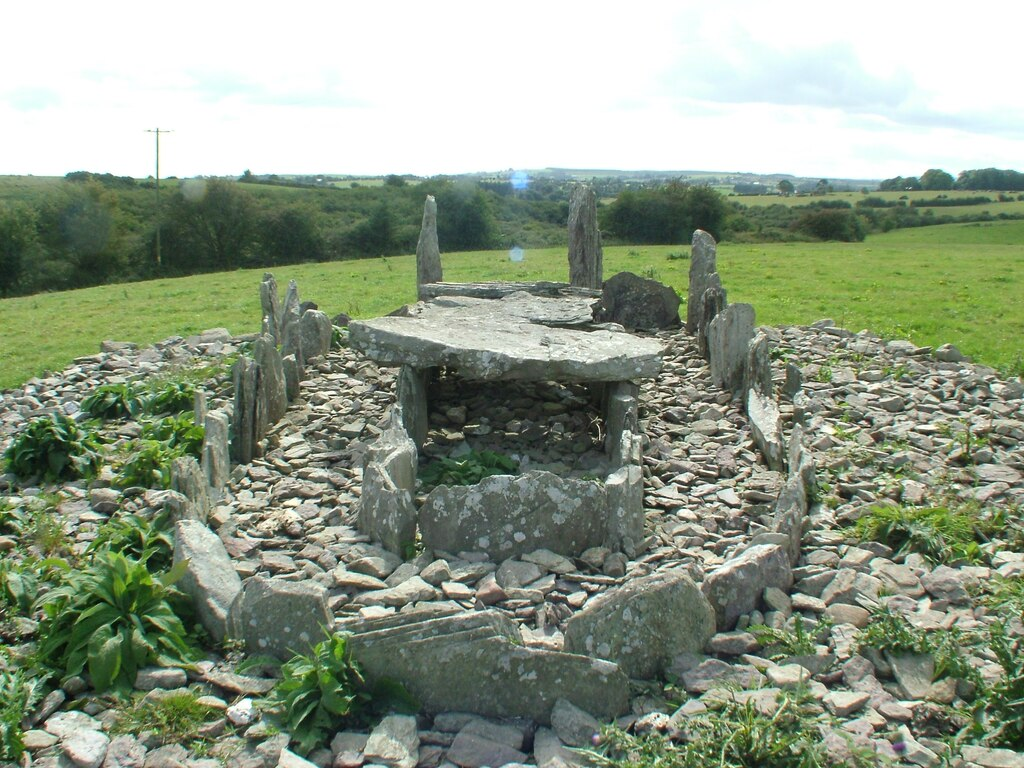
Island Wedge Tomb
