= Knockdrum Stone Fort =

Circular stone ringfort in County Cork, Ireland

Coordinates: 51.5265°N 9.1937°W

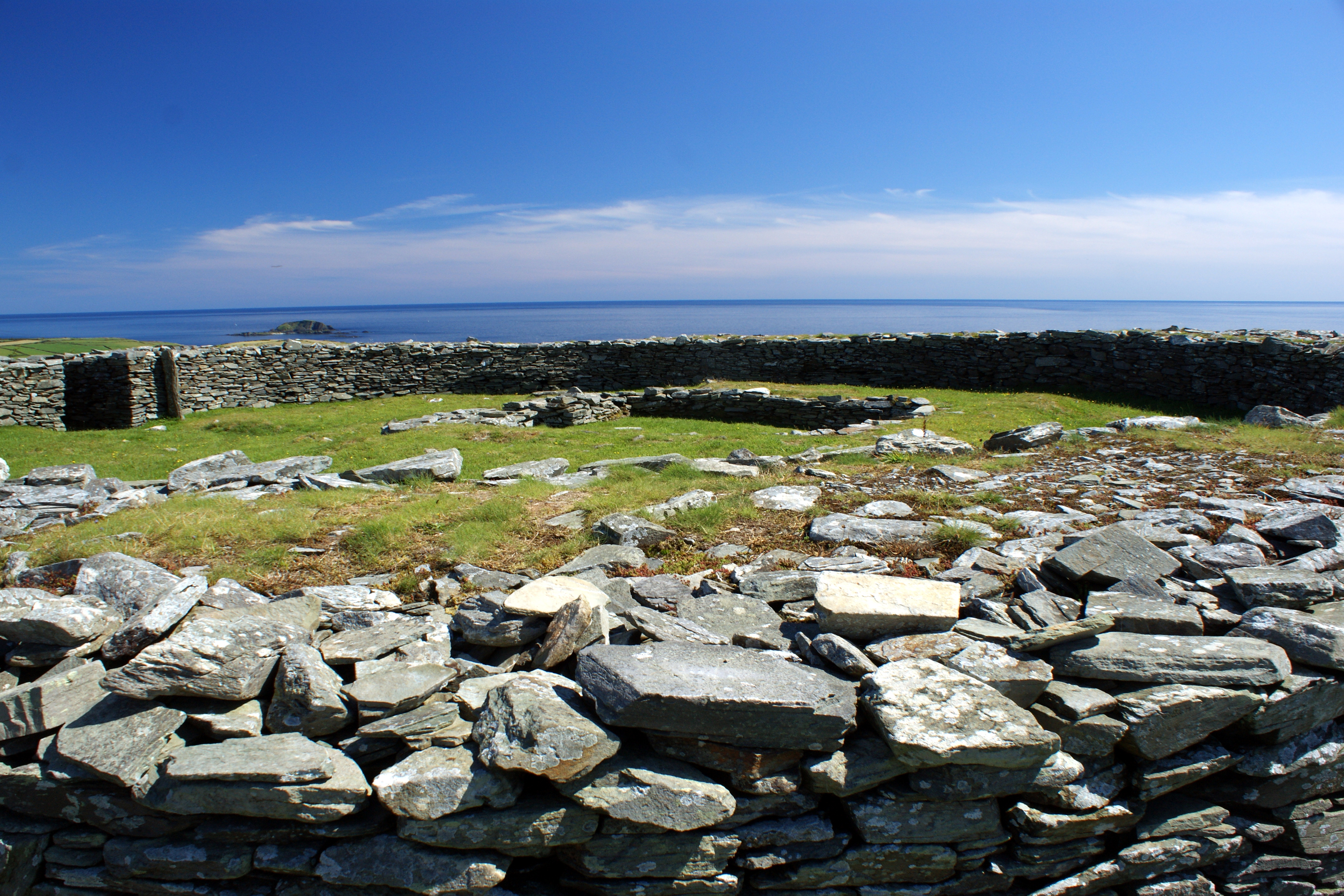
- Knockdrum with a view of the sea
- Interactive map of Knockdrum Stone Fort

National monument of Ireland
- Official name: Knockdrum Stone Fort
- Reference no.: 284

Knockdrum Stone Fort is a circular stone rath, ringfort, or hilltop fort near Castletownshend in County Cork, Ireland. It was restored before 1860, and there were archaeological excavations from 1930–31. The three-metre thick walls are reported as either 2 metres or 1.75 metres high depending on the source, and as 29 metres in diameter. The site is owned by the Irish Government which has declared it a national monument.

Inside the fort are the stone foundations of a rectangular building with a souterrain, a type of structure characteristic of the European Iron Age, but often of later date in Ireland. There are cup marks both inside and outside the wall.
