= Ballindangan =

Village in County Cork, Ireland

Ballindangan Baile an Daingin
- Village
- Location in Ireland
- Coordinates: 52.237725°N 8.341187°W
- Country: Ireland
- Province: Munster
- County: Cork

Ballindangan (from Irish Baile an Daingin) is a village in County Cork in Ireland. It has a handball alley, a Roman Catholic church (Church of the Immaculate Conception), a primary school (Ballindangan National School), and a community centre. Its railway station was closed in 1947.

Located to the south is Kileenemer Church which is a ruined medieval church and national monument.

Ballindangan is within the Cork East Dáil constituency, and lies in the ecclesiastical parish of Glanworth, Ballindangan and Curraghagalla.
