= William Hill =

William Hill may refer to:

== People ==
=== In government and politics ===
- Bill Hill (Alaska politician), American political candidate
- William Hill (Australian politician) (1866–1939), long-serving member of the Australian House of Representatives
- William Hill (colonial administrator) (fl. 1630s), British colonial Proprietary Governor of the Province of Avalon, Newfoundland
- William Hill (Iowa politician) (1930–2021), American politician in the state of Iowa
- William Hill (New South Wales politician) (1838–1919), member of the New South Wales Legislative Council
- William Hill (Wisconsin politician) (fl. 1840s), member of the Wisconsin State Assembly
- William A. Hill (1864–1932), American judge in Colorado
- William C. Hill (1917–1998), Vermont attorney and judge
- William D. Hill (1833–1906), American politician; U.S. representative from Ohio
- William Davison Hill (1860–1944), farmer and political figure in Nova Scotia, Canada
- W. D. Hill (William Duguid Hill, 1858–1921), mayor of Ballarat, Victoria, Australia
- William H. Hill (diplomat) (fl. 1980s–2020s), American historian and diplomat
- William Henry Hill (New York politician) (1876–1972), American politician; U.S. representative from New York
- William Henry Hill (North Carolina politician) (1767–1809), American politician; U.S. representative from North Carolina
- William J. Hill (1840–1918), American newspaper publisher, state senator, and mayor
- William James Hill (1854–1922), Ontario construction contractor and political figure
- William Luther Hill (1873–1951), American politician; U.S. senator from Florida
- William Noel-Hill, 3rd Baron Berwick (1773–1842), British peer
- William S. Hill (1886–1972), American politician; U.S. representative from Colorado
- William U. Hill (born 1948), justice of the Wyoming Supreme Court

=== In military ===
- William Lee Hill (1920–1981), Tuskegee airman
- William Lowell Hill (1855–1922), USN, U.S. Medal of Honor recipient
- William P. T. Hill (1895–1965), United States Marine Corps general

=== In science ===
- William Charles Osman Hill (1901–1975), British anatomist and primatologist
- Bill Hill (geneticist) (1940–2021), population geneticist

=== In sport ===
- William Hill (British athlete) (1896–1958), British track and field athlete
- William Hill (Hong Kong athlete) (1945–2020), Hong Kong track and field athlete
- Bill Hill (baseball) (1874–1938), American Major League Baseball pitcher
- Will Hill (born 1990), American football player
- Will Hill (defensive back, born 1963), American football player
- Bill Hill (American football) (born 1959), American football cornerback
- Bill Hill (Canadian football) (1936–2020), American-born Canadian football player
- Bill Hill (ice hockey) (1885–1969), Canadian ice hockey player
- William Hill (footballer, born 1920) (1920–1999), English footballer
- Billy Hill (footballer) (born 1936), also known as Bill Hill, English footballer

=== In other fields ===
- William Hill (blacksmith) (fl. 1530s–1540s), Scottish ironworker at the court of James V
- William Hill (businessman) (1903–1971), founder of William Hill bookmakers
- William Hill (English architect) (1827–1889)
- William Hill (Irish architect) (1798–1844)
- William Henry Hill Sr (1837–1911), Irish architect
- William Henry Hill Jr (1867–1941), his son, Irish architect
- William Ebsworth Hill (1817–1895), London violin maker and founder of the firm W. E. Hill & Sons
- William Ely Hill (1887–1962), American cartoonist and illustrator
- William Lair Hill (1838–1924), American attorney, historian, and newspaper editor
- William "Red" Hill Sr. (1888–1942), Canadian rescuer and Niagara Falls daredevil
- Billy Hill (gangster) (1911–1984), London mobster also known as William Hill
- Billy Hill (songwriter) (William Joseph Hill, 1899–1940), American songwriter, violinist, and pianist
- Billie Ritchie (born William Hill; 1878–1921), Scottish comedian

== Other uses ==
- William Hill Estates, a winery owned by E & J Gallo Winery in Napa Valley, California
- William Hill (bookmaker), a major chain of bookmakers in Britain; now a subsidiary of 888 Holdings
- William Hill (This Is Us), a fictional character on the U.S. TV series This Is Us
- William Hill & Son (fl. 1800s), English organ maker
- W. E. Hill & Sons (1880–1992), London luthier, antique string instruments and bow dealer
- William Hill Sports Book of the Year, an annual British book award given British bookmakers William Hill plc
- William Hill, a fictional sergeant played by Paul Giamatti in the 1998 film Saving Private Ryan

== See also ==
- Billy Hill (disambiguation)
- Willie Hill (born 1951), American Anglican bishop
