= Montenotte =

Montenotte may refer to:

== Italy ==
- Cairo Montenotte
- Montenotte Department

== Ireland ==
- Montenotte, Cork
- The Montenotte Hotel
