= Scots Presbyterian Church =

Scots Presbyterian Church may refer to multiple churches:

- Scots Church, Cobh
- Scots Presbyterian Church, Albany
- Scots Presbyterian Church, Dublin
- Scots Presbyterian Church, Fremantle
- Scots Presbyterian Church, Kiama
- Scots Presbyterian Church, Melbourne

== See also ==
- Scots Church (disambiguation)
