= Irish Hobby =

Extinct breed of pony

The Irish Hobby is an extinct breed of horse developed in Ireland prior to the 13th century. The breed provided foundation bloodlines for several modern horse breeds, including breeds as diverse as the Connemara pony and the Irish Draught. Palfreys were known as haubini in France, which eventually became hobbeye. These animals eventually found their way to Ireland where the Irish Hobby developed.

The breed was mentioned in 1375 by the poet John Barbour, who called them hobynis in his poem, The Bruce. He also mentioned them in his work Reliquiae Antiquae, noting their speed.

And one amang, an Iyrysch man,
Uppone his hoby swyftly ran...

Mares of Irish Hobby breeding may have been among the native horse breeds of Ireland that provided foundation stock for the Thoroughbred. There is a great deal of evidence that the Irish Hobby was imported to England and Scotland for various activities, including racing, "...they be so light and swift." Horses were traded in Ireland at the Cahirmee Horse Fair near the town of Buttevant, reputed to be one of the oldest horse fairs, since medieval times.

This quick and agile horse was also popular for skirmishing, and was often ridden by light cavalry known as Hobelars. Hobbies were used successfully by both sides during the Wars of Scottish Independence, with Edward I of England trying to gain advantage by preventing Irish exports of the horses to Scotland. Robert Bruce employed the hobby for his guerrilla warfare and mounted raids, covering 60 to 70 miles (97 to 113 km) a day.

The breed is the origin of the term hobby horse. A common Irish phrase associated with the term is "go get on your hobby horse", which is an idiom to complain about a subject, topic, or issue in which one is excessively interested.
