= John Quarry =

John Quarry was Archdeacon of Cork from 1894 until 1899.

Quarry was born in County Cork and educated at Trinity College, Dublin. He was ordained in 1833 and began his career with a curacy at Shandon, Cork. He held incumbencies at Kilaughnabeg, Kilmacabea, Kilgarriff, Desertmore and Midleton.
