= Montenotte, Cork =

Suburb of Cork city, Ireland

Montenotte
- Suburb
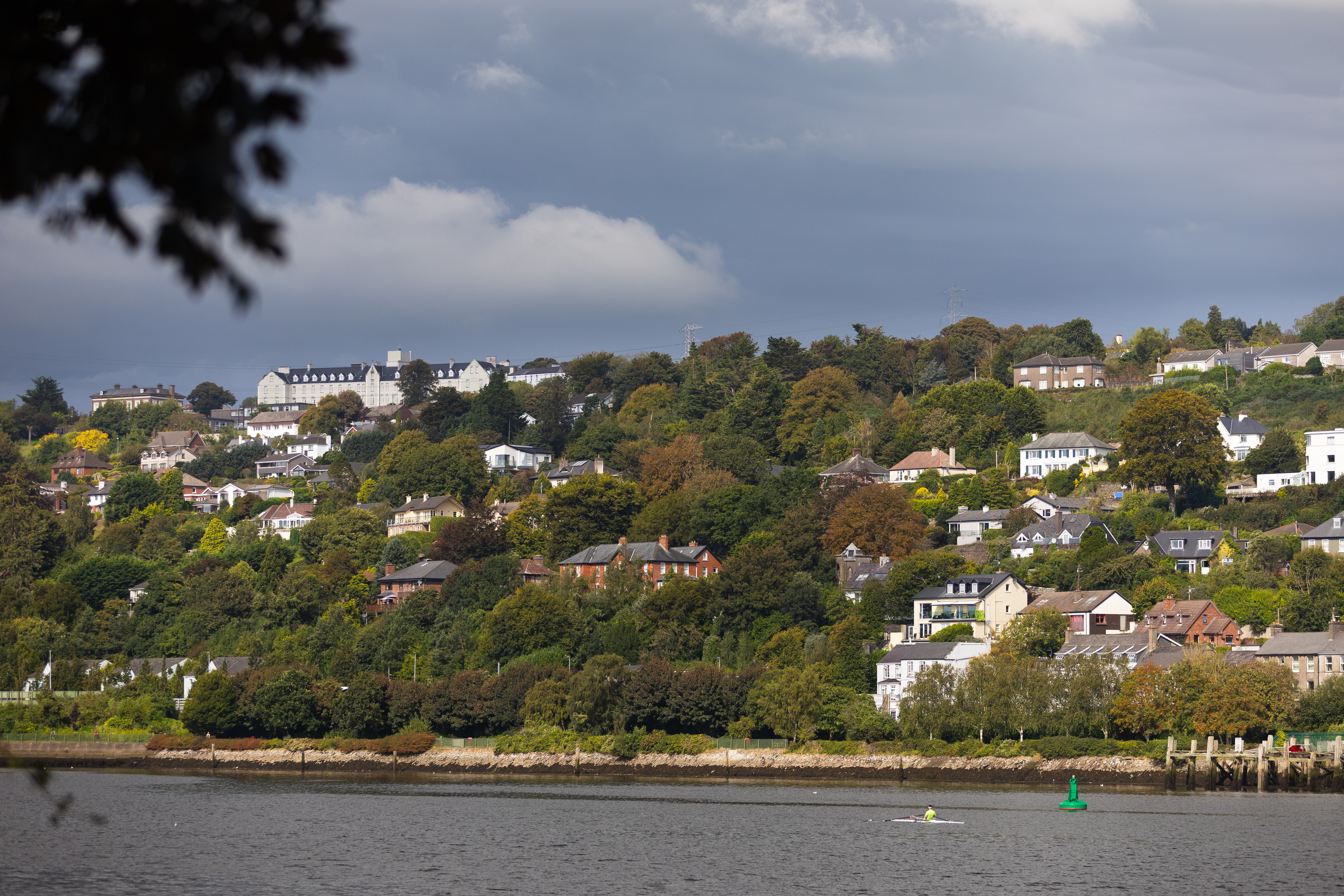
- Montenotte as seen from the opposite (south) side of the River Lee

- Location in Ireland
- Coordinates: 51°54′21″N 08°26′35″W
- Country: Ireland
- Province: Munster
- County: County Cork
- Time zone: UTC+0 (WET)
  - Summer (DST): UTC-1 (IST (WEST))
- Eircode: T23
- Area code: 021

Montenotte is an area in the northeast of Cork City, Ireland, which was home to merchants and a prosperous middle class from the early to mid-19th century. It was named after the late 18th century Napoleonic battle, the Battle of Montenotte, which took place in Northern Italy. The suburb comprises two electoral districts (Montenotte A and Montenotte B) within the Dáil constituency of Cork North-Central. As of 2002, the populations of these electoral districts were 1,853 and 2,723 respectively.

== Development ==
Montenotte is situated on a hill facing south over the River Lee adjacent to the St Luke's area (near St Luke's church). Originally home to several substantial residences, some of these large homes were later converted for institutional or commercial uses.

The river-facing area of Montenotte has significant mature tree coverage. During the 20th century, lands were sold for private housing development, and the tree-covered hillside is dotted with low-density modern housing overlooking the River Lee.

Local businesses include the Montenotte Hotel.
