= Liscarroll =

Village in County Cork, Ireland

Liscarroll Irish: Lios Cearúill
- Village
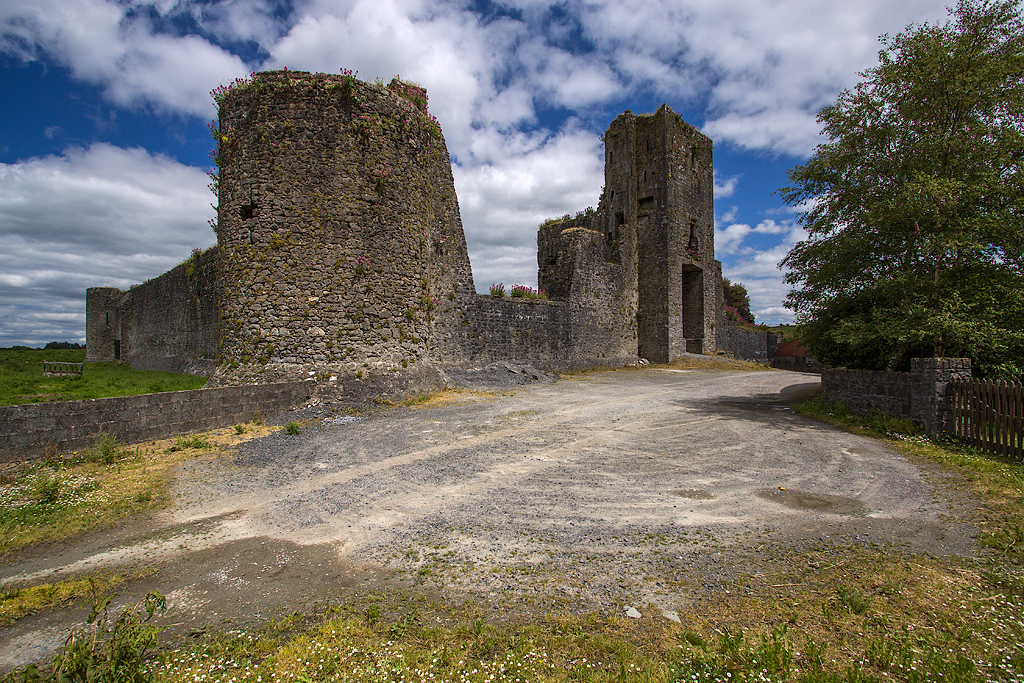
- Liscarroll Castle overlooks the village

- Location in Ireland
- Coordinates: 52°15′37.15″N 08°48′13.25″W
- Country: Ireland
- Province: Munster
- County: County Cork

Population (2022)
  - Total: 245
- Time zone: UTC+0 (WET)
  - Summer (DST): UTC-1 (IST (WEST))

Liscarroll (Irish: Lios Cearúill, meaning 'Carroll's ringfort') is a village in County Cork, Ireland. The village is on the R522 regional road near Mallow and Buttevant, about two miles south of River Awbeg. Liscarroll is within the Cork North-West. Approximately 50 km (30 mi) from both Cork City and Limerick, Liscarroll was once considered to be the cross roads of Munster. The village is in a townland and civil parish of the same name.

== Liscarroll Castle ==
The remains of Liscarroll Castle, a large 13th-century Hiberno-Norman fortress, that still towers over the village of Liscarroll and the surrounding countryside. It is the third largest castle in Ireland.

The construction date of Liscarroll castle is not recorded, but a late thirteenth-century date is most likely for this type of castle. It may well have been built by David de Barry who died in the late 1270s and who had served as justiciar (the king's chief representative in Ireland) in the 1260s. Liscarroll was held by the Barrys down to the early seventeenth century, when it was acquired by an English settler, Percival.

In 1649 it was captured by Cromwellian forces under Sir Hardress Waller. A sustained artillery bombardment during this battle caused considerable damage to the walls, making it indefensible, a fate suffered by many castles when cannon came into common usage. Percivals regained possession of the castle after this and their descendants held it down to the twentieth century.

The castle is the subject of an 1854 poem by Callaghan Hartstonge Gayner which concludes:

Beneath its folds assemble now, and fight with might and main,
That grand old fight to make our land "A nation once again",
And falter not till alien rule in dark oblivion falls,
We’ll stand as freemen yet, beneath those old Liscarroll walls.

In 1920 during the Irish War of Independence the castle was temporarily occupied by the British military.

The Castle is under the guardianship of the Office of Public Works as a National Monument.

== Other notable locations ==
There is a ringfort close to the village, approximately 30 metres (98 ft) in diameter which dates to between the fifth and tenth century. It is the burial place of almost twenty members of the FitzGerald/FitzPierce family killed in the Battle of Liscarroll in 1642.

There are two donkey sanctuaries in the area, the Donkey Sanctuary and the Jones' household.

Liscarroll nestles in a valley surrounded by hills and this valley was once part of an ancient lake, which now lies approximately 60 ft underground.

== See also ==
- List of towns and villages in Ireland
- Battle of Liscarroll
