= Billy Hill =

Billy Hill may refer to:

- Billy Hill (band), an American country music group active from 1989 to 1990
- Billy Hill (gangster) (1911–1984), British gangster and criminal mastermind
- Billy Hill (songwriter) (1899–1940), American songwriter and lyricist
- Billy Hill (footballer) (born 1936), English footballer
- Billy Hill and the Hillbillies, a musical/variety group at Disneyland in Anaheim, California between 1992 and 2014

== See also ==
- Billy Hillenbrand (1922–1994), American football halfback
- William Hill (disambiguation)
- Hill (surname)
