= St Lappan's Church, Little Island =

Anglican church in Cork, Ireland

St Lappan's Church
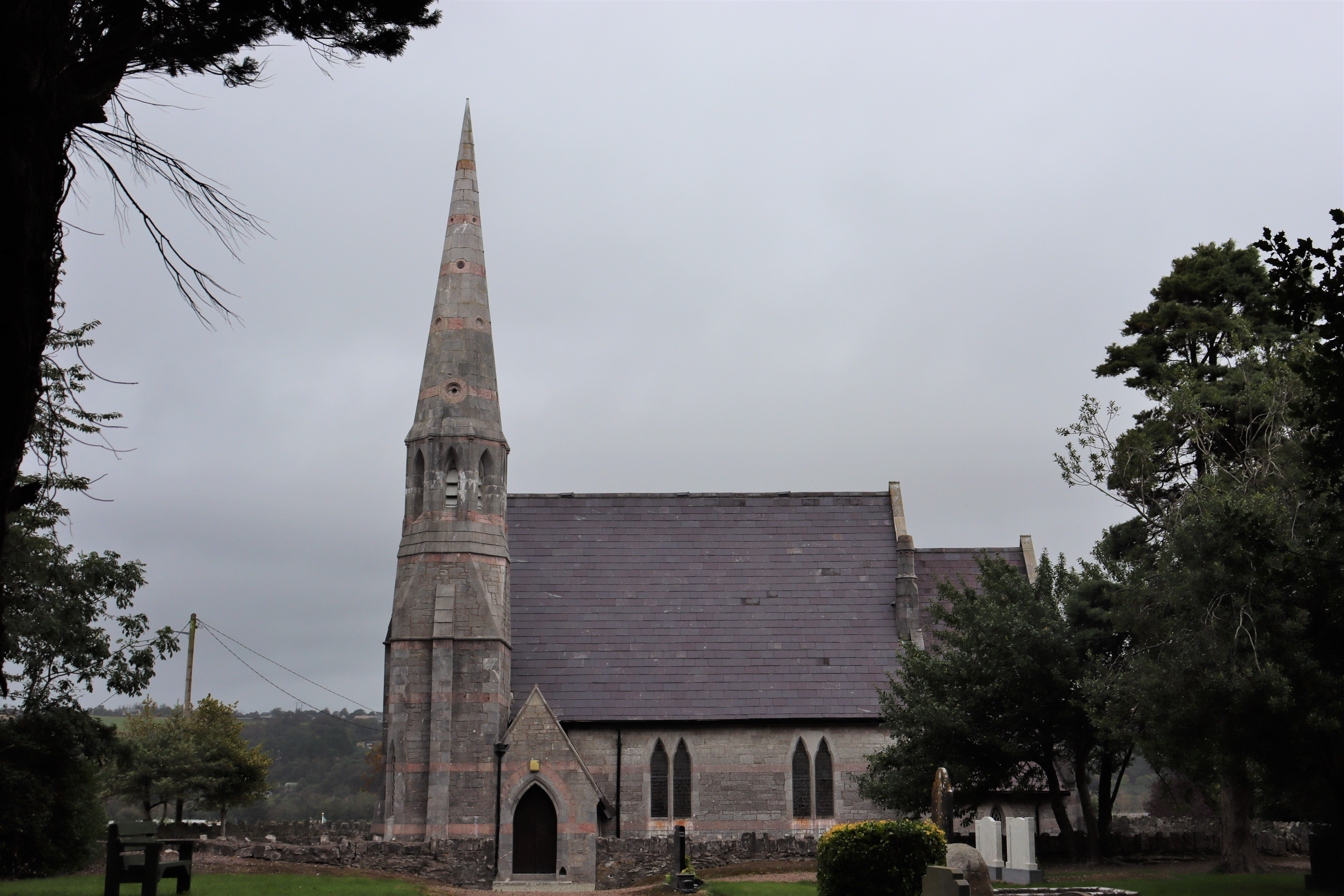
- St Lappan's Church
- 51.9014°N 8.3529°W
- Country: Ireland
- Denomination: Church of Ireland

Architecture
- Architect(s): Welland & Gillespie; Henry Hill (supint.)
- Completed: 1866

St Lappan's Church is a small Gothic Revival Anglican church located in Little Island, County Cork, Ireland. It was completed in 1866 and is dedicated to Saint Lappan of Cork. It is within the Cobh and Glanmire Union of the Church of Ireland Diocese of Cork, Cloyne and Ross.

== History ==
Built between 1864 and 1866, St Lappan's Church was funded in part by a bequest from a Miss Hester Bury.

It was built close to an earlier church and graveyard, known in some sources as "St Lappan's Churchyard", which had been in ruins since at least the early 19th century.

== Architecture ==
The building was designed by Welland & Gillespie under the superintendence of Henry Hill. The church is made of limestone, and features a prominent spire. The church is built in the Gothic Revival style. The church features several stained-glass lancet windows.

== See also ==
- Saint Lappan
