= Cahirmee Horse Fair =

Fair in Buttevant, County Cork, Ireland

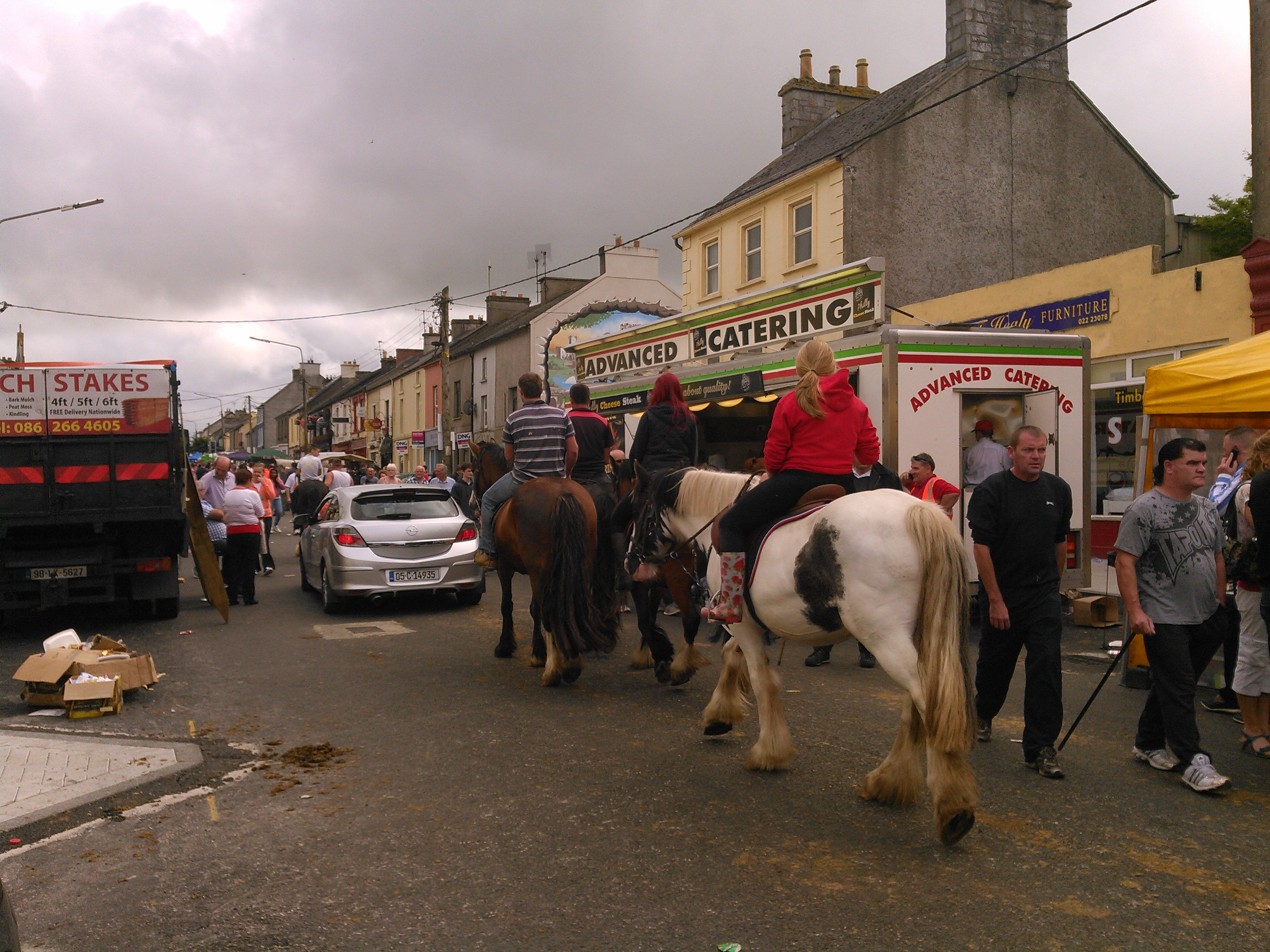
Horseback riding at the Cahirmee Horse Fair (2015)

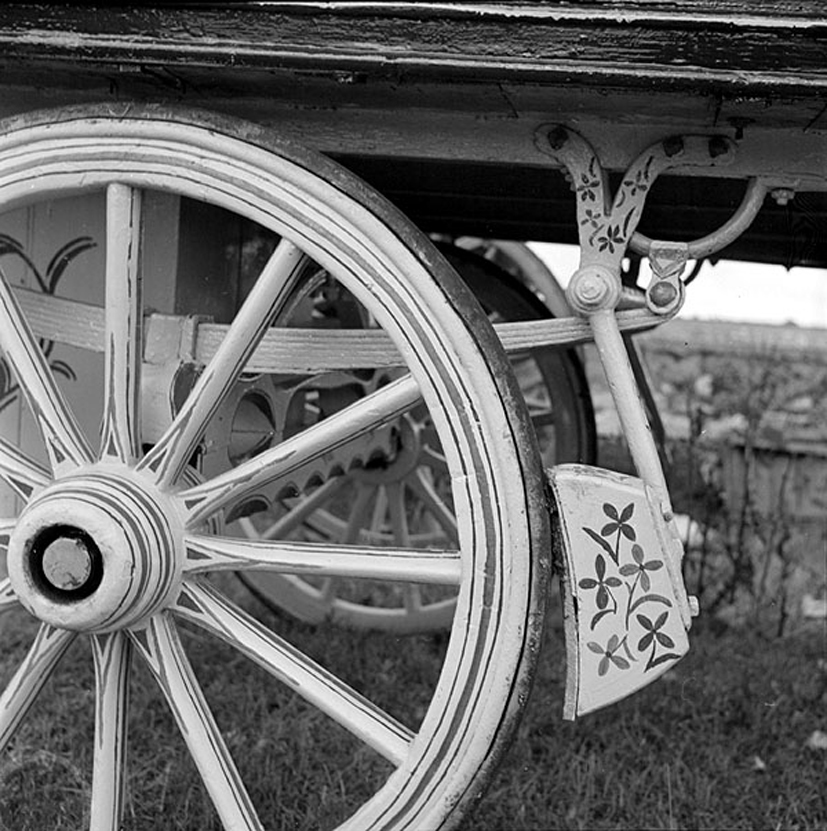
Decorative wheel and brake of a Mincéirí caravan headed for the Cahirmee Horse Fair (1954)

Cahirmee Horse Fair is held on 12 July every year (except 1915–1918, 1940–1945 & 2020-2021) in the town of Buttevant, County Cork, Ireland.

The ancient horse fair was originally held at the Fair Field of Cahirmee, some two miles to the east of the town. In 1921 it was transferred into the town and is still held in the month of July each year.

M. P. Linehan in My Heart Remembers How notes the following:

Cahirmee fair has a history, but I fear it is history that has never been written, or written so long ago that it has been lost. I have told already how the fair green straddles a hill under which Boherbwee, 'the yellow road' of Manaan MacLir's cows, passes; how it looks across to the bloody battlefield of Cnocanaar; how it is crowned with a mighty lios which is credited with being the burial ground of the Fianna. It was part of the ancient parish of Cahirduggan in the still more ancient Barony of Fermuighe.
I have pointed out that a few miles to the north-east is Rossach, traditionally the burial ground of the Kings of Fermuighe. Was Cahirmee the stone fort of these same kings and is "mee" in Cahirmee the same word as "moy" in Fermoy? Duggan is supposed to have been a direct descendant of Mogh Ruith and a Duggan, King of Fermoy, was one of Brian Boru's lieutenants to be killed at the battle of Clontarf. O'Duggan held that kingship until he was ousted from it by the Eoganacht O'Keeffes.
We know that the old Irish Aonach began as funeral games when the heroes of a battle were buried, and that horse-racing was a feature of these games; that the games tended to become annual events at which courts of justice were held and laws enacted embodying the traditional customs of the clan or sept or petty kingdom; that at them marriages were solemnised and goods exchanged and bartered.
Did Cahirmee Fair begin in the halcyon day when the victims of the bloody contest of Cnocanaar were laid to rest on the brow overlooking the valley of the Awbeg? It would be plausible to give an affirmative answer. Perhaps that answer will be verified some day when our archaeologists will dig into and examine Mee's Cahir.
It is also worth remembering that in pre-Christian Ireland the last days of July were great days of hill pilgrimages and that changes in the calendar might well mean that Cahirmee Fair once fell at the end, and not in the middle, of the seventh month. However, there is no doubt that this fair was a recognised institution prior to the Cromwellian Wars, because references to the Fair Field of Cahirmee are to be found in ancient documents dating from the reign of Charles II.

It would be interesting, if one could, to trace the history of many of the young colts and fillies that started out on their career of fame when they were brought to the fair-field of Cahirmee. One at least of them has achieved immortality, for he served as the throne from which a great captain-general brought a continent to his feet. He is the white charger Marengo, which Napoleon is shown as riding in Meissonier's masterpiece The Retreat from Moscow.

Coincidentally, the Duke of Wellington's horse at the Battle of Waterloo, an Irish black named Copenhagen, was also purchased at Cahirmee.

== 2020 COVID-19 pandemic ==
Due to the COVID-19 pandemic the Garda Síochána and council officials have held meetings in order to prevent the fair happening in July 2020. Councillor Ian Doyle, Mayor of County Cork, said that it was likely the council would have to put up barriers. He also said that the council would contact the various horse organisations to ask them not to support the 2020 fair. He said that by the date of the fair the expected travel limit would be 20km and that the majority of those attending would come from much further away. He said that the Charleville Agricultural Show and Mallow Garden Festival had been cancelled on safety grounds. Normally the fair attracts thousands of people.

There were other cancellations in 1915–18 & 1940–45.
