= Ballybeg Priory =

Ruined priory in Cork, Ireland

Coordinates: 52°13′10″N 8°40′12″W

- Prióireacht an Bhaile Bhig
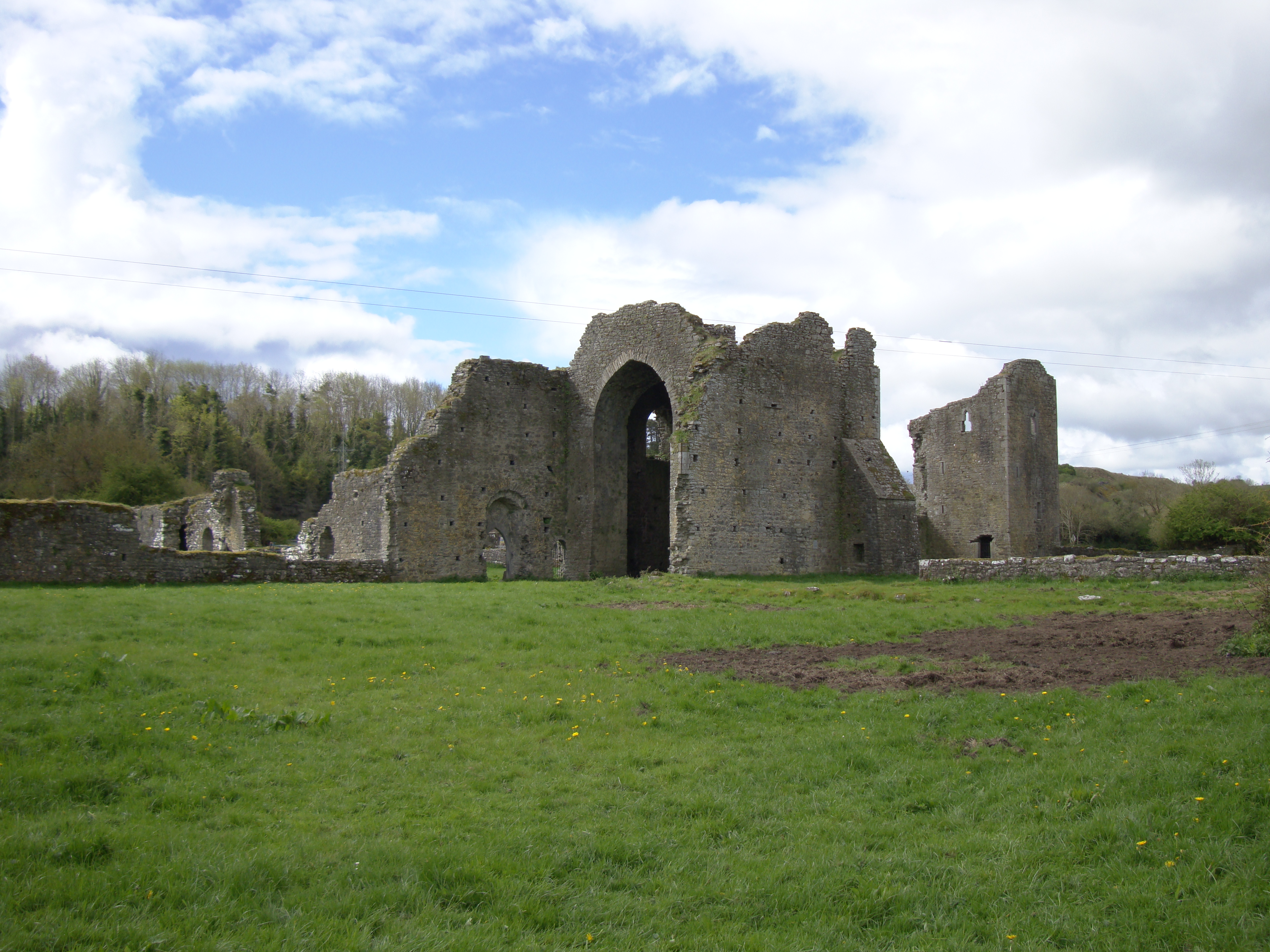
- Ballybeg Priory in 2010

Monastery information
- Order: Augustinian
- Established: 1229
- Dedicated to: Thomas Becket

National monument of Ireland
- Official name: Ballybeg Abbey
- Reference no.: 301

Ballybeg Priory (Irish: Prióireacht an Bhaile Bhig), also known as Ballybeg Abbey, the Abbey of St Thomas, and St Thomas's Priory, is a 13th-century priory of the Augustinian order near the town of Buttevant, County Cork, Ireland. It is home to one of the best preserved and most substantial dovecots in Ireland. The priory was founded in 1229 and dissolved in 1541, the land and buildings passing into private hands. Those parts of the buildings that have escaped from the stone being removed for use in other buildings are mostly late medieval.

Along with Bridgetown Priory near Castletownroche, Ballybeg priory is one of only two substantial Augustinian monasteries in County Cork.

The abbey, dovecot, and nearby tower known both as Ballybeg Castle and as Ballybeg Tower, are collectively considered a National Monument in State Care (#301).

== History ==
The priory was founded by either Philip de Barry or his son William in 1229. It is dedicated to Saint Thomas Becket, and was granted to the Canons Regular of St. Augustine. An equestrian statue of de Barry reportedly once stood in the church, in memory of his foundation. William's son, Philip's grandson, David Óg de Barry (the first Baron Barry), enlarged the revenues of the priory in either 1235, or 1251. The monks of Ballybeg were affluent: they had been granted 2,060 acres of land, and multiple rectories were appointed to them by means of advowson.

A residential tower was added in the mid-15th century.

Following dissolution in 1541, the abbey had various owners, before being acquired by the Jephson family in 1609. During this period, the priory's lands were farmed and tithes passed were passed to lay impropriators. Following this acquisition, much of the priory was quarried for stone, and the bell-tower was repurposed as a cow-byre.

According to Samuel Lewis, writing in 1837, a stone coffin had at some previous time been excavated from the ruins of the abbey, inside of which was a skeleton adorned with a cross and golden chains.

== Architecture ==
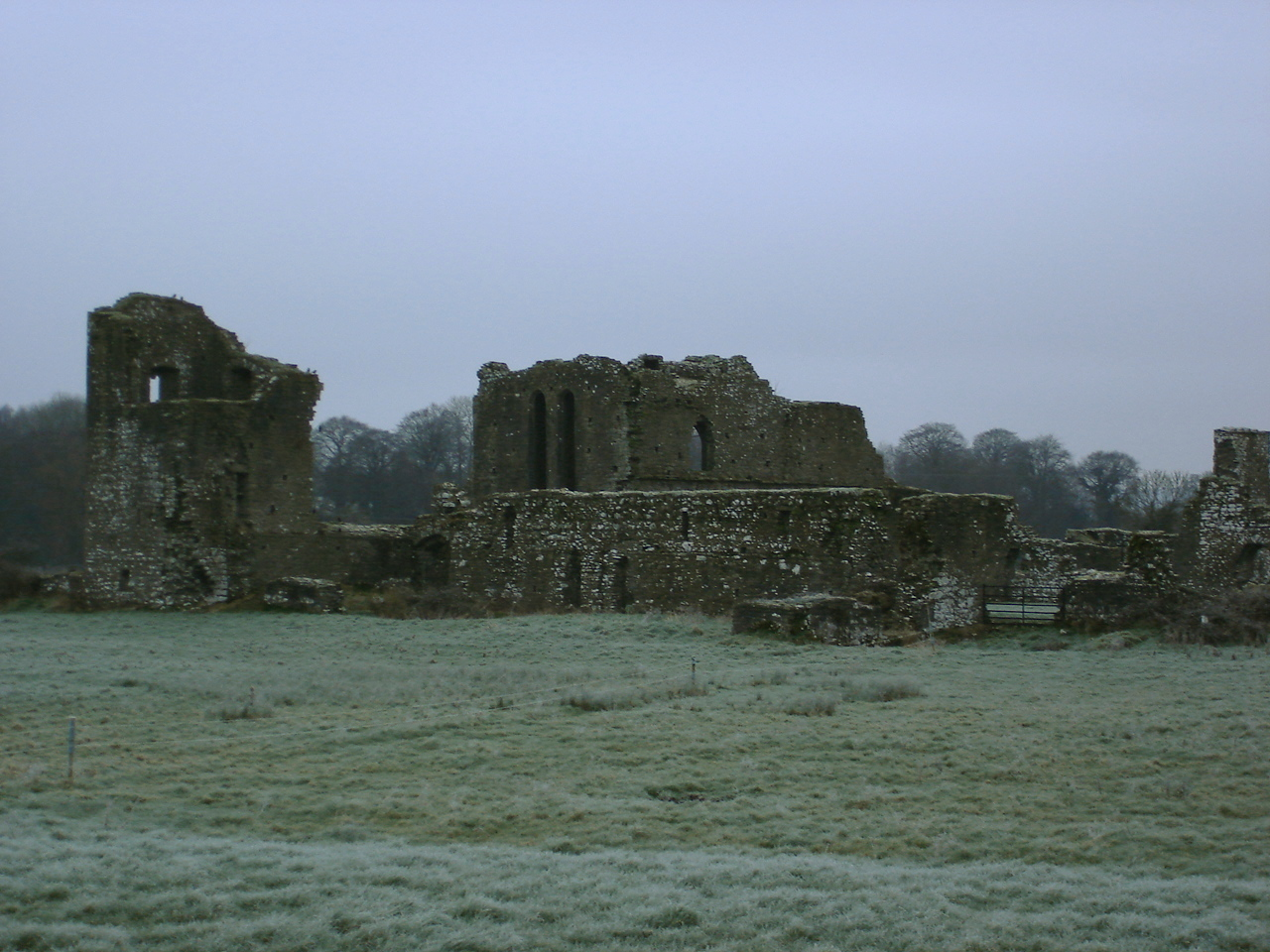
Ballybeg Priory

The monastery is built in the Early English Gothic style of architecture. Examples of "stiff-leaf" capital decoration can be found in the priory. The majority of the priory is in poor condition, and has been badly ruined, with the notable exception of the dovecot. A late-medieval tower stands to the north of the church. Though it is now a two-storey free-standing structure, it is thought to have once been taller and to have formed part of the original curtain walls, though its function remains unclear.

The priory's church was notably long, measuring some 166 feet (51 m) in length and 26 feet (7.9 m) in width. The cloister, situated on the south side of the church was 90 feet (27 m) square.

=== Dovecot ===
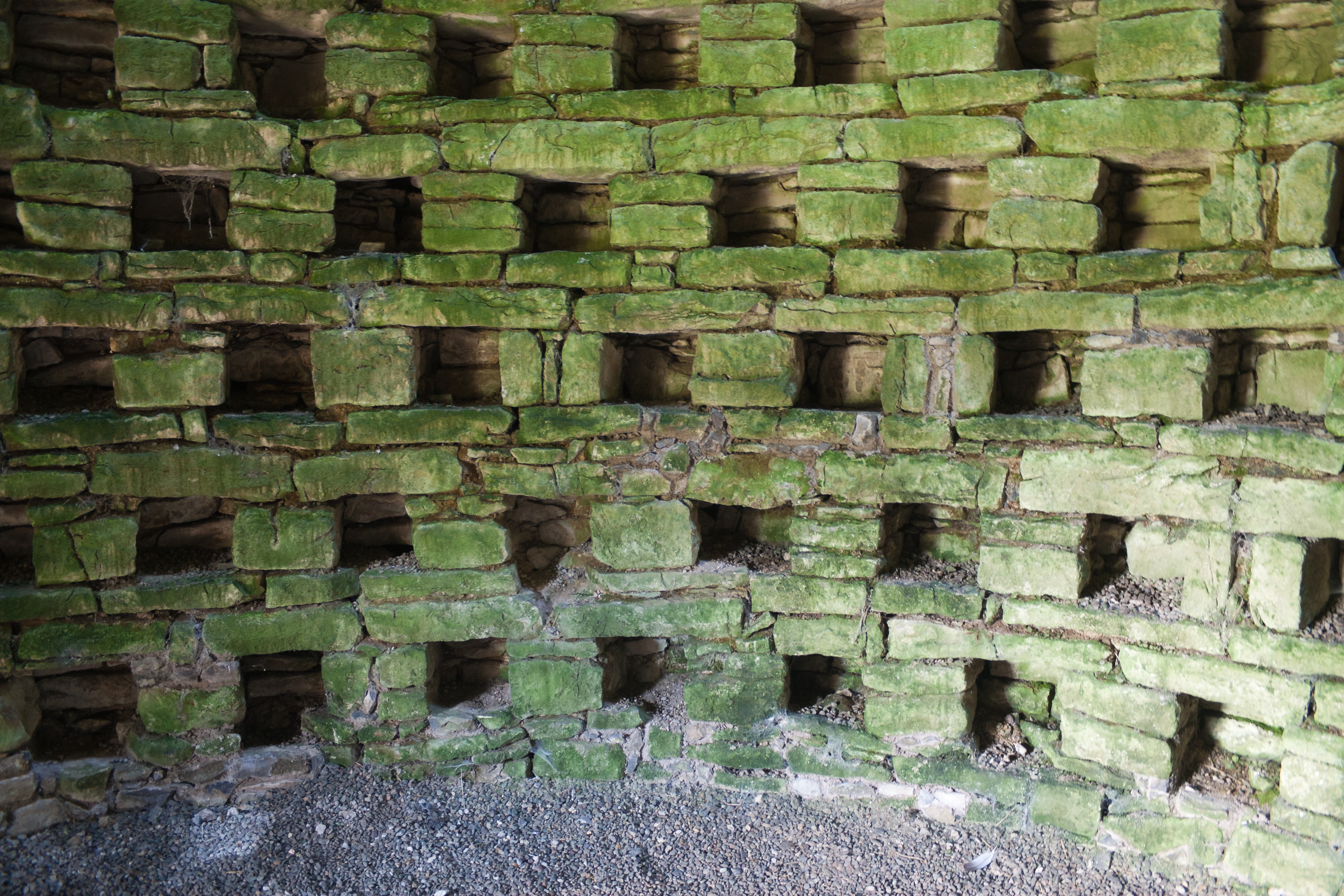
The interior wall of the dovecot

The priory complex incorporated a large dovecot (also known as a columbarium), which has been almost perfectly preserved. Located to the south east of the chancel, Frank Keohane describes it as "arguably the finest medieval dovecot surviving in Ireland." The inner walls of the dovecot are built in square compartments in regular tiers to a height of fifteen feet. There are three hundred and fifty two niches, divided into eleven tiers each containing thirty-two compartments. The tiers begin above ground level so as to allow for the collection of droppings and end well below the flight hole in the roof since doves will not perch near busily frequented exits. The columbarium at Ballybeg, is typically located away from the main priory buildings, and still conserves a string course around the circumference of the building which served not only as a structural strengthening of the building but also to prevent weasels, martens or other vermin from scaling the walls to the entrances. The columbarium's importance stemmed from its having been a source of revenue for the priory as its principal agricultural purpose was the production of fertiliser. Pigeon fertiliser (guano) was essential for herb gardens and economically more highly valued than equivalents produced by cattle, sheep or pigs. It was also a sine qua non for the successful growing of hemp which was widely used for cloth, rope and sack making.

Since pigeons could themselves be regarded as vermin and capable of wreaking damage on grain crops, columbaria were strictly controlled by medieval law. While tenants and others were permitted to keep a few pairs of doves in their roof-attics, a dovecot, such as that at Ballybeg, was the exclusive prerogative of the landowner who, in turn, was restricted to one nest per arpent, a medieval French measure of land equal to roughly an acre and a quarter. From this, we can infer that at the time of the construction of the truc at Ballybeg, the priory owned something in the region of four hundred and 40 acres (160,000 m^{2}) of land or four carucates. At the time of its dissolution, Ballybeg seems to have been in possession of less than two carucates of land which would have been insufficient to justify maintenance of a dovecot of such large dimensions.

In its original charter, Bridgetown Abbey, another house of the Augustinian Canons, founded by Alexander Fitz Hugh de Roche ante 1216, on the other hand, was allotted 13 carucates or one thousand five hundred and 60 acres (240,000 m^{2}), fish ponds, a third of the founder's mill, and the ecclesiastical benefices of his demesne. It does not appear to have had a dovecot or at least nothing has survived to indicate that it did.

=== Clapper bridge ===
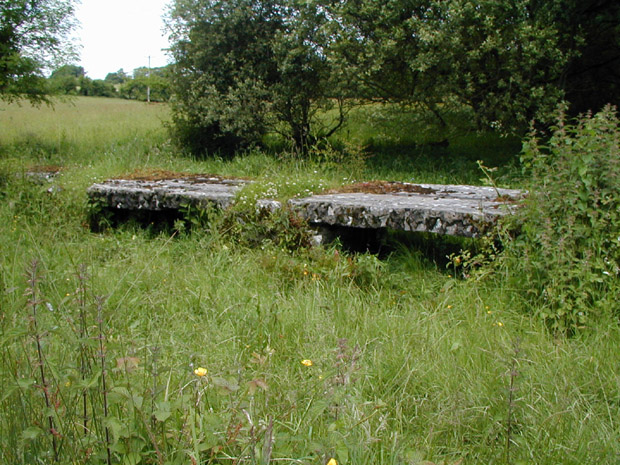
Remains of a clapper bridge on the Awbeg

The remains of a medieval clapper bridge, constructed by the monks in the 13th century, crosses the Awbeg in Springfield, relatively close to the monastery. In 1906 Walter Jones, writing for the Journal of the Cork Historical and Archaeological Society described it as the finest example of a clapper bridge in Ireland. In 1910 however, the Awbeg river was dredged and its course was altered. As part of these works half of the site was removed, and the bridge now runs over dry land. The bridge is composed of limestone slabs that are roughly ten feet long and quite thick, each weighing over an imperial tonne. A sarcophagus, supposedly containing the remains of one of the friars, was found in a tomb near the bridge in 1898.

== Significance ==
By comparing the Ballybeg dovecot with other surviving examples in Ireland, it is possible to gauge the importance of the priory in relation to other contemporary religious houses: the dovecot attached to the Trinitarian priory in Adare, County Limerick, for example, is much smaller, indicating a religious house of proportions a good deal more modest than those of Ballybeg. In France, the medieval ordinances concerning dovecots were only abolished in 1789.

Another indication of the priory's importance is the remains of a fish pond. As with dovecots, fish ponds were reserved to landowners. The typical fresh-water fish-pond in Norman Ireland would have been stocked with European perch, roach, bream, tench, and pike (regarded as great delicacy), and later with carp. An excellent example of a monastic fishpond, in use since medieval times, is that of the Benedictine Abbey of Kremsmünster in Upper Austria.

Unlike other manors, however, the priory of Ballybeg does not appear to have had an enclosure for deer.

Like its Bridgetown counterpart, Ballybeg, in which the de Roches also had a part in its foundation and endowment, was probably held from the de Barrys in frankalmoign and included rights such as gallows and baronial courts for all contentious issues and pleas arising on the abbey's domain among its tenants and bondsmen, excepting those reserved to the crown. Alexander fitz Hugh de la Roche enfeoffed his nephew Maurice le Fleming with the western part of Fermoy. This Maurice le Fleming gave two carucates of land for the foundation of Bridgetown Abbey, while his grandson William Fitz Richard de Barry, granted the church of Cahirduggan to the Priory of Ballybeg by charter perfected on 28 September 1273.

By the time of the priory's suppression tempore Henry VIII, the endowments of this house amounted to a demesne of some 60 acres (0.24 km^{2}) of arable land, 40 of pasture together with the priory buildings, church and cemetery. The priory also possessed 120 acres (0.49 km^{2}) of land in the townsland of Ballybeg and the following appropriated rectories: Ballybeg, Kilkeran, Ardosoyll and Rathbarry, Ballycloghie and Ballycastell, Drusmallyny in McWilliam country, Carryketwohill, Castleheghan, Kilcoryhin, Kilmallaghe, Rossaghe, Downeraghill and Caherdowgan. All of these, with the exception of Drusmallyny (the modern Crossmolina in County Mayo) were to be found in the territories of Olethan and Muscrydonegan, the ancient cantreds conquered by the Barrys. In the confiscations tempore Elizabeth I, the property of the priory of Ballybeg passed into the hands of the Master of Ordinance, Sir George Bouchier. In the reign of James I, the patentees of the property of the Austine Canons of Ballybeg were Elizabeth Norreys, daughter of the Lord President of Munster Thomas Norreys, Sir John Jephson and Sir David Norton. In the Cromwellian period, John Norcote was sent by the Commonwealth to be minister at Mallow. His son, William, came into the possessions of the Priory in the last quarter of the seventeenth century and was registered as owner of the townslands of Lagg, Ballybeg and Old Grange. The last recorded titular Prior of Ballybeg was John Baptist Sleyne (1635–1712), Bishop of Cork and Cloyne, who died in exile at Lisbon. "To-day, oxen and asses rest and ruminate under the shadow of the church of the Austins of Ballybeg, the stone coffins of the monks their watering troughs, and the tombs where rest the bones of abbots their byres".

== See also ==
- List of abbeys and priories in Ireland (County Cork)
