= Christ Church, Ballyhooly =

Anglican church in Cork, Ireland

Christ Church
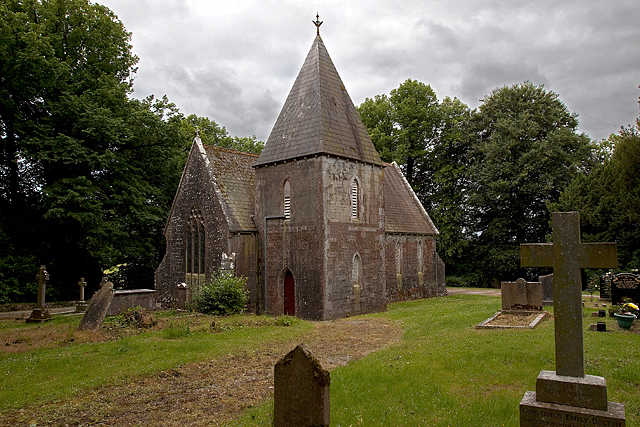

- Location within Ireland
- Christ Church
- 52°08′33″N 8°23′58″W
- Country: Ireland
- Denomination: Church of Ireland

Architecture
- Architect: William Henry Hill
- Style: Early English
- Years built: 1880-1881

Christ Church is a small Gothic Revival Anglican church located in Ballyhooly, County Cork, Ireland. It was completed in 1881. It is dedicated to Jesus Christ. It is part of the Fermoy Union of Parishes in the Diocese of Cork, Cloyne, and Ross.

== History ==
Christ Church is located on the site of an earlier church which was completed in 1774 and designed by John Morrison.

The present building was founded in 1881, on the Convamore estate, which was the estate of the earls of Listowel. The cornerstone was laid on 21 April 1880 by Lady Listowel. It was consecrated on either the 22 or 23 December 1881, by Bishop Robert Gregg. It was founded primarily at the expense of William Hare, 3rd Earl of Listowel.

== Architecture ==
William Henry Hill designed the church. It is built using stone cute form Bridgetown Abbey in Castletownroche. The church features a four-bay nave, which is built in the Early English style. The churchyard holds the Listowel Mausoleum, constructed in 1846, which is built in the Gothic Revival style, and is composed of ashlar stone.
