= Abbeystrewry Church =

Anglican church in Cork, Ireland

- 51°32′57″N 9°16′14″W
- Country: Republic of Ireland
- Denomination: Church of Ireland

Architecture
- Architect(s): William Henry Hill

Abbeystrewry Church is an Anglican church located in Skibbereen, County Cork, Republic of Ireland. It was completed in 1890. It is part of Abbeystrewry Union of Parishes in the Church of Ireland's Diocese of Cork, Cloyne, and Ross.

== History ==
Skibbereen was mentioned as having a chapel as early as 1634 being under the patronage of the Earl of Ossory. The current Abbeystrewry Church is the second church on its site. The first church was built in 1827 at a cost of IR£1,200 and was funded in part by a loan from the Board of First Fruits. It was constructed under the direction of the rector Reverend Richard Townsend in the old English style with a tower but no spire was added until funds could be raised for it. It cost a total of £1,181. 10s. 9d to build. Due to a growth of congregation, it was extended in 1842 but this was inadequate for the numbers and noted as ruining the architectural style. The new church, completed in 1890, incorporated elements of this original structure and used it as transepts, while also preserving the tower. This was funded with the rector, Canon James Goodman contributing £700 of his own money to rebuild the church.

In 2002, it was aimed that Abbeystrewry Church would gain new bells for the tower due to the deconsecration of St Nicholas' Church, Cork. However it was discovered that the bells were too big for Abbeystrewry. Accordingly, new bells were commissioned from the Whitechapel Foundry in the United Kingdom and installed in the same year. As of 2021, Rev John Ardis was serving as the rector.

== Architecture ==
The church was designed by William Henry Hill, and features a gable-fronted elevation. A ring of six bells was installed in 2002.
