= St John the Evangelist's Church, Monkstown =

Anglican church in County Cork, Ireland

Coordinates: 51°50′53″N 8°20′06″W

St John the Evangelist's Church
- St John the Evangelist's Church
- Country: Ireland
- Denomination: Church of Ireland

Architecture
- Architect: William Hill

St John the Evangelist's Church is a small Gothic Revival Anglican church located in Monkstown, County Cork, Ireland. It was completed in 1832. It is dedicated to John the Evangelist. It is part of the Diocese of Cork, Cloyne, and Ross.

== History ==
St John the Evangelist's was built in 1832 on a site donated by Gerard and Daniel Callaghan, at a cost of IR£950.

== Architecture ==
Designed by William Hill, the church is built in the Early English Gothic style of architecture. The church is cruciform, and features several unusual details such as frequent gable fronts and a canted chancel.
