= Saint Lappan =

Irish saint

Saint Lappan was an early Irish saint. The 17th century Martyrology of Donegal lists three saints named Lappan whose feast days are 26 March, 11 February and 3 November. These include:

- Lappan of County Cork, to whom a Church of Ireland church in Cork, St Lappan's Church, Little Island, is dedicated. His feast day is 26 March.
- Lappan of County Carlow, who is associated with an 8th century monastery outside Bagenalstown in the townland of Donore. He is the patron saint of Bagenalstown and his feast day is 3 November.
