= Christ Church, Drinagh =

Anglican church in Cork, Ireland

Christ Church
- Country: Ireland
- Denomination: Church of Ireland

Christ Church is a small Gothic Revival Anglican church located in Drinagh, County Cork, Ireland. It was completed in 1895 or 1896 and is dedicated to Jesus Christ. It lies within the Diocese of Cork, Cloyne, and Ross.

== History ==
Christ Church is built in the site of an earlier church completed in 1819, the stone of which was used in the creation of the current church. The building was funded by a loan from the Board of First Fruits. It was consecrated on 28 May 1897.

== Architecture ==
The church was designed by William Henry Hill.
