= Henry Houghton Hill =

Irish architect (1882 –1951)

- Born: 29 May 1882
- Died: 9 February 1951
- Occupation: Architect
- Children: Myrtle Allen
- Father: Arthur Hill

Henry Houghton Hill (29 May 1882 – 9 February 1951) was an Irish architect based in County Cork.

== Biography ==
Henry Houghton Hill was born on 29 May 1882 into an established family of Cork architects. His father, Arthur Hill, was himself the son Henry Hill. Hill's uncles, William Henry Hill, and Arthur Richard Hill were architects, as was William Hill, brother of Henry and father of William Henry. Henry Houghton's cousin, William Henry Hill Jr, was also an architect. Henry Houghton Hill was also the father of Michelin star chef Myrtle Allen.

Hill was the first student to be awarded a Bachelor of Arts with Honours in Architecture from Liverpool University School of Architecture in 1905. In 1909 he entered into practice with his father. Like his father, he lectured on architecture in University College Cork.

During World War I Hill held a commission in the Royal Engineers.
