= Scots Church =

Scots Church may refer to:

- Scots Church, Adelaide
- Scots Church, Amsterdam
- Scots Church, Cobh, Ireland
- Scots' Church, Melbourne
- Scots Church, Sydney
- Scots Church at Rotterdam
- Scots Uniting Church, Albany
- Scots Uniting Church, Campbellfield

== See also ==
- Church of Scotland
- Scots Presbyterian Church (disambiguation)
