= Liscarroll Castle =

13th-century castle in County Cork, Ireland

- County Cork, Ireland
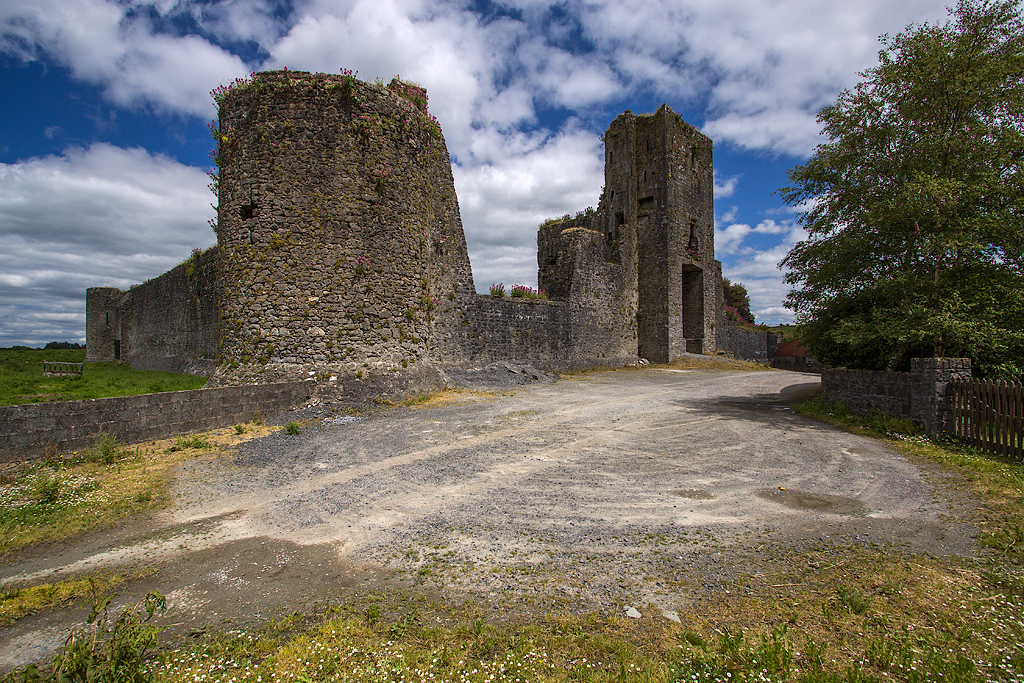
- Tower and entrance gate to Liscarroll Castle

Site information
- Type: Hiberno-Norman
- Condition: Partial ruin

Location
- Location within Ireland
- Coordinates: 52.2609°N 8.8033°W

Site history
- Built: 13th Century
- Events: Irish Confederate Wars

National monument of Ireland
- Official name: Liscarroll Castle
- Reference no.: 333

Liscarroll Castle is a 13th-century Hiberno-Norman fortress in County Cork, Ireland.

In July 1642, at the start of the Irish Confederate Wars, the castle was seized by Irish Confederate forces commanded by Garret Barry. After the subsequent Battle of Liscarroll, the castle was recaptured by British forces commanded by Murrough O'Brien, 1st Earl of Inchiquin.

The castle is the subject of an 1854 poem by Callaghan Hartstonge Gayner which concludes:

Beneath its folds assemble now, and fight with might and main,
That grand old fight to make our land "A nation once again",
And falter not till alien rule in dark oblivion falls,
We’ll stand as freemen yet, beneath those old Liscarroll walls.

During the Irish War of Independence, the castle was used as a military outpost by a detachment of 17th Lancers. The outpost was abandoned in 1921 after an IRA raid.

The remains of Castle Liscarroll still tower over the village of Liscarroll and the surrounding countryside.
