= Arthur Hill (architect) =

Irish architect (1846 – 1921)

- Born: 8 June 1846
- Died: 24 February 1921
- Occupation: Architect
- Spouse: Flora May Houghton
- Children: Henry Houghton Hill
- Father: Henry Hill

Arthur Hill (8 June 1846 – 24 February 1921) was an Irish architect based in County Cork.

== Biography ==
Born in Cork on 8 June 1846, Arthur Hill was the son of Henry Hill and nephew of William Hill, part of a dynasty of Cork-based architects that included his cousins William Henry Hill and Arthur Richard Hill, as well as his son Henry Houghton Hill and first-cousin once-removed William Henry Hill. He was the grandfather via Henry Houghton Hill of Michelin star chef Myrtle Allen.

Hill was educated at the Cork School of Art, and graduated in 1865, before he moved to London where he studied architecture at the West London school of Art. Upon his return to Cork circa 1869, he became a partner in his father's firm.

He lived in Redgarth, a house on the Douglas Road in Cork, which he designed and built for himself in 1903. He died there on 24 February 1921.

== Architectural works ==
Hill was particularly interested in the Celtic-Romanesque style of architecture.

== Publications ==
- Ancient Irish architecture: Templenahoe, Ardfert. Drawn by Arthur Hill. Cork, 1870.
- A visit to the domed churches of Charente, France, by the Architectural Association of London, in the year 1875. Co-authored with Edmund Sharpe.
