= Henry Hill (Irish architect) =

Irish architect (1806–1887)

- Born: 1806; Cork, Ireland
- Died: 30 May 1887 (aged 80–81)
- Occupation: Architect
- Spouse: Margaret McNaughton Sayers

Henry Hill (c.1806 – 30 May 1887) was an Irish architect based in County Cork.

== Biography ==
Henry Hill was the second surviving son of Thomas Hill, and along with his elder brother William Hill was half of the founding generation of the dynasty of the Hill family of architects. In the next generation, his son, Arthur Hill, along with William's son William Henry Hill, and another of his nephews, Arthur Richard Hill, all became architects. Arthur Hill's son, Henry Houghton Hill and William Henry Hill's son -also called William Henry Hill- would both go on to become architects as well. Henry Houghton Hill was also the father of Michelin star chef Myrtle Allen, making her Henry Hill's great-granddaughter.

== Architectural works ==
- Woodford & Bourne building, 1866.
- SS Joachim and Anne's Asylum, 1858–1860.
- Killanully Parish Church (Ballygarvan), 1865.
- Kilgarrife Parish Church (Clonakilty), 1818.
- Scots Church, Cobh, 1851–1855.
- St Edmund's Church, Coolkellure, 1865.
- Coolkellure House, 1874.
- Glenburne House, 1830s.
- East Ferry House and Cottage, 1846.
- Cuskinny Court, c.1835.
- Victoria Cottage, Kilnap, 1837.
- Dromderrig House, Kinsale, c.1835.
- St Lappan's Church, Little Island, 1864–1866.
- Kilroan House, Riverstown, c.1845.
- Christ Church, Rushbrooke, 1864–1866.
- Sacred Heart Convent, Rushbrooke, 1860s.
- Lissard House, 1854–1855.
