= Bridgetown Priory =

Ruined priory in Cork, Ireland

Augustinian Priory of St Mary
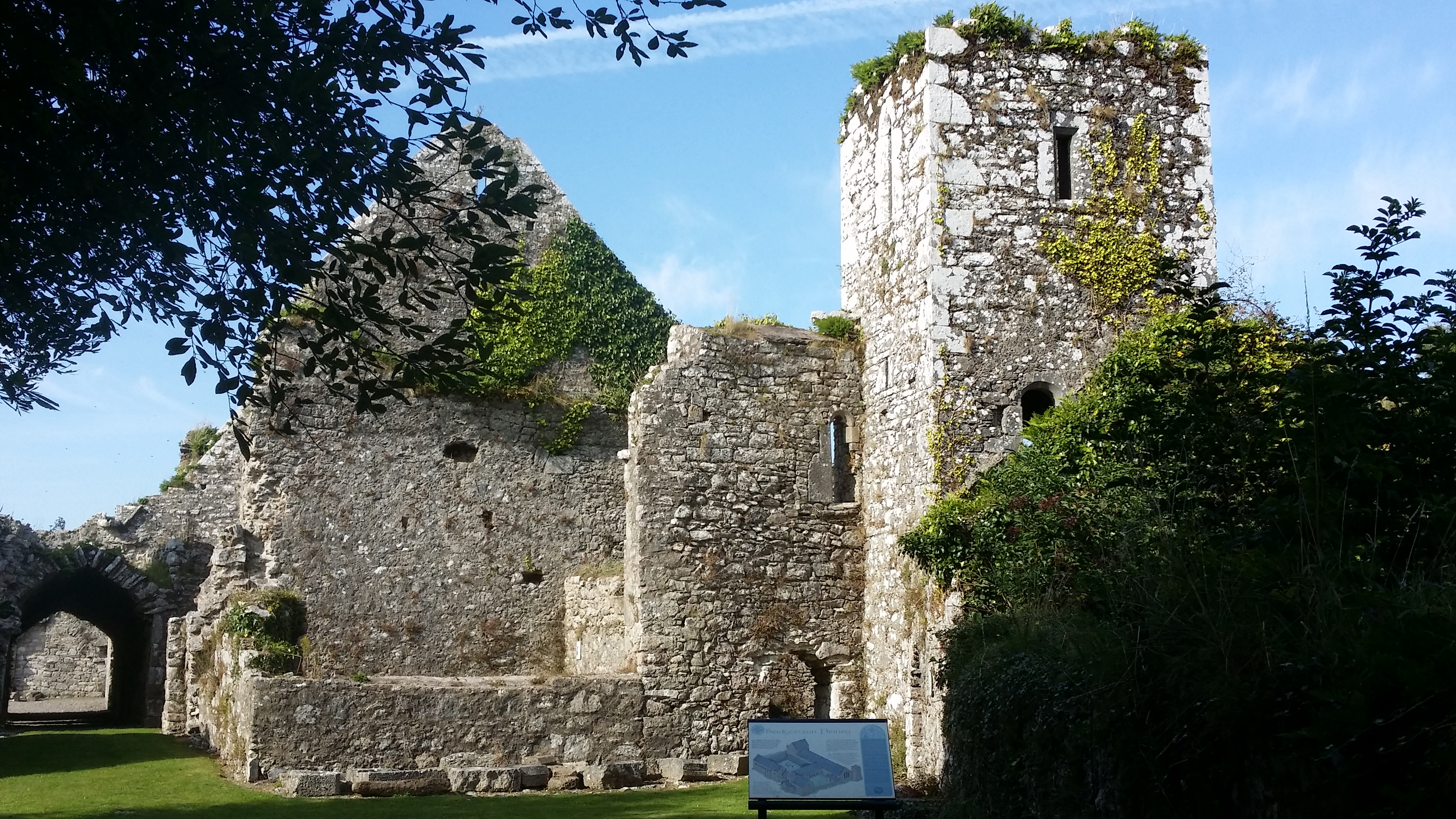

- Location within County Cork Location within Ireland
- Interactive map of Augustinian Priory of St Mary

Monastery information
- Order: Augustinian
- Denomination: Roman Catholic
- Dedication: Mary, mother of Jesus

People
- Founder: Alexander fitz Hugh

Architecture
- Status: Inactive

Site
- Coordinates: 52.14933°N 8.450211°W
- Public access: Yes

The Augustinian Priory of St Mary, most commonly referred to as Bridgetown Priory and also as Bridgetown Abbey, is a ruined 13th-century Augustinian monastery of the Canons regular of St. Victor. It is located in Castletownroche, County Cork, Ireland near where the River Awbeg meets the Blackwater. Once an affluent monastery, it was dissolved by Henry VIII in 1541, and the ruins are currently managed by Cork County Council.

The ruins are well preserved, and are among the most extensive ruins in Ireland dating from this period. Along with Ballybeg Priory, it is one of only two substantial Augustinian monasteries in County Cork.

The priory is listed on the Record of Monuments and Places, number CO034-027002.

== History ==
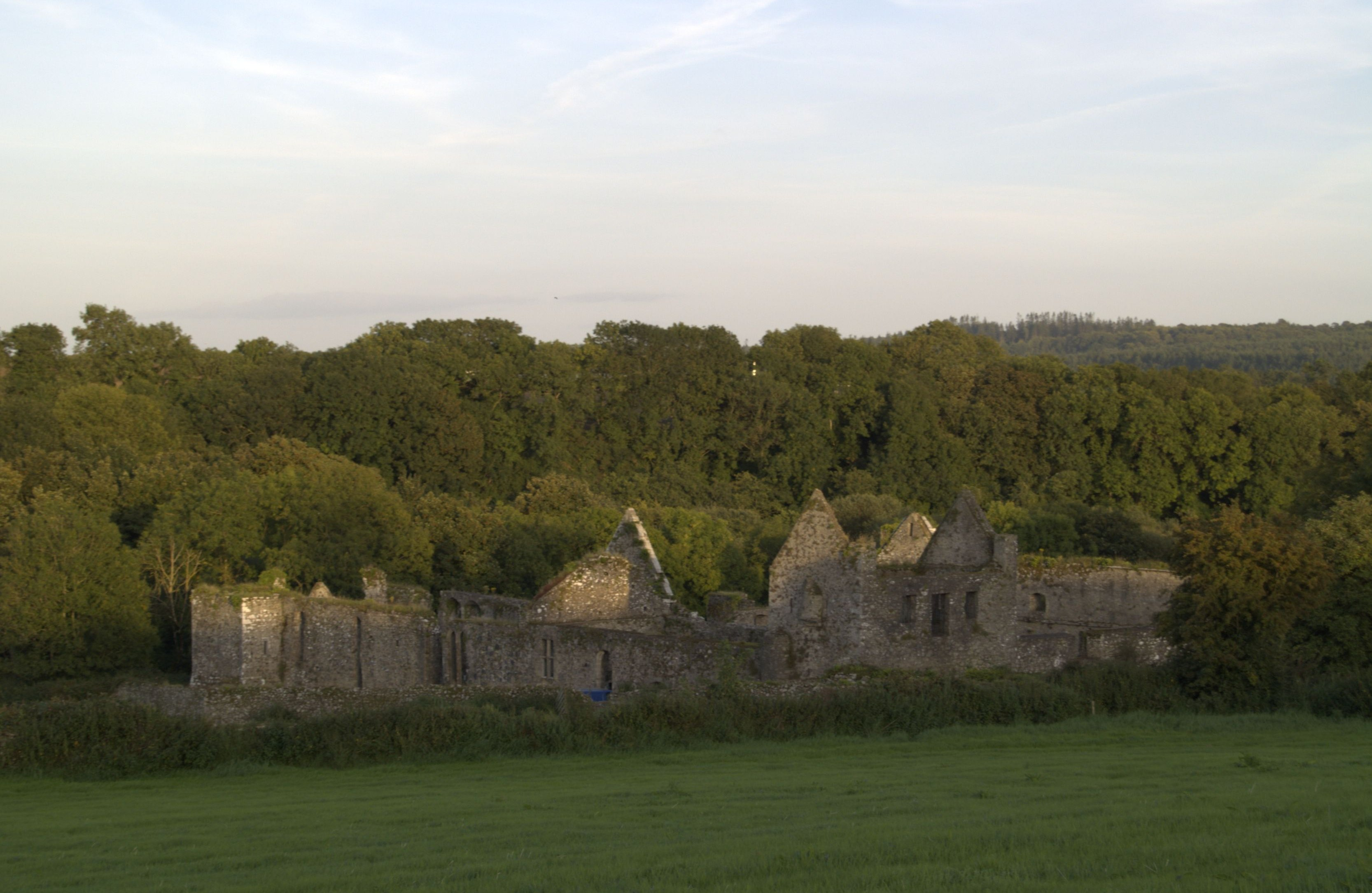
Bridgetown Abbey from nearby field

=== Early history ===
Bridgetown Priory was founded sometime after 1202 and before 1216 on land donated to the Augustinians by Alexander fitz Hugh. (Note: O'Keefe (1999) writes that the monastery could have been founded no earlier than 1202 and no later 1216, which is corroborated by Hallinan et al. (2015). Keohane (2020) gives the possible founding as between 1206 and 1216, while Power states that it was founded in 1214 (1988).) It was colonized with monks from Newtown Abbey, in County Meath. It was dedicated to Saint Mary of the Bridge. It is likely that around 1219 fitz Hugh's lands and his patronage of the church passed to the Roches of Castletownroche, through the marriage of Synolda fitz Hugh. The monks owned land on either side of the river, and two timber bridges existed to allow them to cross, neither of which are extant today, though foundation stones are still visible on the south bank of the river. In a Henrician survey, the value of Bridgetown priory was considered to be among the most valuable in the diocese, second only to that of the Cistercian priory at Abbeymahon. Following the dissolution of the monasteries by Henry VIII, Bridgetown was officially dissolved between 1540 and 1541. Following dissolution, the monastery was finally suppressed in 1546. By this point the priory, consisting of "a church with belfry, dormitory, hall, buttery, kitchen, cloister, and cellar, wit divers [sic] other chambers", was in ruinous condition.

Sources differ in their account of what happened next: According to one account, the priory was surrendered to Sir Henry Sidney between 1576 and 1577, and was abandoned shortly afterwards - sometime between 1585 and 1600. These reports continue to claim that in 1595 Bridgetown was granted to Lodowick Bryskett, secretary to the Lord President of Munster to hold for fifty years - though by 1614, a survey carried by William Lyon, Bishop of Cork, Cloyne and Ross, found that the priory was jointly owned by Lord Roche and Sir Daniel O'Brien.

According to a contradictory account, the Roches reclaimed the monastery in 1577, with it remaining under their control until 1592, and during this time the monks remained resident in the priory. By this account, the priory was seized by Sir Robert Cecil, before a Ladowich Brysketh (presumably the same person as Ludovick Briskett in the other account) was granted the priory and its lands in 1592. In 1597, the priory was supposedly bought by Edmund Spenser as a gift for his son. Spenser might have acquired it from Bryskett, who was a very old friend of his.

A bridge which gave the abbey its name was destroyed by Oliver Cromwell in the mid-1600s.

By the 18th century, the remains of the priory had fallen into a state of disrepair, worsening further in the 19th century. In the early 1800s, the cloister was being used as a ball alley by local peasants. During the 1830s a destitute woman lived in one of the priory's burial tombs with her two cats, and subsisted off of the charity of locals residents. She lived there for at least two years. A Protestant church was erected on the ruins in the mid-1800s, likely in 1846, though the roof was removed from the church shortly after its construction. The church was taken apart and its stones were used in the construction of Christ Church, Ballyhooly between 1800 and 1801.

=== In state care ===
By 1901, the priory was in possession of the Church Temporalities' Commission. The parish priest at this time, the Very Rev Michael Canon Higgins, complained that the ruins were ivy-covered and in a state of collapse, and that the Commission wasn't affording the ruins any protection. The priory has been in the care of Cork County Council since 1992. The priory underwent extensive restoration works in the 1970s, 1990s, and in 2010, all undertaken by the council. O'Keefe, writing in 1999, stated that these works, particularly those carried out in the 1990s, had "reversed the trend of neglect" the ruins had experienced up to that point. It underwent excavations in 1998. Excavations were carried out in advance of preservation works to be undertaken by the council. In initial excavations, it was discovered that the original floor surfaces, dating to the 13th and 15th centuries, had been destroyed. In further excavation works carried out that same year, buildings to the west of the church were uncovered, and are thought to belong to a late period in the monastery's history, and likely after its abandonment. At the end of these excavations, it was believed that further structures remained to be uncovered.

== Architecture ==
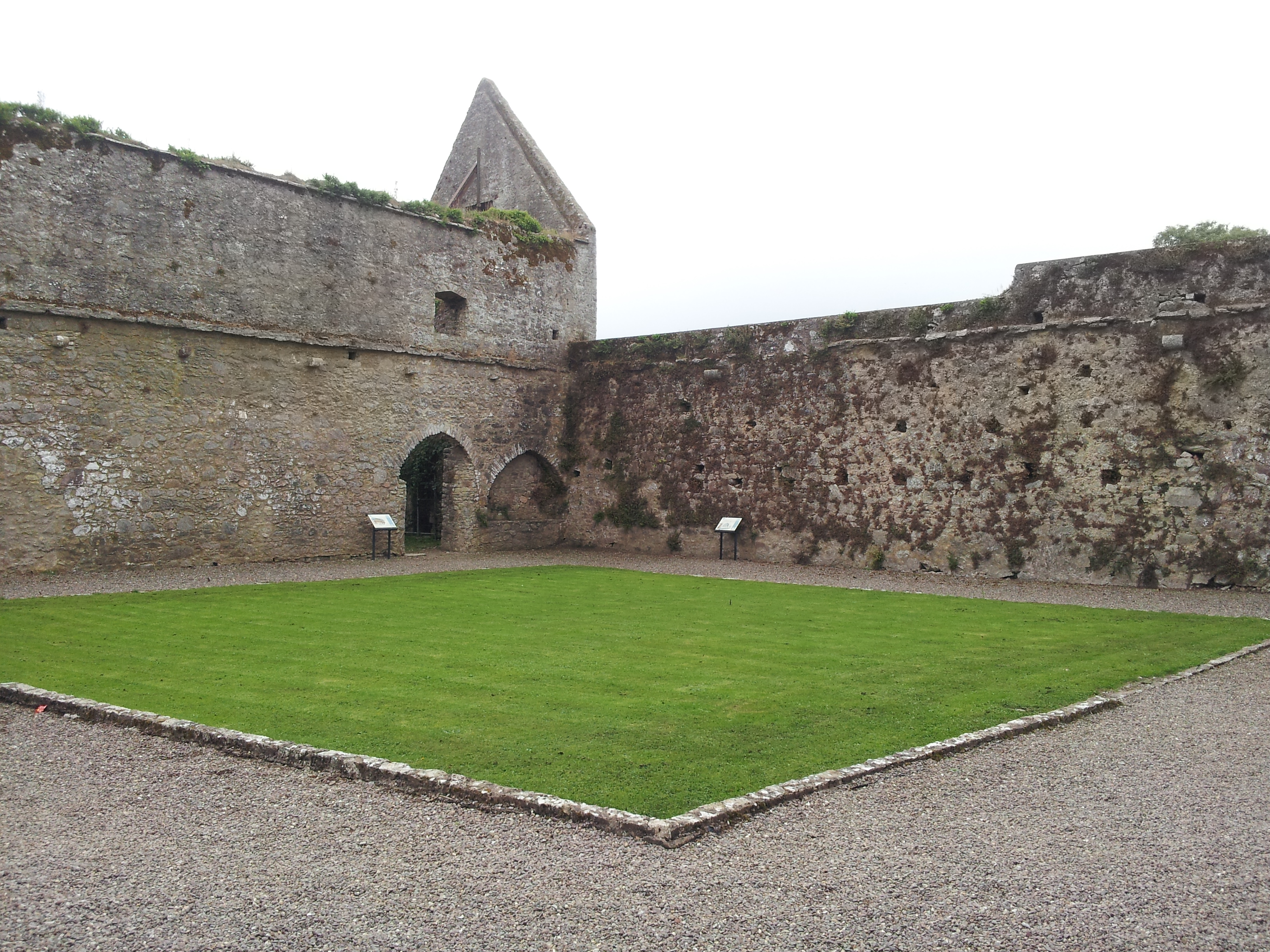
The cloister at Bridgetown Abbey

The Gothic style priory is claustral in design, and is described by Cork County Council as Cork's "finest example of a 13th-century monastery" built to such a plan. The church is located to the north of the cloister, which is typical of a claustral layout. Unusually, the monastery is H-shaped, as it lacks a west range and the southern range projects eastward. The walls of the priory are uncoursed, and are built from limestone rubble. The quality of the construction of the monastery was "remarkably poor", with many of the walls having hollow cores. Sandstone was utilized for sculptural detailing of the monastery, as was oolithic limestone.

== See also ==
- List of abbeys and priories in Ireland (County Cork)
