= Cork North Infirmary =

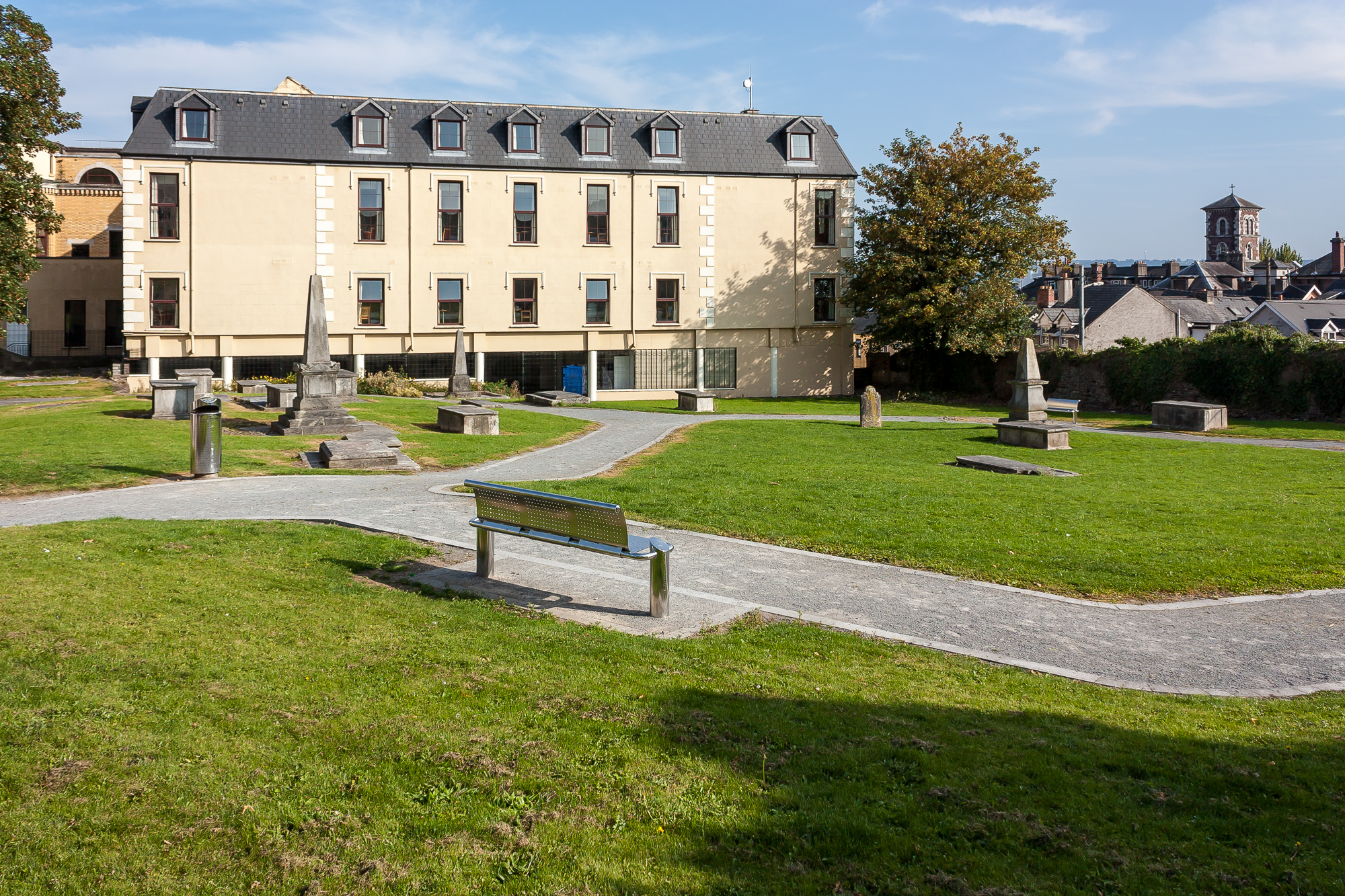
- North Infirmary with St Anne's Church Garveyard

- Shown in Ireland

Geography
- Location: Cork, County Cork, Ireland
- Coordinates: 51°54′09″N 8°28′37″W

Organisation
- Type: General

History
- Founded: 1720
- Closed: 1987

The North Infirmary (Irish: Otharlann Chorcaí Thuaidh) was the first general hospital to be opened in Cork. Originally holding only 24 beds, it eventually expanded to 115 beds. It was used as a fever hospital during the famine, housed Irish soldiers wounded in the First World War and covertly treated wounded Republicans during the War of Independence. The infirmary closed its doors on 26 November 1987, and is now a hotel.

== History ==
The North Infirmary was built on the site of the St Mary’s Church that was destroyed during the Siege of Cork in 1690. Construction began in 1719 with the 70 feet long by 24 feet wide building, containing 24 beds, completed the following year. Most of its patients during the early years were from the poor and mostly Catholic segments of society. The infirmary’s initial funding came from donations from the community, but population growth in Cork quickly outpaced this funding. In 1744 members of a musical society used their surplus funds to help expand the infirmary to allow 11 physicians and five surgeons to practice there.

In 1836 the infirmary was redesigned by architect William Hill with an increased capacity of 90 beds. During the Great Famine it was used as a fever hospital for most of 1847. In 1867 management of the infirmary was taken over by Daughters of Charity nuns, led by Sr Teresa. In 1883 construction began on a new north wing with funds donated by Lady Combermere, daughter of Dr Gibbings, a physician at the infirmary. The wing, which opened in 1886 with an extra 36 beds, was named in honour of Dr Gibbings.

By the time Sr Teresa died in 1909, the infirmary had increased its capacity to 115 beds; it contained a modern operating room, spacious wards and highly trained nurses. In 1917 the infirmary was used by military authorities to treat wounded soldiers sent home from the front lines during the First World War. During the War of Independence, injured Republicans were covertly treated at the infirmary. In the 1980s, due to cutbacks in funding, the infirmary was slated for closure by the Irish government. Though over 5,000 staff from 14 different hospitals marched in protest against the closure, the infirmary closed its doors at 4.46 pm on 26 November 1987.

Over the next years the site remained derelict, being vandalised and partially burned. It was purchased in 1996 and redeveloped into the Shandon Court Hotel. After a few years it was taken over by the Choice Hotel Group and extended to 101 rooms. In 2008 it became the Maldron Hotel which is still in operation today.
