= Kilgarriffe Church =

Anglican church in County Cork, Ireland

Kilgarrife Church
- Kilgarrife Church
- 51.6239°N 8.8895°W
- Location: Clonakilty (Kilgarriff), County Cork
- Country: Ireland
- Denomination: Church of Ireland

Architecture
- Completed: 1818

Kilgarrife Church is a small Gothic Revival Anglican church located in Clonakilty, County Cork, Ireland. It was completed in 1818. It is part of the Kilgarrife Union of Parishes, in the Diocese of Cork, Cloyne, and Ross.

== History ==
Built in 1818, the current church is the second to exist on its site. The original was built with the support of Richard Boyle, 1st Earl of Cork, in the 17th century. Its construction cost IR£1,300, £500 of which was supplied by a loan from the Board of First Fruits.

A hall associated with the church and located on Oliver Plunkett Street, Clonakilty, is itself also a protected structure.

== Architecture ==
The church is a typical example of a "Board of First Fruits" style church. Alterations made in the 1860s by Welland & Gillespie, when transepts were added under the superintendence of Henry Hill. It is built in the Gothic Revival style.
