= Hobelar =

Type of light cavalry or mounted infantry that originated in Medieval Ireland

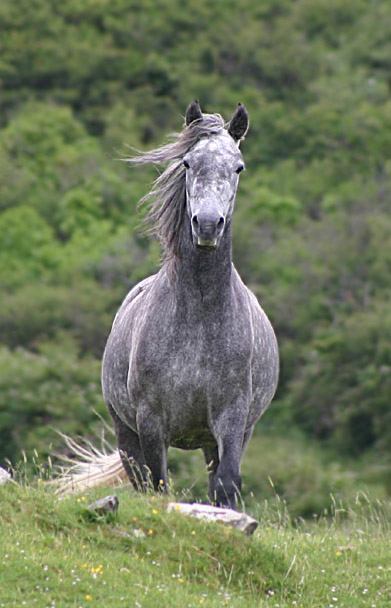
A Connemara pony, representative of the hobby

Hobelars were a type of light cavalry, or mounted infantry, used in Western Europe during the Middle Ages for skirmishing. They originated in the 13th century in Ireland and generally rode hobbies, a type of light and agile horse.

== Origins ==
According to James Lydon, "There can be little doubt that the hobelar as a type of soldier originated in Ireland ... between the fully armoured knight on the 'equus coopertus' and the lightly armoured archer on the 'equus discoopertus' there was an intermediate stage. This intermediary ... was provided by the hobelar." He further states that hobelars

were highly mobile, and excelled in scouting, reconnaissance and patrols ... eminently suited to the terrain in which military operations had to be conducted in Ireland. However superior the Norman knight might be upon the field of battle, the bogs and woods of Ireland gave little opportunity for the mail-clad charge. Thus, there evolved in Ireland, as a habitual part of every Anglo-Norman force, a type of light horseman, which came to be known as the hobelar. It was only a matter of time until this phenomenon found its way ... into other Anglo-Norman armies across the Irish Sea.

More recently, however, this view has been challenged by Robert Jones, who believes that the ancestor of the hobelar was a second-class cavalryman called a muntator. These soldiers originated in the Anglo-Welsh armies which invaded Ireland in the 12th century. Jones accepts, however, that the hobelar diverged from the Anglo-Welsh muntator during the 13th century, with the hobelar becoming lighter armed, perhaps for economic reasons. The hobelar is thus still seen as a response to military conditions in Ireland, rather than elsewhere.

== Military usage ==
Hobelars were used successfully by both sides during the Wars of Scottish Independence, with Edward I of England trying to gain an advantage by preventing Irish exports of hobbies to Scotland. Robert Bruce employed the tactic in his guerilla warfare and mounted raids, covering 60 to 70 miles (100 to 110 km) a day. Within Ireland and Britain (and beyond), they were well-known and highly valued. Edward I was much impressed by the abilities of the Irish hobelar, resulting in extensive use of them in Scotland, even procuring six of them from the Decies for his own personal use.

The first reference to hobelars dates to 1296 in Ireland, when 260 accompanied a contingent of Irish troops to Scotland under John Wogan, as part of Edward I's army. Not until after 1300 were there any references to English hobelars. Edward mustered fourteen at Carlisle in June 1301. The following year, he had three hundred and ninety included in an Irish force of two thousand three hundred. This rose to a total of four hundred and ninety-nine (out of an army of three thousand, four hundred) in 1303, all indicative of their value as light cavalry.

It is clear from their rapid adoption into English armies operating in Scotland that the hobelar met a perceived tactical need, and, in the early years of the 14th century, hobelars were to be found in all the major border garrisons. It is also clear that these hobelars are increasingly Englishmen, rather than Irish. Of the 845 hobelars at the siege of Berwick in 1319, 500 were from Cumberland and Westmorland, 36 from Barnard Castle, 24 from Norham and 45 from Tynedale. 376 English, 10 Welsh and 139 Irish hobelars were mustered at Newcastle in 1322. The hobelar became a standard feature in English forces throughout the country in the 1320s and 1330s. Muster records for 1326 show hobelars being recruited in Norfolk, Suffolk and Oxfordshire.

In the 1330s, however, a new type of mounted infantryman began to be recorded; the mounted archer. In the period 1335 to 1350, the mounted archer gradually surpassed the hobelar as the predominant mounted auxiliary, especially for foreign service. For example, of the troops summoned to serve at the siege of Calais in 1346–47, 600 were hobelars as against 5000 mounted archers. At the same time, however, the hobelar's place within the structure of English military obligation crystallised. The arms of a hobelar were first formally defined in 1335. In 1346, it was defined that a man with £10 of goods was to be armed as a hobelar

The hobelar remained a named constituent of local forces through the rest of the 14th century but was less commonly mentioned in the 15th century. The final reference to hobelars appears to be a commission of array in Norfolk and Suffolk in 1485.

== Arms and armour ==
There is no surviving description of the equipment of the original Irish hobelar, but they may have been equipped after the style of native Irish cavalry of the period, who wore aketons, hauberks, and basinets and wielded swords, scians and lances. The pony itself was unarmoured and was ridden in the Irish style, i.e., no saddle, no bridle, no stirrups. In the 1335 description mentioned above, the English hobelar equipment is listed as horse, aketon or plates, basinet or palet, gorget, iron gauntlets, sword, knife, and lance.

== Horses ==
The native Irish horse, the Irish hobby, represented today by the Connemara pony, was a horse measuring twelve to fourteen hands high. Their name derives from the French word 'hobin', thought to be derived from the Gaelic term 'obann', meaning 'swift.' Though small, the hobby was not necessarily a poor-quality horse. The average value of 11 hobbies used in 1336 in Scotland was £6.8, slightly less than the average for other warhorses, but two hobbies were valued at £10. Another loss during the 1338 campaign in Flanders was valued at 20 marks (£13.6s.8d.)

== See also ==
- Border Reivers
- Irish hobby
- Horses in the Middle Ages
- Horses in warfare
- Connemara pony
