= William Henry Hill Jr =

Irish architect (1867–1941)

William Henry Hill
- Born: 24 June 1867
- Died: 31 October 1941
- Occupation: Architect
- Years active: 1909–1940
- Father: William Henry Hill

William Henry Hill (24 June 1867 – 31 October 1941) was an Irish architect based in County Cork.

== Biography ==
William Henry Hill was born on 24 June 1867 into an established family of Cork architects. His father, also named William Henry Hill, was himself the son William Hill. Hill's uncles, Arthur Hill, and Arthur Richard Hill were architects, as was Henry Hill, brother of William and father of Arthur. William Henry's cousin, Henry Houghton Hill, was also an architect.

Hill spent three years studying in Queen's College Cork (now known as University College Cork), after which he apprenticed with his father, who made him a partner in his firm in 1899. In 1907, Hill was made diocesan architect of the Diocese of Cork, Limerick and Cashel, a position he held for the following 30 years. He succeeded his father as consulting architect for the Cork Lunatic Asylum board. He was also an engineer for the Cork and Muskerry Light Railway

== Architectural works ==
- UCC Dairy Science building
- Extensive renovations of St. Kevin's Hospital.
