= William Henry Hill Sr =

Irish architect (1837–1911)

William Henry Hill
- Born: 6 November 1837
- Died: 28 July 1911 (aged 73)
- Occupation: Architect
- Years active: 1861–1911
- Children: William Henry Hill
- Father: William Hill

William Henry Hill (6 November 1837 – 28 July 1911) was an Irish architect based in County Cork. After a fire all but destroyed Cork Courthouse, Washington Street, Hill was awarded the contract for its reconstruction.

Hill was the diocesan architect for the Anglican Diocese of Cork, Cloyne and Ross from either 1872 or 1873 to c.1878, as well as the consulting architect to the Cork Lunatic Asylum board for almost forty years.

== Biography ==
The son of William Hill, William Henry was born into a dynasty of Cork-based architects which includes his uncle, Henry Hill, his cousins Arthur and Arthur Richard Hill, his son William Henry Hill, and his first-cousin once-removed Henry Houghton Hill.

== Architectural works ==
=== Original churches ===
- Christ Church, Drinagh, 1897.
- Christ Church, Ballyhooly, 1880–1881.
- Chapel in Our Lady's Hospital Lunatic Asylum, 1885.
- St Mark's Church, Kilbonane, 1897.
- St Luke's Church, Summerhill North
- Abbeystrewry Church, Skibereen

=== Restored/expanded churches ===
- St Catherine's Church, Rincurran, 1873.
- St Senan's Church, Inniscarra, 1873.
