= Bill Hill (ice hockey) =

Canadian ice hockey player

- Born: October 28, 1885; Montreal, Quebec, Canada
- Died: November 29, 1969 (aged 84); Vancouver, British Columbia, Canada
- Height: 5 ft 8 in (173 cm)
- Weight: 170 lb (77 kg; 12 st 2 lb)
- Position: Defence
- Played for: Montreal Shamrocks
- Playing career: 1907–1915

William Andrew Hill (October 28, 1885 – November 29, 1969) was a Canadian professional ice hockey player. He played with the Montreal Shamrocks of the Canadian Hockey Association and the National Hockey Association.
