= William Hill (Irish architect) =

Irish architect (1798–1844)

- Born: 3 February 1798
- Died: July 1844 (aged 46)
- Occupation: Architect
- Children: William Henry Hill
- Relatives: Henry Hill (brother)

William Hill (3 February 1798 – July 1844) was an Irish architect based in County Cork.

== Biography ==
William Hill was the eldest son of Thomas Hill, and along with his younger brother Henry Hill was half of the founding generation of the dynasty of the Hill family of architects. In the next generation, his son, William Henry Hill, along with Henry's son Arthur Hill, and another of his nephews, Arthur Richard Hill, all became architects. William Henry Hill's son -also called William Henry Hill- and Arthur Hill's son, Henry Houghton Hill would both go on to become architects as well.

== Architectural works ==
- Cork North Infirmary, 1836. (Redesign)
- St John the Evangelist's Church, Monkstown, 1832.
- St Michael's Church, Blackrock, 1836. (Restoration after destruction)
