= Kilgarriff, County Cork =

Civil parish in County Cork, Ireland

Coordinates: 51.6423°N 8.9140°W

Kilgarriff (Irish: An Chill Gharbh), also sometimes spelled Kilgarriffe, is a civil parish in County Cork, Ireland. Clonakilty is the main town in the area.

== See also ==
- Kilgarriffe Church
