= William Hill (Iowa politician) =

American politician (1930–2021)

- Born: Ralph William Hill Jr. April 28, 1930; Lynch, Nebraska, US
- Died: March 29, 2021 (aged 90); Marshalltown, Iowa, US
- Other name: "Bill"
- Education: BA, Phillips U. (1953); BD, Drake U. (1957); JD, Drake Law (1965)
- Occupations: Lawyer; pastor; politician
- Political party: Republican
- Spouses: E. Lorraine Gulliver; Rose Mary Washington (m. 2000)
- Children: 3
- Military career
- Branch: Iowa Army National Guard

Member of the Iowa House of Representatives from the 51st district
- In office January 9, 1967 – January 10, 1971

Ralph William Hill Jr. (April 28, 1930 – March 29, 2021) was an American lawyer, pastor, and politician.

== Personal life ==
Ralph William Hill Jr. was born in Lynch, Nebraska on April 28, 1930, the son of Hazel Meachen and Ralph W. Hill. He received a Bachelor of Arts from Phillips University in 1953, a Bachelor of Divinity from Drake University in 1957, and a Juris Doctor from Drake University Law School in 1965. He married E. Lorraine Gulliver, and they had three children: Cathryn, Charles and Edward. In 2000, he married Rose Mary Washington. Hill died in Marshalltown, Iowa on March 29, 2021.

== Career ==
In Liscomb, Iowa, Hill was a pastor at the Liscomb Church of Christ (1953–1956), the Bethel Grove Christian Church (1956–1963), and the United Church of Christ (beginning in August 1966); he was also a chaplain in the Iowa Army National Guard.

In Marshalltown, Iowa, Hill practiced law. In Des Moines, Iowa, he made law as the Republican 51st-district representative to the Iowa House of Representatives during the 62nd (January 9, 1967 – January 12, 1969) and 63rd (January 13, 1969 – January 10, 1971) Iowa General Assemblies.
