= St Luke's Church, Summerhill North =

Deconsecrated church in Cork, Ireland

Coordinates: 51.90423°N 8.4571°W

St Luke's Church
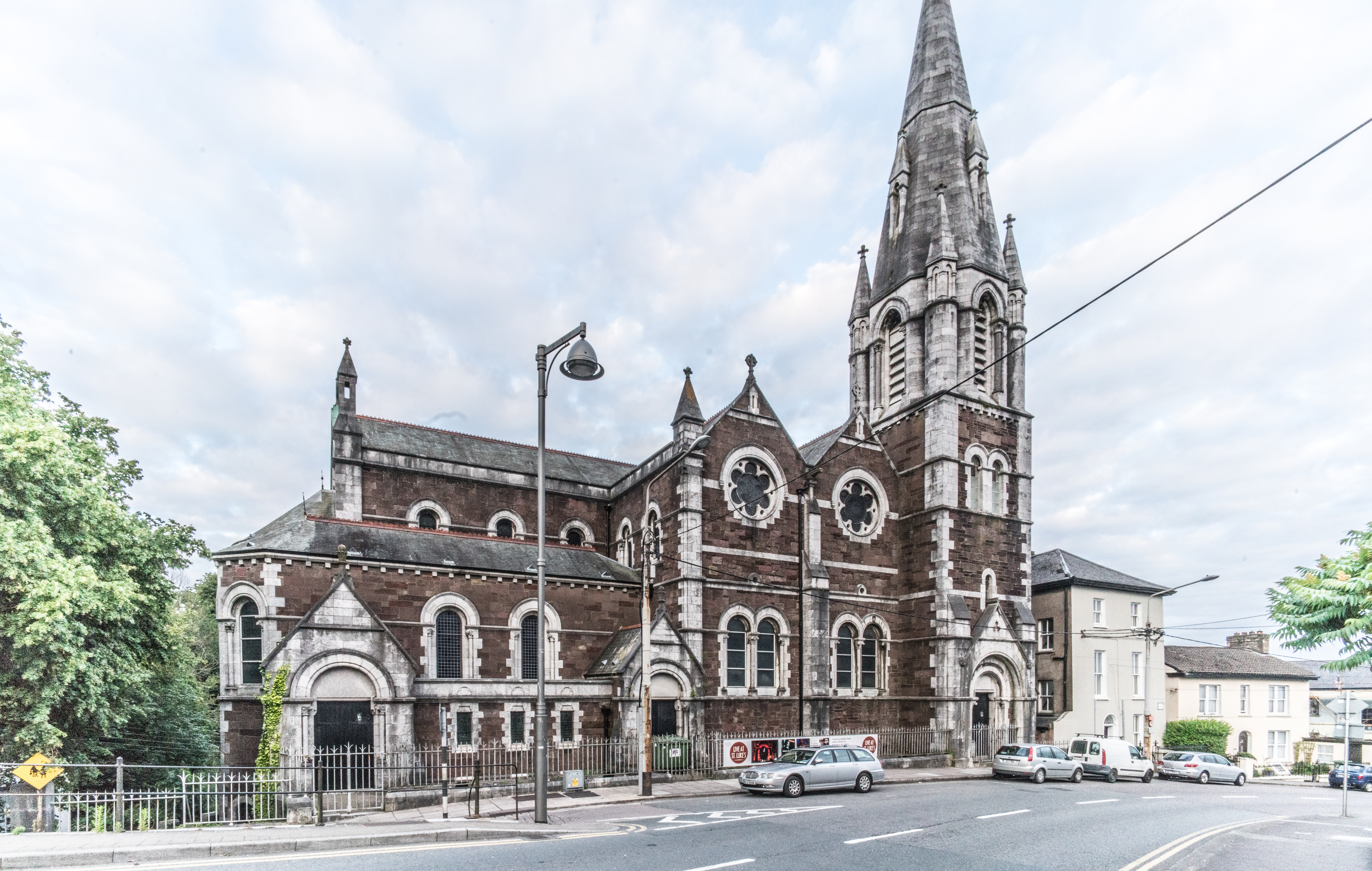
- Country: Ireland
- Denomination: Church of Ireland

History
- Consecrated: 7 February 1889 - 2003

Architecture
- Architect: William Henry Hill

St Luke's Church is a deconsecrated Romanesque Revival Anglican church located in Cork city, Ireland, currently owned by Cork City Council and in use as a live music venue stylized as Live at St Luke's. It was completed in 1830. It is dedicated to Luke the Evangelist, and was part of the Diocese of Cork, Cloyne, and Ross.

== History ==
The current building was the third church to be built on this site, all of which have been dedicated to Luke the Evangelist. The first church was designed by George Richard Pain and was consecrated on 21 October 1837. Originally intended as a chapel of ease for St Anne's Church, by the 1850s the original cruciform building was too small to adequately serve its parishioners, and when St Luke's was made a parish in 1872, a new larger church was planned.

The new church was designed in collaboration by architects John Benson and William Henry Hill, and was in the Romanesque style. It was consecrated on 14 January 1875, though it was not completed until 1878, at a cost of IR£6,000, and was opened in September of that year. Nine years later, on 9 February 1887, this new church was burnt down.

John Benson having died in 1874, William Henry Hill was the sole architect of the current church. Again designed in Romanesque style, this church took two years to build, and was consecrated on either 7 or 8 February 1889. The church was de-consecrated in 2003 due to falling numbers of parishioners. Built to seat 800 people, there were only thirteen parishioners in attendance at the last service held in the church.

The church building was bought by a private owner, before being acquired by its current owners, Cork City Council, who carried out extensive restorative works on the property in 2010. Since 2015 St Luke's has been in use as a music venue, stylized as Live at St Luke's.

== Architecture ==
St Luke's is built in the Romanesque style, and is built of local red sandstone with limestone dressings.

=== Sources ===
- O'Connor, Amy (18 July 2018). "'It was literally a dump': The stories behind 3 of Ireland's unlikeliest music venues". thejournal.ie.
