= River Awbeg =

River in southwestern Ireland, tributary of the Munster Blackwater

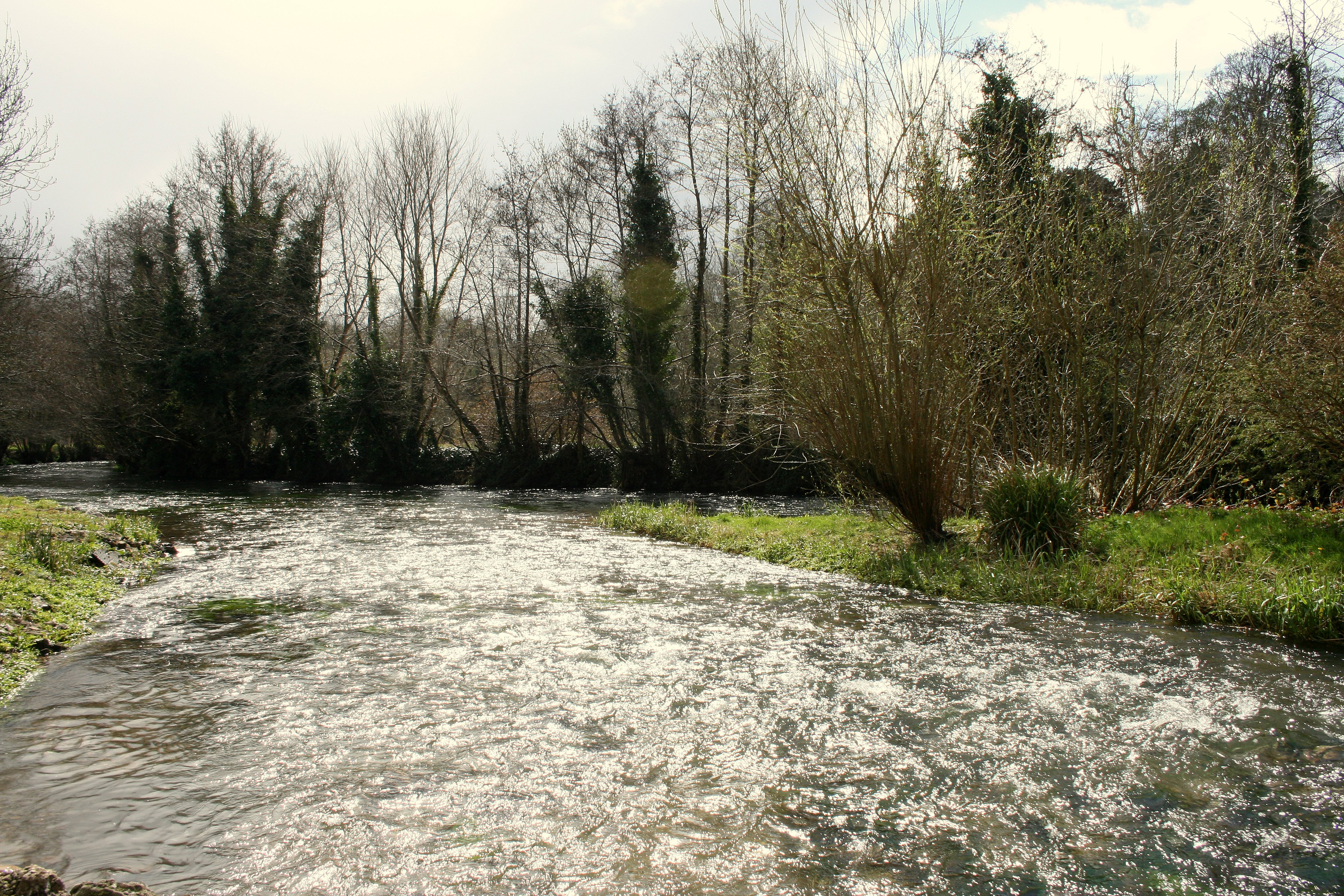
- River Awbeg at Castletownroche
- Etymology: Irish: the small river
- Native name: An Abha Bheag (Irish)

Physical characteristics
- Source
  - location: Ballyhoura Mountains, County Limerick
- Mouth: Munster Blackwater
  - location: Bridgetown Abbey, Castletownroche, County Cork
- Length: 51.10 km (31.75 mi)
- Discharge
  - average: 1.3 m^{3}/s (46 cu ft/s)

Awbeg River (from Irish An Abha Bheag, meaning 'the small river') is a river in the south of Ireland. It is a tributary of the Blackwater and flows into that larger river at a point in County Cork.

== Name ==
The English name of the river derives from the Irish An Abha Bheag or An Abhainn Bheag, meaning 'small river' or 'little river'. The English poet Edmund Spenser, who lived at the nearby Kilcolman Castle, referred to the Awbeg as the Mullagh or Mulla.

== Course ==
There are two tributaries of the Awbeg. The first rises in County Limerick as the Gralgne River and enters County Cork a half mile north-east of Ardskeagh Cross Roads, then flows west under a railroad bridge and south under Farran bridge on the Buttevant/Charlevllle road.

The second branch rises about two miles north of Liscarroll and flows south and then north and west under Annagh Bridge to join the first branch at Scart Bridge.

From there, the river flows south through Buttevant and east through Doneraile, turns south near Shanballymore and through Castletownroche to enter the Blackwater at Poulcormac near Bridgetown Abbey.

== Ecology ==
North of Buttevant the river flows through flat agricultural land, while south of Buttevant the river generally flows through a narrow, steep-sided valley with wooded sides. For the most part the river flows over Carboniferous limestone. The river supports a range of plant species including dropwort, pondweed, club-rush, water-cress and Ranunculus. The river is largely fringed by a narrow strip of marsh vegetation, dominated by reed-canary grass. The Awbeg is a breeding ground for otters and supports a significant population of Atlantic salmon. The site supports a population of white-clawed crayfish, a threatened species.

== Old bridges ==
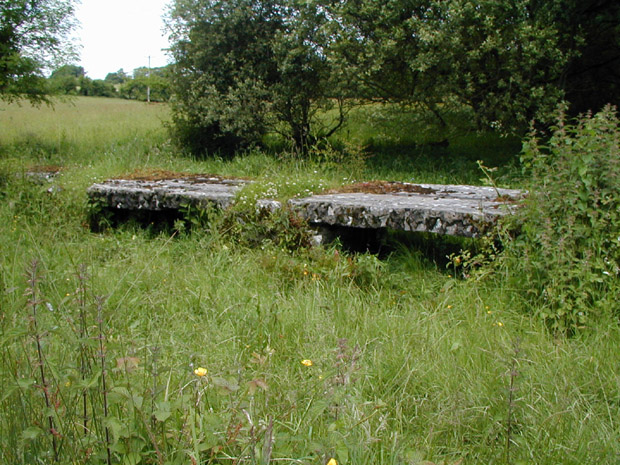
Remains of a clapper bridge near Ballybeg Priory and Springfield House

An old stone bridge over the Awbeg River in Buttevant, known locally as Blake's Bridge, may date to the same period as the nearby 13th-century Augustinian abbey and Franciscan friary. It was widened at some point and extended in the mid-18th century.

The ancient clapper bridge near Ballybeg Priory was erected in the 13th century by the Augustinian friars of Ballybeg for convenience in crossing the Awbeg to their mill and lands beyond. It is constructed of large slabs of limestone that are about 3 m long, equally wide, and each weighing a ton. The transverse slabs measure 2.7 m to 3.0 m in length and are wide and thick in proportion and each weighs a tonne.

== Holy wells ==
There are a number of holy well sites on the river. These include a well on the grounds of Blackwater Castle, in Castlewidenham townland near Castletownroche, which is close to a former sheela na gig site. Another such well, Knockanare Well in Knockanare townland, is on the left bank of the Awbeg river, about a half-mile east of Buttevant and southeast of the Ballyhoura Mountains. Folklore attributes special powers to this well, such as that its water will not boil or that two trout appear in it at certain times of the year. Other tales suggest that, following a battle in the area, wounded soldiers were taken to Knockanare Well and cured instantly. An earlier mythological story also refers to miraculous cures and recounts how one of Fionn Mac Cumhail's men, who was mortally wounded after eloping with a local chieftain's daughter, was cured after bathing in the well.
