= Buttevant =

Town in County Cork, Ireland

Buttevant Cill na Mullach
- Town
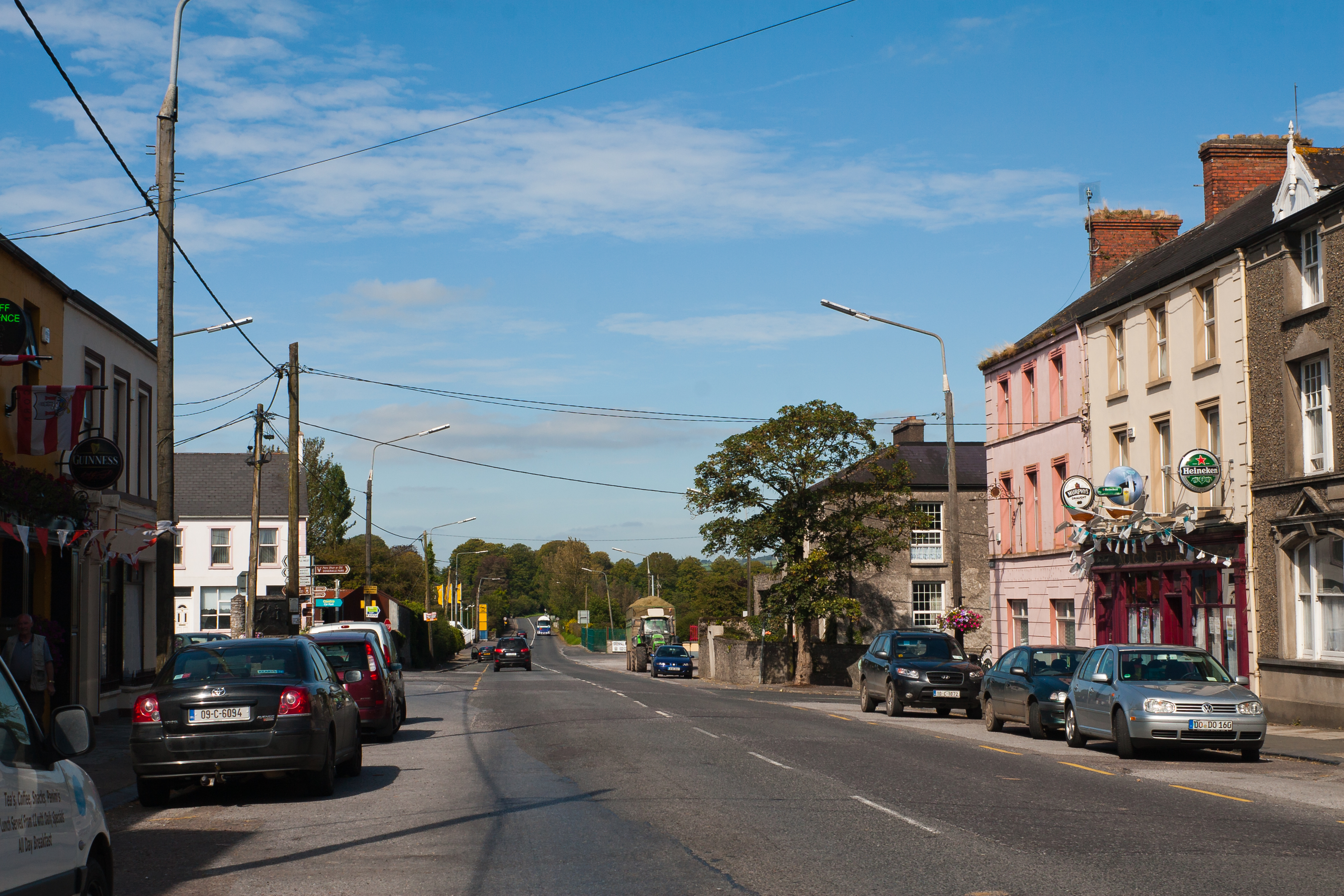
- Main Street

- Location in Ireland
- Coordinates: 52°13′59″N 8°40′1″W
- Country: Ireland
- Province: Munster
- County: County Cork
- Elevation: 100 m (330 ft)

Population (2022)
  - Total: 1,080
- Time zone: UTC+0 (WET)
  - Summer (DST): UTC-1 (IST (WEST))
- Area code: 022
- Irish grid reference: R540092

Historical population
Year	Pop.	±%
1831	1,536	—
1841	1,524	−0.8%
1851	1,530	+0.4%
1861	2,372	+55.0%
1871	1,756	−26.0%
1881	1,409	−19.8%
1891	1,580	+12.1%
1901	979	−38.0%
1911	1,754	+79.2%
1926	834	−52.5%
1936	881	+5.6%
1946	793	−10.0%
1951	769	−3.0%
1956	1,027	+33.6%
1961	981	−4.5%
1966	978	−0.3%
1971	1,045	+6.9%
1981	1,161	+11.1%
1986	1,133	−2.4%
1991	1,125	−0.7%
1996	1,070	−4.9%
2002	987	−7.8%
2006	914	−7.4%
2011	945	+3.4%
2016	970	+2.6%

Buttevant (Irish: Cill na Mullach, meaning 'church of the summits'; Latin: Ecclesia Tumulorum) is a medieval market town in County Cork, Ireland.

The town was incorporated by charter of Edward III in the 14th century. While there are reasons to suggest that the town may occupy the site of an earlier settlement of the Donegans, Carrig Donegan, the origins of the present town are distinctly Norman, and closely connected with the settlement of the Barrys from the 13th century onwards. Here they built their principal stronghold in north Cork.

Buttevant is located on the N20 road between Limerick and Cork and the R522 regional road. The Dublin–Cork railway line passes by the town, and there was a station (now closed) from which at the outbreak of the First World War in 1914, newly raised battalions of the Royal Munster Fusiliers and the Royal Dublin Fusiliers who had completed their training at the local military barracks, set out for the Western Front. The town is in a townland and civil parish of the same name. Buttevant is part of the Cork East Dáil constituency.

== Etymology ==
The Barry family motto is Boutez-en-Avant. Rotulus Pipae Cloynensis (1364) makes ten references to Bothon in its Latin text. The Lateran Registers record the name tempore Pope Innocent VIII as Bottoniam (7 March 1489) and Buttumam (3 June 1492); and tempore Pope Alexander VI in various forms: as "Bothaniam" (14 February 1499), "Betomam" (12 March 1499), and "Buttomam" (15 January 1500). Edmund Spenser, in Colin Clouts Come Home Againe (1595), gives an early example of the modern name and associates it with Mullagh, his name for the river Awbeg:

"Old father Mole, (Mole hight that mountain grey
That walls the Northside of Armulla dale)
He had a daughter fresh as floure of May,
VVhich gaue that name vnto that pleasant vale;
Mulla the daughter of oldMole, so hight
The Nimph, which of that water course has charge,
That springing out of Mole, doth run downe right
to Butteuant where spreading forth at large,
It giueth name vnto that auncient Cittie,
VVhich Kilnemullah cleped is of old:
VVhose ragged ruines breed great ruth and pittie,
To travellers, which it from far behold"

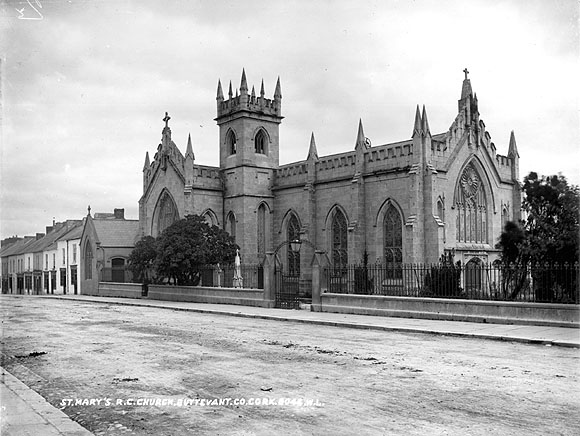
St Mary's Church, Buttevant ca. 1900

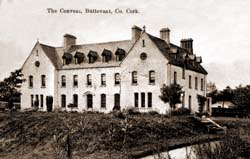
Buttevant Convent 1879 by architect G.C. Ashlin

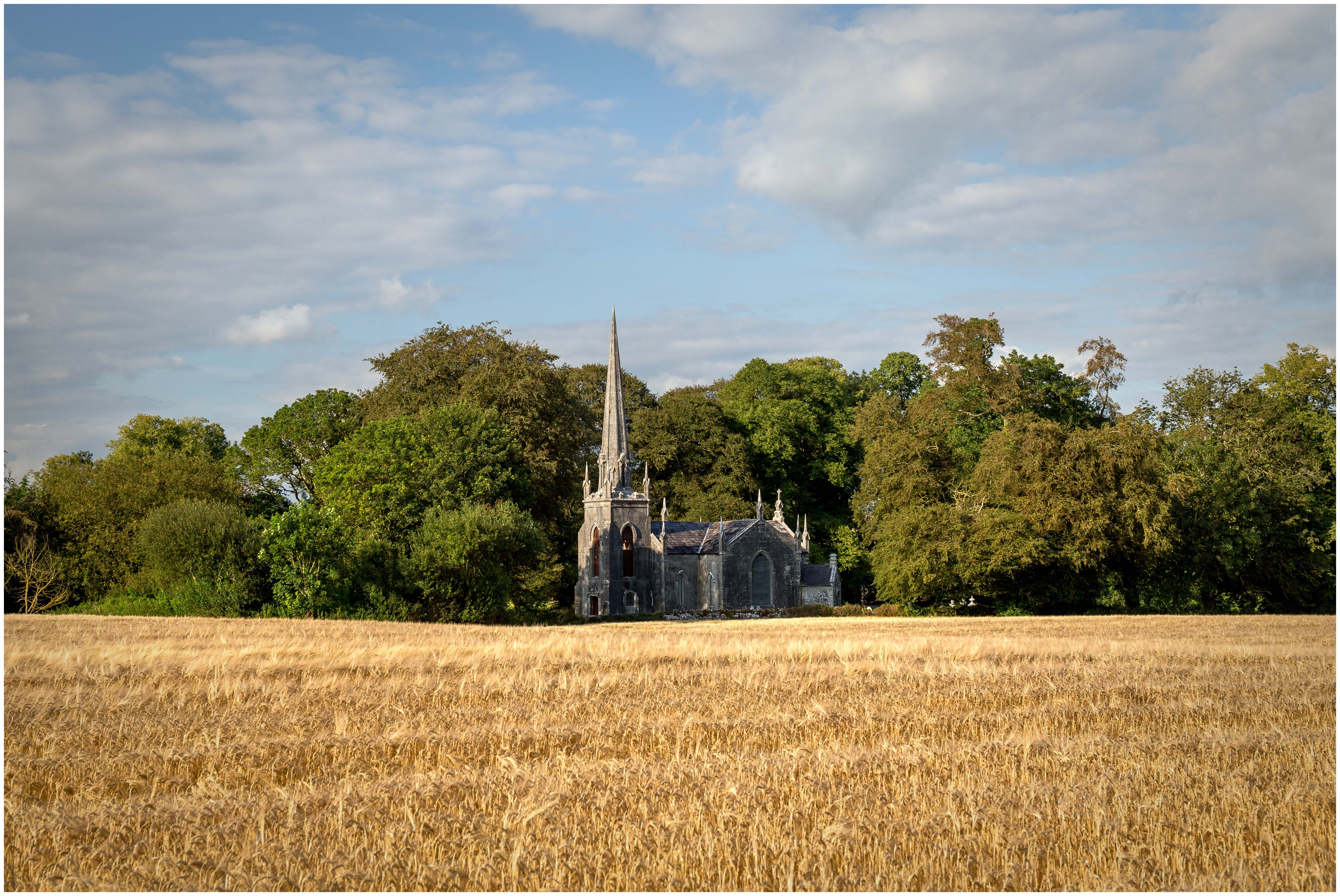
St. John's Church, Buttevant

The Bibliothèque Royale in Brussels contains the manuscript of Father Donatus Mooney's report on the Irish Province of the Franciscans compiled in 1617/1618 in which he notes that the place "is called 'Buttyfanie' and, in Irish, 'Kilnamullagh' or 'Killnamallagh'". Philip O'Sullivan Beare in his Historiae Catholicae Iberniae, published in Spain in 1620, gives the name 'Killnamollacham' for the town and translates it into Latin as 'Ecclesia Tumulorum'. James Butler, 1st Duke of Ormonde refers to "Buttiphante" in a letter of January 1684 (Carte Manuscripts, Bodleian, 161, f. 47v), while Sir John Percival, progenitor of the Earls of Egmont, recorded in his diary for 16 March 1686 that the troopers "being att Buttevant Fair this day took Will Tirry and his wife and brought them hither and I examined them".

The Irish denomination for Buttevant has reached such a degree of confusion as to make it almost unidentifiable. The oral tradition of the area consistently gives Cill na Mullach, or 'Church of the Hillocks', for Buttevant. When the area was still largely Irish speaking, that tradition was recorded by O'Donovan in the field books of the General Survey of Valuation, Griffith's valuation, which was taken in the Barony of Orrery and Kilmore ante 1850. Peadar Ua Laoghaire confirms the tradition in his Mo Scéal Féin. That notwithstanding, several other names have insistently been assigned to Buttevant by Irish Government officialdom: Cill na mBeallach, Cill na Mollach, and more recently Cill na Mallach by the Placenames Commission, explaining eruditely that it may signify The Church of the Curse, for which, the general public can be excused for thinking the commission were referring to nearby Killmallock. P.W. Joyce in his The Origin and History of Irish Names of Places, published in Dublin in 1871, dismisses as erroneous and an invention of later times, the theory that the Irish name for Buttevant meant the Church of the Curse, and cites the Four Masters noting that a Franciscan Friary was founded at Cill na Mullach in 1251.

The name Buttevant is reportedly a corruption of the motto of the de Barry family. On the Barry coat of arms the inscription is "Butez en Avant" - Strike/Kick/Push Forward—or, more colloquially, "Bash your way forward."

== History ==
Henry III of England, by grant of 26 September 1234, conceded a market at Buttevant to David Og de Barry to be held on Sundays, and a fair on the vigil and day of St. Luke the Evangelist (17 October and 18 October), and on six subsequent days. This was done to further the economic prosperity of the borough and connected with a widespread network of such markets and fairs which indicate "an extensive network of commercial traffic and an important part of the infrastructure of the growing agrarian and mercantile economy". The most important markets and all fairs were associated with the major boroughs and can be used as a gauge of their economic and social significance as also the 1301 quo warranto proceedings in Cork at which John de Barry "claimed the basic baronial jurisdiction of gallows, infangetheof, vetitia namia and fines for shedding blood (where 'Englishmen' were involved) in his manors of Buttevant, Castlelyons, Rathbarry and Lislee".

The town of Buttevant accumulated a series of such grants over several centuries. Fairs and markets were held at Buttevant for cattle sheep and pigs on 23 January, 30 April, 27 May, 27 August and 21 November. Cattle and sheep fairs were held on 27 March, 14 October, 17 December. Pig markets were held on 11 July. Fairs falling on Saturdays were held on Mondays. Fridays were devoted to egg markets. Horse fairs were held on the Fourth Monday in October. Cahirmee Horse Fair, the only surviving fair, is held on 12 July.

The development of the settlement followed a pattern frequently repeated in the Norman colonies of North Cork and Limerick. The original nucleus of the town consisted of a keep situated on an elevation on the south side of the town. Opposite the keep, on a pre-Norman site, was built the parish church, dedicated to St. Brigit, sister of St. Colman of Cloyne. A mill, another characteristic element of Norman settlements, was located on the river, to the north of the keep. In addition, a hospice for lepers was established about a mile to the North East outside of the town wall. This basic structure was repeated in nearby Castletownroche, where it is still clearly to be seen, in Glanworth, Mallow, and in Kilmallock and Adare.

A further feature of Norman settlements in North Cork was their concomitant religious foundations. Early colonial sites, such as Buttevant and Castletownroche, saw the introduction of the more traditional monastic communities which were housed in foundations outside of the town walls. The Augustinian priories of Bridgetown (ante 1216) and Ballybeg (1229) being respectively founded by the Roches and the de Barry contiguous to the settlements of Castletownroche and Buttevant. With the rise of the new mendicant orders, essentially urban in character and mission, the Norman settlements saw the foundation of mendicant houses within the town walls as with the Franciscans in Buttevant (1251), and the Dominicans in Kilmallock (1291) and Glanworth (c. 1300).

The burgage of Buttevant developed to the north of the keep and eventually increased in size to about 50 acres (200,000 m^{2}) enclosed by walls for which Murage grants had been made by the crown in 1317. The native inhabitants were excluded from residence within the walled area and confined to a quarter of their own to the north west of the walled town.

A bridge, still extant, was built over the river Awbeg around 1250.

In 1317, the 11th. of Edward II of England, John fitz David de Barry requested and obtained from the exchequer a grant of £105 for the commonality and town of Buttevant for its walling. A further grant was made on 6 August 1375, the 49th. of Edward III, to the provost and commonality of the town together with the customs of its North Gate.

The steeplechase originated in 1752 as a result of a horse race from the steeple of Buttevant Protestant church to that of Doneraile, four miles (6 km) away.

== Ecclesiastical sites ==
Ballybeg Priory is a 13th-century Augustinian priory which is located to the south of the town.

Buttevant Franciscan Friary is a Franciscan friary which is situated beside the church on Buttevant's Main Street and is near the Awbeg river.

== Events ==
The Cahirmee Horse Fair is an annual horse fair held in Buttevant. Originally held outside the town at Cahirmee, it has been held in the town itself since the 1921.

== Buttevant military barracks ==
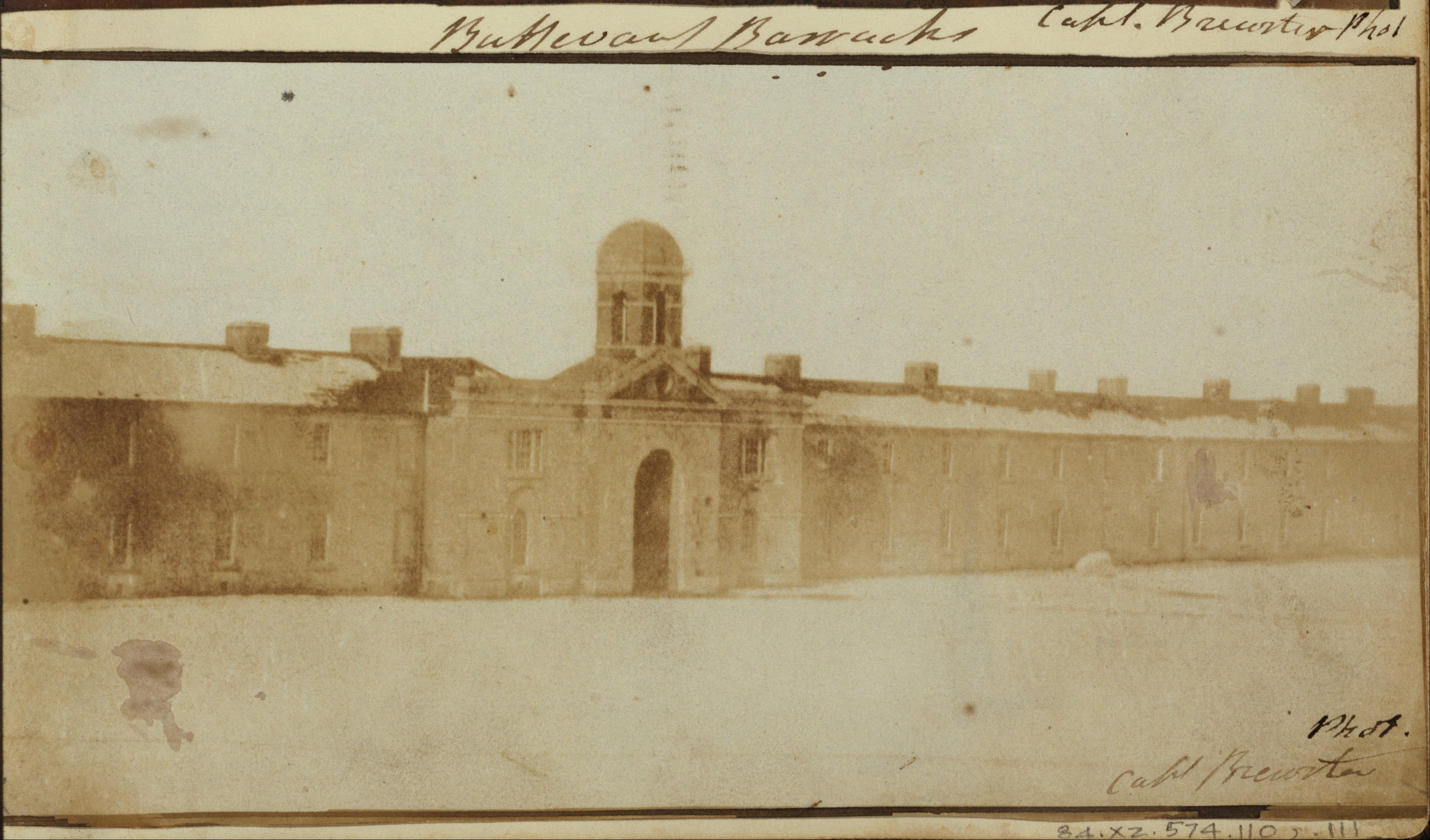
Captain Henry Craigie Brewster. Buttevant Barracks, c.1840s

Buttevant barracks was a 19th-century military barracks. The barracks is listed in the National Inventory of Architectural Heritage.

Buttevant military barracks was built in 1812, when the owner of Buttevant castle, John Anderson gifted 23 acres of land in Buttevant to the British Army for the purpose of the construction of a military barracks. Construction of the barracks took nearly three years to complete. The barracks was divided into three quadrangles and hosted an extensive range of buildings and facilities, including a gymnasium, training field, church, school, stables and a parade ground. At any one time the barracks was home to hundreds of soldiers and could accommodate up to 800 soldiers and staff. The main gateway to the barracks was made from limestone and was constructed in the Neo gothic style. A guardhouse which was placed inside this gateway controlled access into the barracks.

Michael Myers Shoemaker visited Buttevant barracks in 1908 and writes of his visit in his book, In Wondering in Ireland (1908). He wrote, '...these barracks at Buttevant are spacious and as barracks go, very comfortable.... The campus or compound, a great green square surrounded by the quarters....often with lawn tennis and cricket going on in its centre and there are always the officers wives and children giving the scene a touch of charm'. He continues by writing, 'on top of the entrance arch are the offices, on the right of the guardhouse and beyond it a large gymnasium. On either side of the green and running at right angles to the entrance are the officers' quarters. While a large barracks for the men forms the fourth side of the square. Back of this is another square, surrounded by a large barracks, while the married man have a separate building beyond these and the colonel lives in a retired pleasant house off in one corner'.

Support required for the everyday running barracks was immense. The barracks provided important commerce for the town and it is estimated that up to the 20th century it is estimated that up to 70% of the towns income came from the barracks. Throughout World War I thousands of men were processed through the barracks before being sent elsewhere. Later, during the Irish War of Independence the barracks was an important staging point for British forces. With the departure of British forces at the end of the Irish War of Independence, the barracks was abandoned. It was later temporarily occupied by both anti-treaty and pro-treaty parties and was eventually burned and destroyed during the Irish Civil War.

Today, evidence of the barracks is all but gone, with only an incomplete perimeter wall and the entrance to the barracks still remaining. The area where the barracks stood is now divided into three sections, one is occupied by Buttevant GAA and the two others are occupied by local businesses.

== Literary history ==
Buttevant also has many literary associations: Edmund Spenser, from his manor at Kilcolman, referred to it and the gentle Mullagh (the Awbeg River) in The Faerie Queen ; Anthony Trollope passed through in his novel Castle Richmond; James Joyce played a game of hurling there in his Portrait of an Artist as a Young Man; the revered Canon Sheehan of Doneraile mentions Buttevant in several of his novels, not least in Glenanaar in the setting of the fatal events of the Fair of Rathclare; and Elizabeth Bowen mentions it in her elegiacal family history Bowen's Court.

Buttevant was the setting of the "Bunworth Banshee", a supernatural occurrence documented in Thomas Crofton Croker's Fairy Legends and Traditions of the South of Ireland (1825–1828).

Clotilde Augusta Inez Mary Graves, otherwise Clotilde Graves (1863–1932), the daughter of Major W.H. Graves and Antoinette Dean of Harwich, was born at Buttevant Castle on 3 June 1863. She was cousin of Alfred Perceval Graves, the father of the poet Robert Graves. Convent educated in Lourdes, she converted to Catholicism and had some success in London and New York as a playwright. In 1911, under the pseudonym of Richard Dehan, she published The Dop Doctor, which was made into a film in 1915 by Fred Paul.

In the Irish language, Peadar Ó Laoghaire makes unflattering mention of garrisoned Buttevant in Mo Scéal Féin. The 18th-century Irish antiquarian, Séamus Ó Conaire, one-time member of the Royal Society of Antiquaries, is buried westward facing outside of the friary portal.

== Transport ==
Buttevant and Doneraile railway station opened on 17 March 1849, but finally closed on 7 March 1977.

The station was the site of the Buttevant Rail Disaster on 1 August 1980. At 12:45 a CIÉ express train from Dublin to Cork entered Buttevant station at 70 mph (110 km/h) carrying some 230 Bank Holiday passengers. It careered into a siding and smashed into a stationary ballast train. The carriages immediately behind the engine and goods wagon jack-knifed and were thrown across four sets of rail-line. Two coaches and the dining car were totally demolished by the impact. It resulted in the deaths of 18 people and over 70 people were injured. The scale and impact of the accident meant that CIÉ, and the government, came under pressure to improve safety and modernise the rail fleet. A subsequent review resulted in the elimination of the wooden-bodied coaches that had formed part of the train. On the 25th anniversary of this accident, a commemorative service was held and a plaque in memory of the dead erected at Buttevant station.

== Sport ==
Buttevant GAA hosted Munster football championship games on and off until 1962.

== See also ==
- List of abbeys and priories in Ireland (County Cork)
- List of towns and villages in Ireland
- Market Houses in Ireland
