= Billy Hill (footballer) =

English footballer

Personal information
- Full name: William Hill
- Date of birth: 6 January 1936 (age 90)
- Place of birth: Sheffield, West Riding of Yorkshire, England
- Height: 5 ft 11 in (1.80 m)
- Position: Winger

Senior career*
Years	Team	Apps	(Gls)
–1954	Rawmarsh Welfare		
1954–1960	York City	29	(3)
1960–	Scarborough		
- Matlock Town
Total		29	(3)
- * Club domestic league appearances and goals

William Hill (born 6 January 1936), also known as Bill Hill, is an English former professional footballer who played as a winger in the Football League for York City and in non-League football for Rawmarsh Welfare, Scarborough and Matlock Town.
