= Scots Church, Cobh =

Former church in Cobh, Ireland, now a museum

Scots Church
- Séipéal na nAlbanach
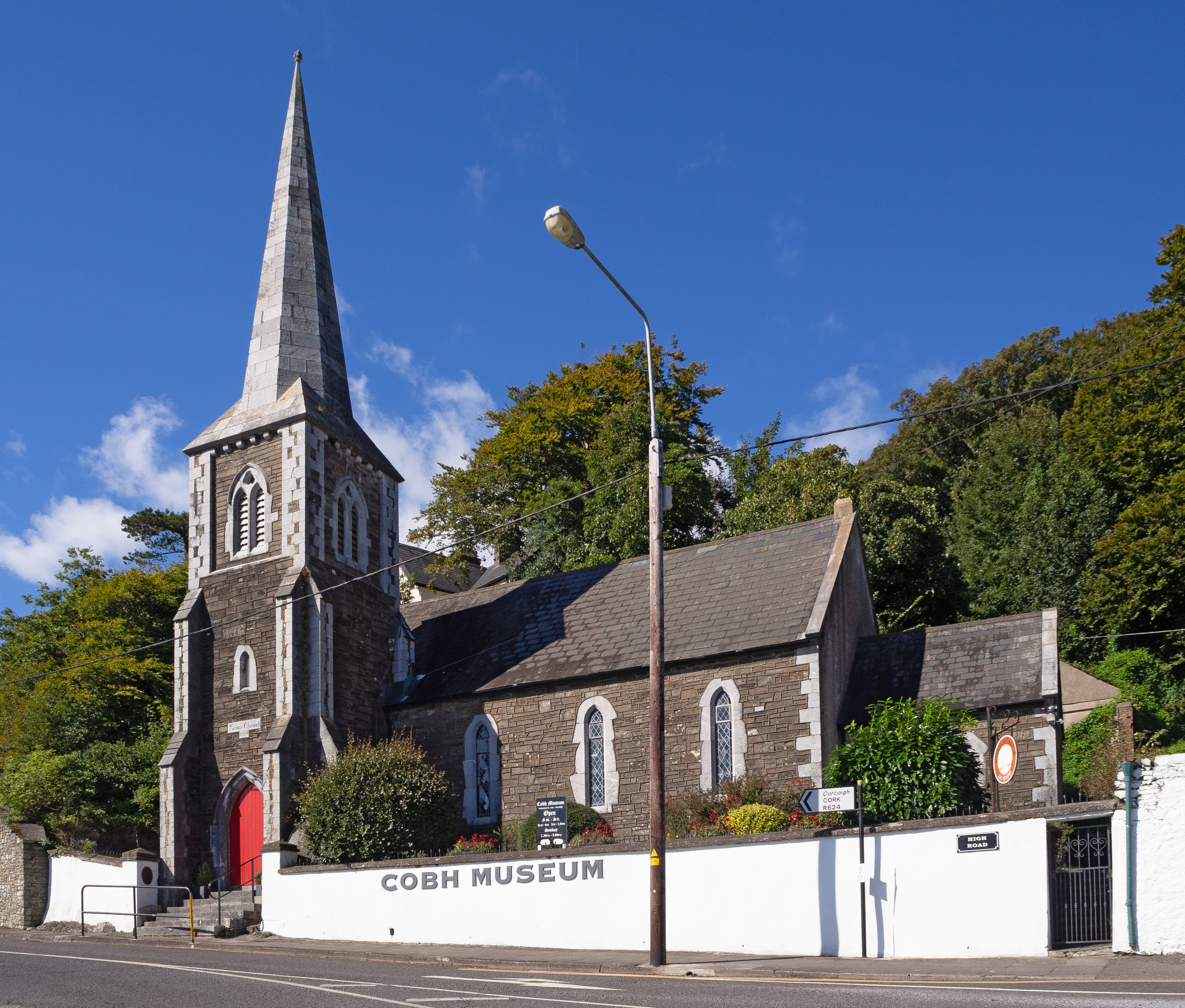

- Location within Ireland
- 51°50′58″N 8°17′58″W
- Location: Cobh, Ireland
- Denomination: Presbyterian

History
- Status: deconsecrated

Architecture
- Architect: Henry Hill
- Style: Gothic Revival
- Groundbreaking: 1853
- Completed: 1854

Specifications
- Materials: limestone, sandstone, terracotta, stained glass, timber

Administration
- Province: Presbyterian Church in Ireland

The Scots Church is a former Presbyterian church in Cobh, County Cork, Ireland. It is today a museum, the Cobh Museum, which tells the history of the town.

== Architecture ==
The building is in the "Hard" Gothic Revival style, with three-bay nave, single-bay vestry to east and a three-stage, stepped tower with an octagonal limestone spire with consoles to the south elevation. It was designed by Henry Hill.

== History ==
=== Church ===
The church was built in 1854. It closed in 1965, and was gifted to Cork County Library in 1973.

=== Museum ===
Cobh Museum
- Músaem an Chóibh
- Established: 1973
- Type: maritime museum
- Owner: Cork County Council (County Library Service)
- Public transit access: Cobh railway station
- Website: www.cobhmuseum.com

Cobh Museum opened in 1973. It tells the social and commercial history of Cove/Queenstown/Cobh, with a focus on maritime and military history. It contains artifacts from the RMS Lusitania.
