= The Montenotte Hotel =

Hotel in Cork, Ireland

Coordinates: 51.9045°N 8.452°W

The Montenotte Hotel is a four-star hotel in Cork, Ireland.

Built originally as a residence named Lee View House in the 1820s, the house was extended in the 1880s, and became the 'Lee View Hotel' in the 1940s. Operating as the 'Country Club Hotel' from 1960 until 2006, the hotel was renamed and redeveloped under its current name in the early 21st century.

In February 1980, U2 performed in the hotel as part of their U2-3 Tour. The cover photograph used on the U2 album "U218" and book "U2 by U2" was taken from the roof of the hotel by photographer David Corio.
