= The Hag of Beara =

Irish mythical figure

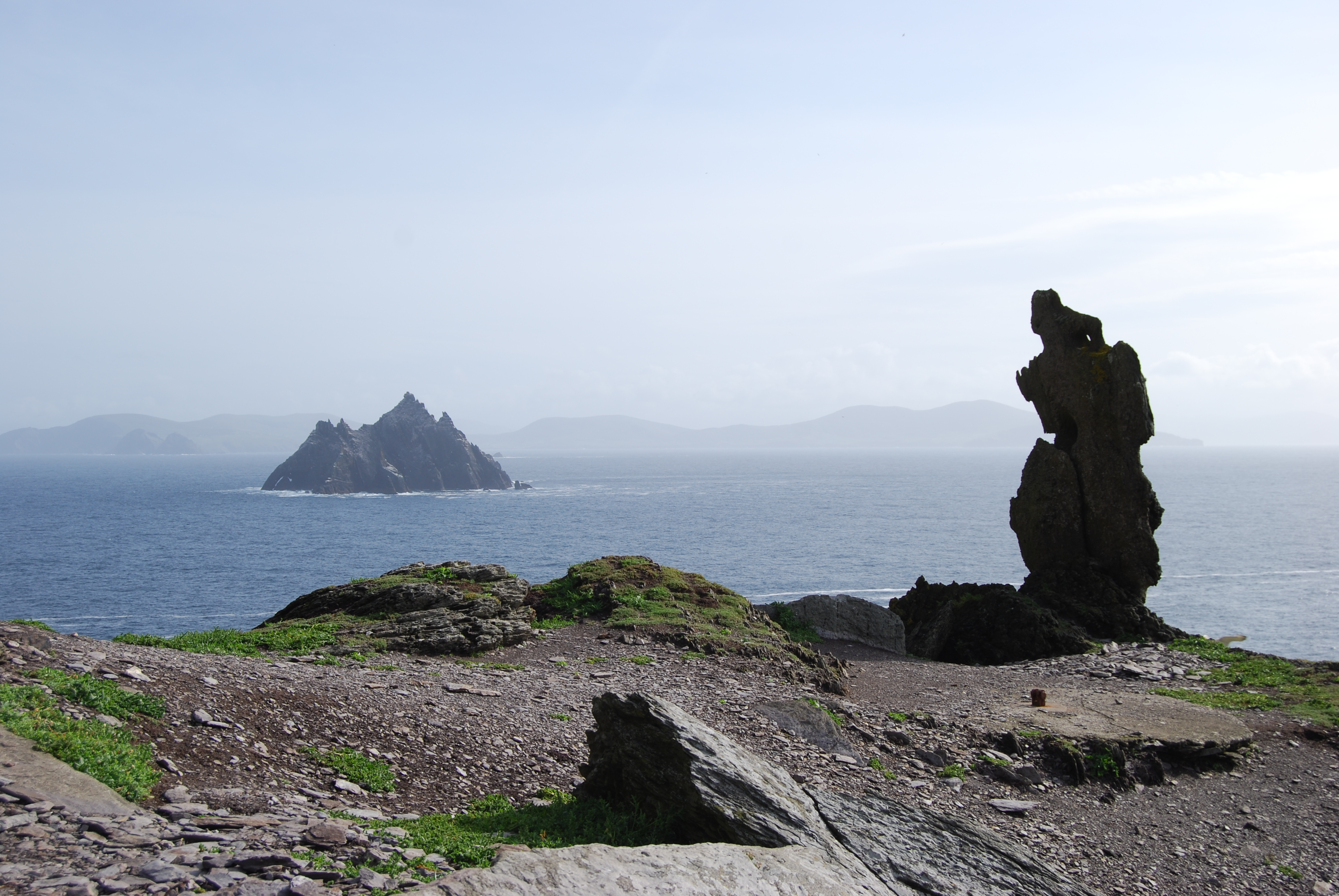
The "Wailing Woman", looking towards Little Skellig

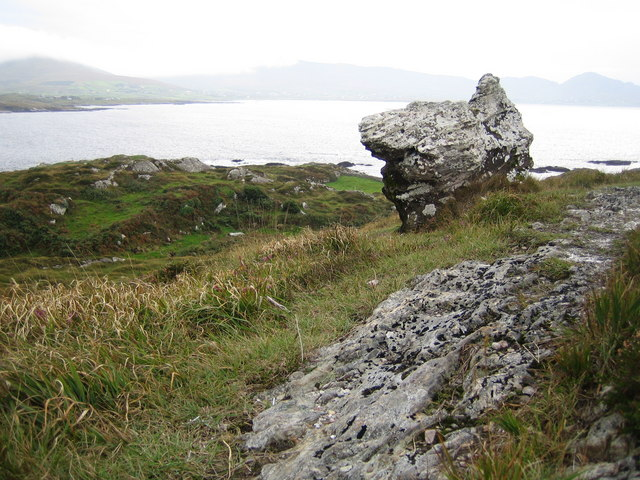
The Cailleach Beara, or Hag of Beara. According to legend, this rock represents the fossilized remains of the face of the Cailleach Beara, staring out at the ocean and awaiting her husband Manannán, God of the Sea, to return to her

The Hag of Beara (Irish: Cailleach Bhéarra, also known as The White Nun of Beara, The Cailleach or The Old Woman of Dingle) is a mythic Irish Goddess: a Cailleach, or divine hag, crone, or creator deity; literally the veiled one (caille translates as "veil"). She is associated with the Beara Peninsula in County Cork, Ireland, and was thought to bring winter. She is best known as the narrator of the medieval Irish poem "The Lament of the Hag of Beara", in which she bitterly laments the passing of her youth and her decrepit old age. The Great Book of Lecan (c. 1400 CE) contains a collection of stories concerning her.

The Hag of Beara is said to have been born in Dingle, County Kerry, at "Teach Mor" or the Great House, described as "the house farthest west in Ireland", and today identified as Tivore on the Dingle peninsula.

Along with County Kerry, she is also closely associated with County Cork. She is said to have been a mother or foster mother to the ancestors of a number of prominent clans in the region, including the Corca Dhuibhne and Corca Loighdhe. In some tellings, she lived several lives, or had several successive periods of youth, during which she birthed the ancestors of these clans.

== Literature ==
One of the earliest references to the hag is in the late 11th–early 12th century satire "Vision of Mac Conglinne", in which she appears in a list of eight people about whom lays are sung, as Caillech Bérre bán "a white nun, of Beare".

The untitled Middle Irish medieval poem of 35 verses, known as "The Lament of the Hag of Beara", has been described by folklorist Eleanor Hull as "a beautiful example of the wide-spread idea that human life is ruled by the flow and ebb of the sea-tide, with the turn of which life will dwindle, as with the on-coming tide it waxes to its full powers and energy". The narrator is clearly unhappy with her lot, and remembers that in her youth she spent her time "with kings, drinking mead and wine", but she now lives a lonely life in "the gloom of an oratory" among "shrivelled old hags".

The introductory text before the poem, recounts a few details. It tell us her name was Digdi /ˈdʲiɣʲðʰi/ and that she was of the Corcu Duibne, about whom Finan (perhaps Finan Cam) prophesied that their race "should never be without a famous illustrious woman", mentioning other famed women of the Corcu Duibne: "Brigit, the daughter of Iustan, Liadain, (Note: Meyer 1899, p. 121: A poetess (ban-éices) and the heroine of the tale Comracc Liadhaine ocus Cuirithir, copies of which are in H. 3. 18, pp. 759–761, and in Harl. 5280, fo. 26a.) the wife of Cuirither and Uallach, (Note: Meyer 1899, p. 121: A poetess who, according to the FM [Annals of the Four Masters], died in 932 CE. Her father’s name is Muimnechán in the FM.) the daughter of Muinegan". She is called "the Old Woman of Beare" because she had fifty foster-children in Beare. She had seven periods of youth, one after the other, outliving every man that lived with her, so that her descendants were tribes and races. For a hundred years she wore the veil (Old Irish caille) blessed by Cuimine, thereupon old age and infirmity came to her. Kuno Meyer identified this Cumine as "probably Cummine Fota, Bishop of Clonfert, who died in 661". Hull suggests that this blessed veil is a Christian appropriation of her hood, "for, as in many other cases, the pagan goddess reappears in later days as a Christian nun."

Two copies of the poem are found in the manuscript 1337/1-4 (H 3.18) held at Trinity College Dublin. Meyer published a critical edition of the poem and a full translation in Otia Merseiana (Note: Journal of the Arts Faculty of University College Liverpool.) in 1899. Eleanor Hull published a 19-verse poetic translation in 1912 and Lady Augusta Gregory contributed a 21-verse translation in 1919.

The following example verses are taken from Meyer.

[1] Athbe dam‑sæ bēs mara,
senta fomdera crōan:
tuirsi oca cē dogneō,
sona dotæt a loán.

[2] Is mí Caillech Bērre būoi,
nomeilinn léine mbithnūi
indiū tatham dom ṡēme,
nī melim cith athlēne.

[10] It fālte na hingena
ō thic dōib co beltene:
is dethbiriu dam‑sa brōn,
sech am trōg am sentane.

[22] Aminecān! mōr ūar dam!
cech dercān is erc[h]raide:
īar feis fri condlib sorchaib
bith i ndorchaib derrthaige!

[23] Rombūi denus la rīgu
ic ōl meda ocus fína:
indiū ibhim medcusce
itir sentanaib crína.

[35] Is sūaill mennotān andiū
aratabraim‑si aichni:
aní robōi for tuile
ataa uile for aithbe.

Ebb‑tide to me as of the sea!
Old age causes me reproach.
Though I make moan thereat—
Happiness comes out of fat.

I am the Old Woman of Beare that was,
An ever-new smock I used to wear :
To‑day—such is my mean state—
I wear not even a cast‑off smock.

The maidens rejoice
When May-day comes to them ;
For me sorrow is meeter,
For I am wretched, I am an old hag.

Amen! woe is me!
Every acorn has to drop.
After feasting by shining candles
To be in the darkness of a prayer-house!

I had my day with kings
Drinking mead and wine:
To‑day I drink whey-water
Among shrivelled old hags.

There is scarce a little place to‑day
That I can recognize:
What was on flood
Is all on ebb.

— Lament of the Old Woman of Beare

Patrick Pearse's poem Mise Éire, composed in 1912, mentions the cailleach in the opening and closing verses:

[1] Mise Éire:
Sine mé ioná an Ċailleaċ Ḃéarra.

[6] Mise Éire:
Uaigniġe mé ioná an Ċailleaċ Ḃéarra.

I am Ireland:
I am older than the Hag of Beara.

I am Ireland:
I am lonelier than the Hag of Beara.

— Patrick Pearse, Mise Éire (translation: Lady Gregory)

== Landmarks ==
Hag's Head, County Clare

A number of pre-historic archaeological and geographical features in Munster are associated with her, in particular the "Hag of Beara" rock chair, in reality a natural boulder, in Kilcatherine, Béara, County Cork, which is said to be either her fossilized remains, or the chair of which she sits waiting for Manannán mac Lir, the god of the sea, variously described as her husband or father.

She is sometimes associated with the Hag's Head (Ceann Caillí) rock formation on the southerly most point of the Cliffs of Moher in County Clare.

== See also ==
- Cailleach - a broader examination of the different versions of this type of deity, particularly in Scottish mythology

== Sources ==
- Gregory, Augusta (1919). The Kiltartan Poetry Book. New York: G. Putnam's Sons. pp. 68–71 – via The Internet Archive.
- Hull, Eleanor (1912). The Poem-Book of the Gael. London: Chatto & Windus. pp. 147–150 – via The Internet Archive.
- Hull, Eleanor (30 September 1927). "Legends and Traditions of the Cailleach Bheara or Old Woman (Hag) of Beare". Folklore. 38 (3): 225–254 – via JSTOR.
- Jackson, Kenneth Hurlstone, ed. (1990). Aislinge Meic Con Glinne. Dublin: Dublin Institute for Advanced Studies – via CELT. English translation
- Meyer, Kuno (1899). "Irish Stories and Songs: II. The Old Woman of Beare". Otia Merseiana. 1. University College of Liverpool: 119–128 – via The Internet Archive.
- O’Sullivan, Leanne (2013). "On the Beara Peninsula: Written in Stone". New Hibernia Review: Iris Éireannach Nua. 17 (3): 9–14 – via JSTOR.
- Zucchelli, Christine (2016). Sacred Stones of Ireland. Cork: Collins Press. ISBN 978-1-8488-9276-7.
- [unknown], Fergus (2 October 2017). "The Cailleach Béara or the Hag of Béara". The Irish Place. Archived from the original on 3 June 2023.
