= Cailleach =

Gaelic female hag deity

- landscape, storms and winter
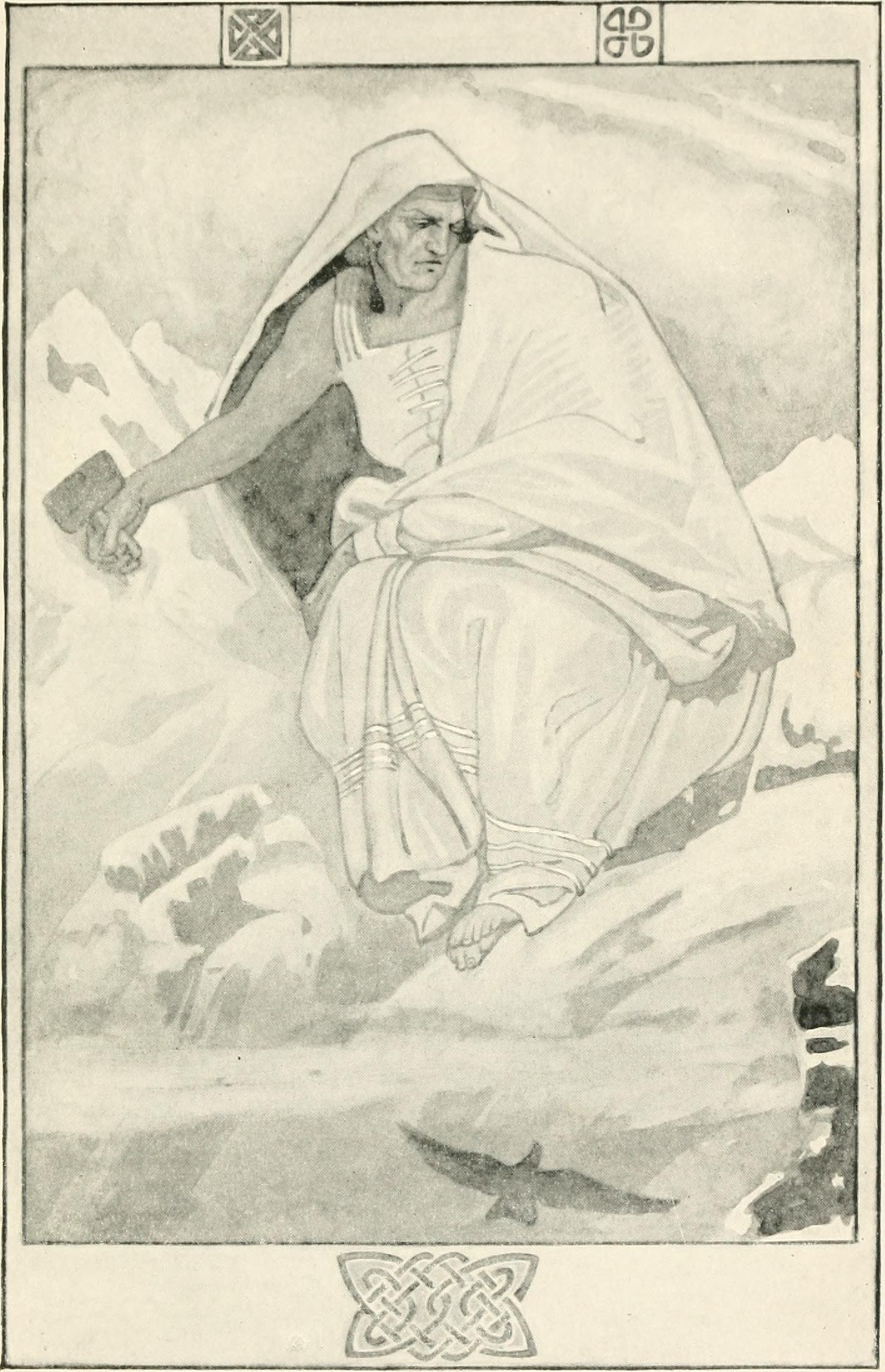
- Illustration by John Duncan in Wonder Tales from Scottish Myth and Legend (1917)
- Other names: Cailleach Bhéara (Irish); Cailleach Bheurra (Scottish Gaelic); Caillagh (Manx); The Hag of Beara; Beira, Queen of Winter
- Abodes: Labbacallee wedge tomb
- Texts: The Lament of the Old Woman; The Hunt of Slieve Cuilinn; Glas Gaibhnenn; The Hag of Beara
- Consorts: Mug Ruith; Bodach

In Gaelic (Irish, Scottish and Manx) myth, the Cailleach (Irish: [ˈkal̠ʲəx, kəˈl̠ʲax], Scottish Gaelic: [ˈkʰaʎəx]) is a divine hag, associated with the creation of the landscape and with the weather, especially storms and winter. The word literally means 'old woman, hag', and is found with this meaning in modern Irish and Scottish Gaelic, and has been applied to numerous mythological and folkloric figures in Ireland, Scotland, and the Isle of Man. In modern Irish folklore studies, she is sometimes known as The Hag of Beara, while in Scotland she is known as Beira, Queen of Winter.

== Name ==
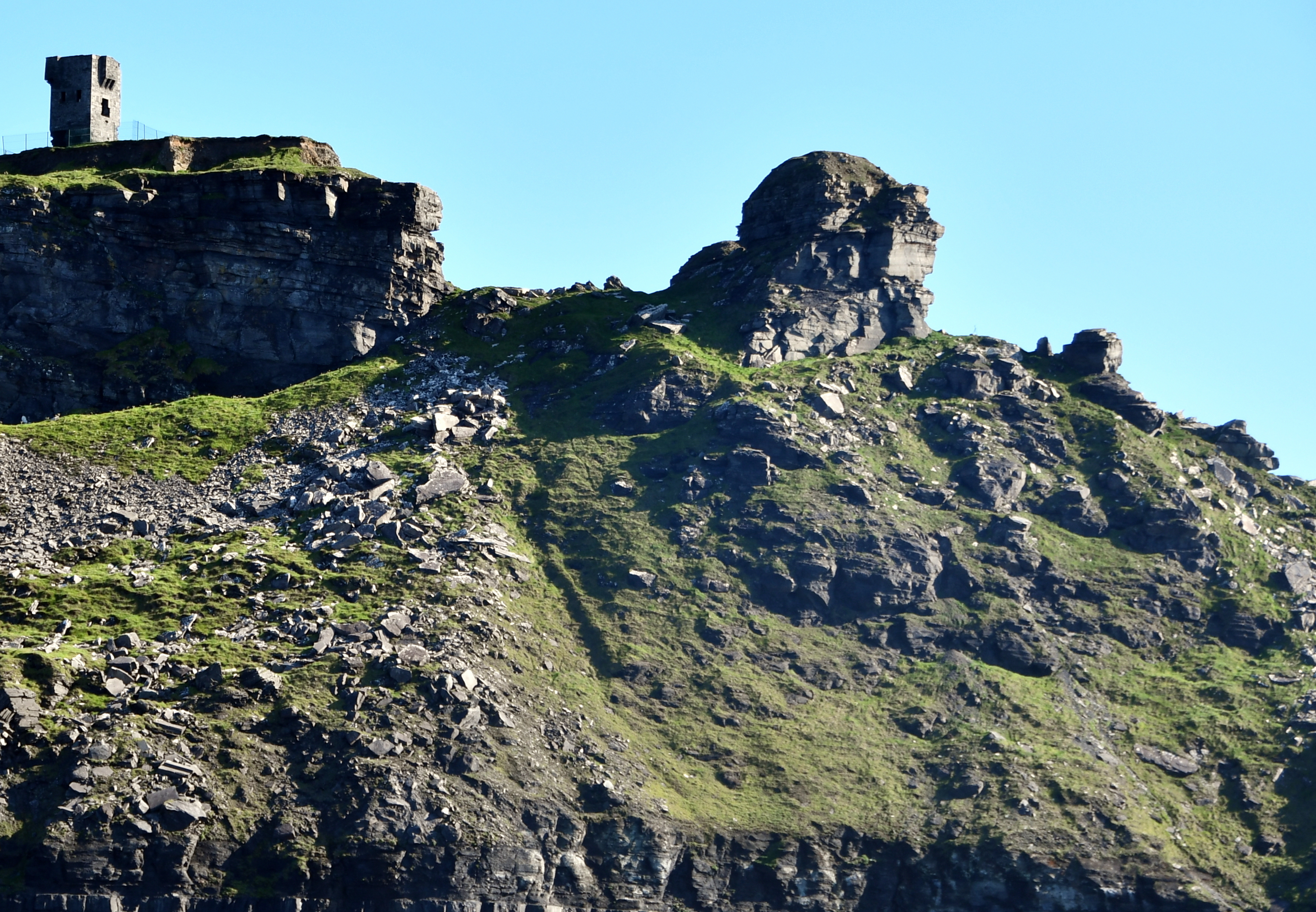
Ceann na Caill, The Hag's Head, on the southernmost tip of the Cliffs of Moher in County Clare. One of many locations named for the Cailleach.

Cailleach ('old woman' or 'hag' in modern Irish and Scottish Gaelic) comes from the Old Irish Caillech ('veiled one'), an adjectival form of caille ('veil'), an early loan from Latin pallium, 'woollen cloak'.

The Cailleach is often referred to as the Cailleach Bhéarra in Irish and Cailleach Bheurra in Scottish Gaelic. Gearóid Ó Crualaoich believes this comes from a word meaning 'sharp, shrill, inimical' – bior or beur – and refers to the Cailleach's association with winter and wilderness, as well as her association with horned beasts or cattle. Nollaig Ó Muraíle mentions a colleague discovering a south-west Kerry dialect word béarach used to designate "rocks on the sea-shore against which the sea breaks with great force" and suggests this as an original meaning. However, the earlier forms of the word has a slender ending, not a broad one: Béirre (Ó Muraíle), "Bérre, gen. Bérri, dat. Bérriu" (Meyer).

The 8th- to 9th-century Irish poem The Lament of the Old Woman says that the Cailleach's name is Digdi /ˈdʲiɣʲðʰi/ or Digde /ˈdʲiɣʲðʰe/. In The Hunt of Slieve Cuilinn she is called Milucra, sister of Áine. In the tale of the Glas Gaibhnenn, she is called Biróg. Elsewhere, she is called Bui or Bua[ch]. In Manx Gaelic she is known as the Caillagh.

The plural of cailleach is cailleacha (pronounced [kɪˈl̠ʲaxə, ˈkal̠ʲəxə]) in Irish, cailleachan (pronounced [ˈkʰaʎəxən]) in Scottish Gaelic, and caillaghyn in Manx. The word is found as a component in terms like the Gaelic cailleach-dhubh ('nun') and cailleach-oidhche ('owl'), as well as the Irish cailleach feasa ('wise woman, fortune-teller') and cailleach phiseogach ('sorceress, charm-worker'). Related words include the Gaelic caileag and the Irish cailín ('young woman, girl, colleen'), the diminutive of caile 'woman', and the Lowland Scots carline/carlin ('old woman, witch'). A more obscure word that is sometimes interpreted as 'hag' is the Irish síle, which has led some to speculate on a connection between the Cailleach and the stone carvings of Sheela na Gigs.

== Legends ==
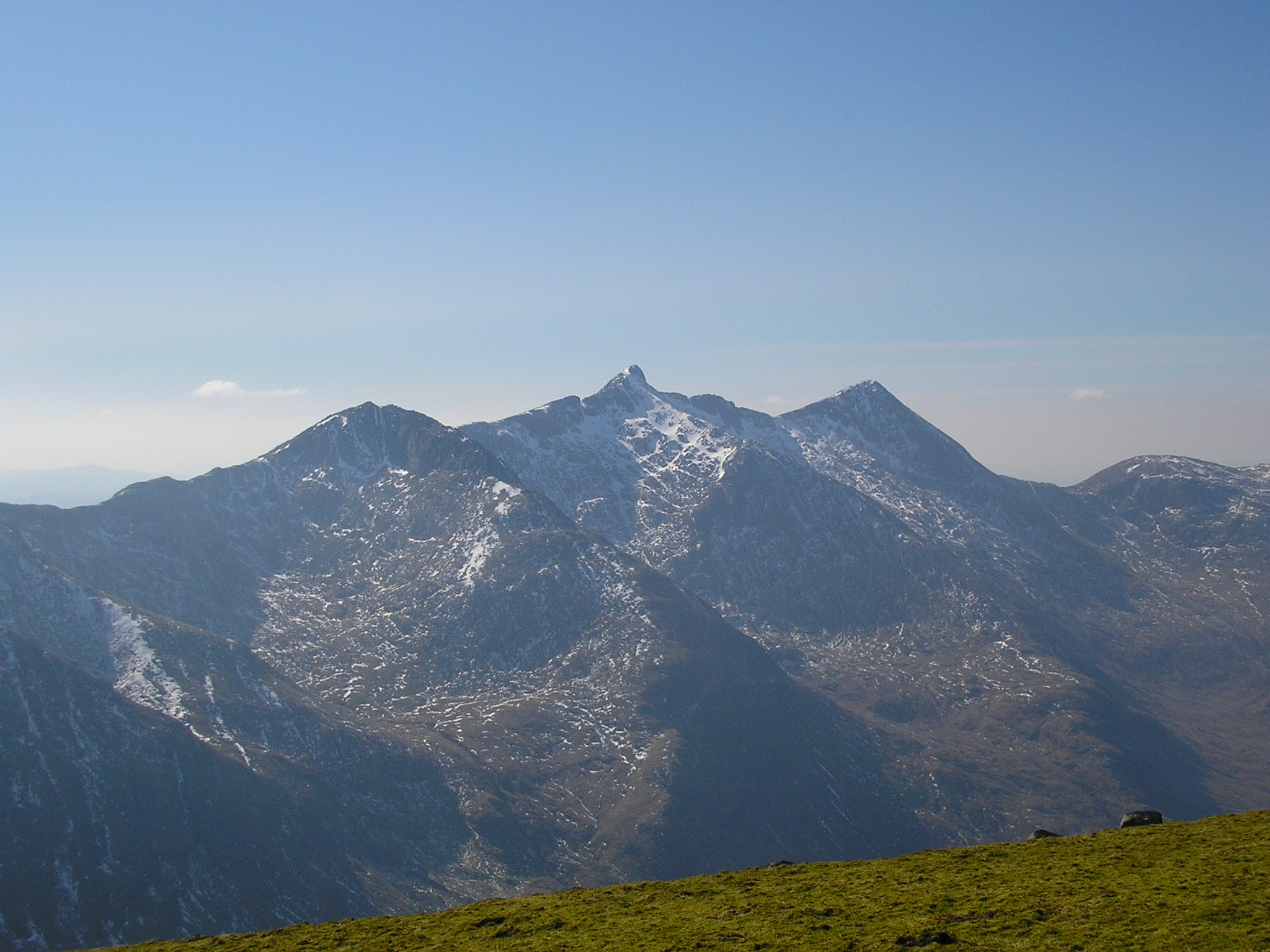
Ben Cruachan, highest point in Argyll and Bute, home of the Cailleach nan Cruachan

In Scotland, where she is also known as Beira, Queen of Winter (a name given by 20th-century folklorist Donald Alexander Mackenzie), she is credited with making numerous mountains and large hills, which are said to have been formed when she was striding across the land and accidentally dropped rocks from her creel or wicker basket. In other cases she is said to have built the mountains intentionally, to serve as her stepping stones. She carries a hammer for shaping the hills and valleys, and is said to be the mother of all the goddesses and gods. According to Mackenzie, Beira was a one-eyed giantess with white hair, dark blue skin, and rust-colored teeth.

The Cailleach displays several traits befitting the personification of winter: she herds deer, she fights spring, and her staff freezes the ground.

In partnership with the goddess Brìghde, the Cailleach is seen as a seasonal deity or spirit, ruling the winter months between Samhainn (5 November or first day of Samhain) and Bealltainn (1 May or first day of summer), while Brìghde rules the summer months between Bealltainn and Samhainn. Some interpretations have the Cailleach and Brìghde as two faces of the same goddess, while others describe the Cailleach as turning to stone on Bealltainn and reverting to humanoid form on Samhainn in time to rule over the winter months. Depending on local climate, the transfer of power between the winter goddess and the summer goddess is celebrated any time between Là Fhèill Brìghde (Imbolc, 1 February) at the earliest, Latha na Cailliche (25 March), or Bealltainn (1 May) at the latest, and the local festivals marking the arrival of the first signs of spring may be named after either the Cailleach or Brìghde.

Là Fhèill Brìghde is also the day the Cailleach gathers her firewood for the rest of the winter. Legend has it that if she intends to make the winter last a good while longer, she will make sure the weather on 1 February is bright and sunny, so she can gather plenty of firewood to keep herself warm in the coming months. As a result, people are generally relieved if Là Fhèill Brìghde is a day of foul weather, as it means the Cailleach is asleep, will soon run out of firewood, and therefore winter is almost over. On the Isle of Man, where She is known as Caillagh ny Groamagh, the Cailleach is said to have been seen on St. Bride's day in the form of a gigantic bird, carrying sticks in her beak.

According to Mackenzie, the longest night of the year marked the end of her reign as Queen of Winter, at which time she visited the Well of Youth and, after drinking its magic water, grew younger day by day.

In Scotland, the Cailleachan (lit. 'old women') are also known as the Storm Hags, and seen as personifications of the elemental powers of nature, especially in a destructive aspect. They are said to be particularly active in raising the windstorms of spring, during the period known as A' Chailleach.

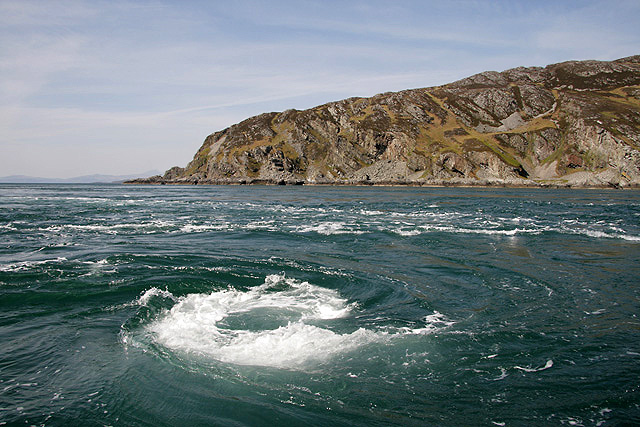
The Corryvreckan whirlpool (Scottish Gaelic: Coire Bhreacain - 'whirlpool/cauldron of the plaid') washtub of the Cailleach

On the west coast of Scotland, the Cailleach ushers in winter by washing her great plaid (Gaelic: féileadh mòr) in the Gulf of Corryvreckan (Gaelic: Coire Bhreacain - 'whirlpool/cauldron of the plaid'). This process is said to take three days, during which the roar of the coming tempest is heard as far away as twenty miles (32 km) inland. When she is finished, her plaid is pure white and snow covers the land.

In Scotland and Ireland, the first farmer to finish the grain harvest made a corn dolly, representing the Cailleach (also called "the Carlin or Carline"), from the last sheaf of the crop. The figure would then be tossed into the field of a neighbor who had not yet finished bringing in their grain. The last farmer to finish had the responsibility to take in and care for the corn dolly for the next year, with the implication they'd have to feed and house the hag all winter. Competition was fierce to avoid having to take in the Old Woman.

Some scholars believe the Old Irish poem "The Lament of the Old Woman of Beara" is about the Cailleach; Kuno Meyer states, "she had fifty foster-children in Beare. She had seven periods of youth one after another, so that every man who had lived with her came to die of old age, and her grandsons and great-grandsons were tribes and races."

=== Ireland ===
In Ireland, the Cailleach is associated with craggy, prominent mountains and outcroppings, such as Hag's Head (Irish: Ceann Caillí, meaning 'hag's head') the southernmost tip of the Cliffs of Moher in County Clare.

Labbacallee wedge tomb (Irish: Leaba Chaillí, meaning 'the hag's bed') is located near Glanworth, County Cork and is, according to folklore, the Cailleach's grave and former dwelling where she lived with her husband, Mogh Ruith, who she threw a boulder at, pinning him to the floor of the River Funshion.

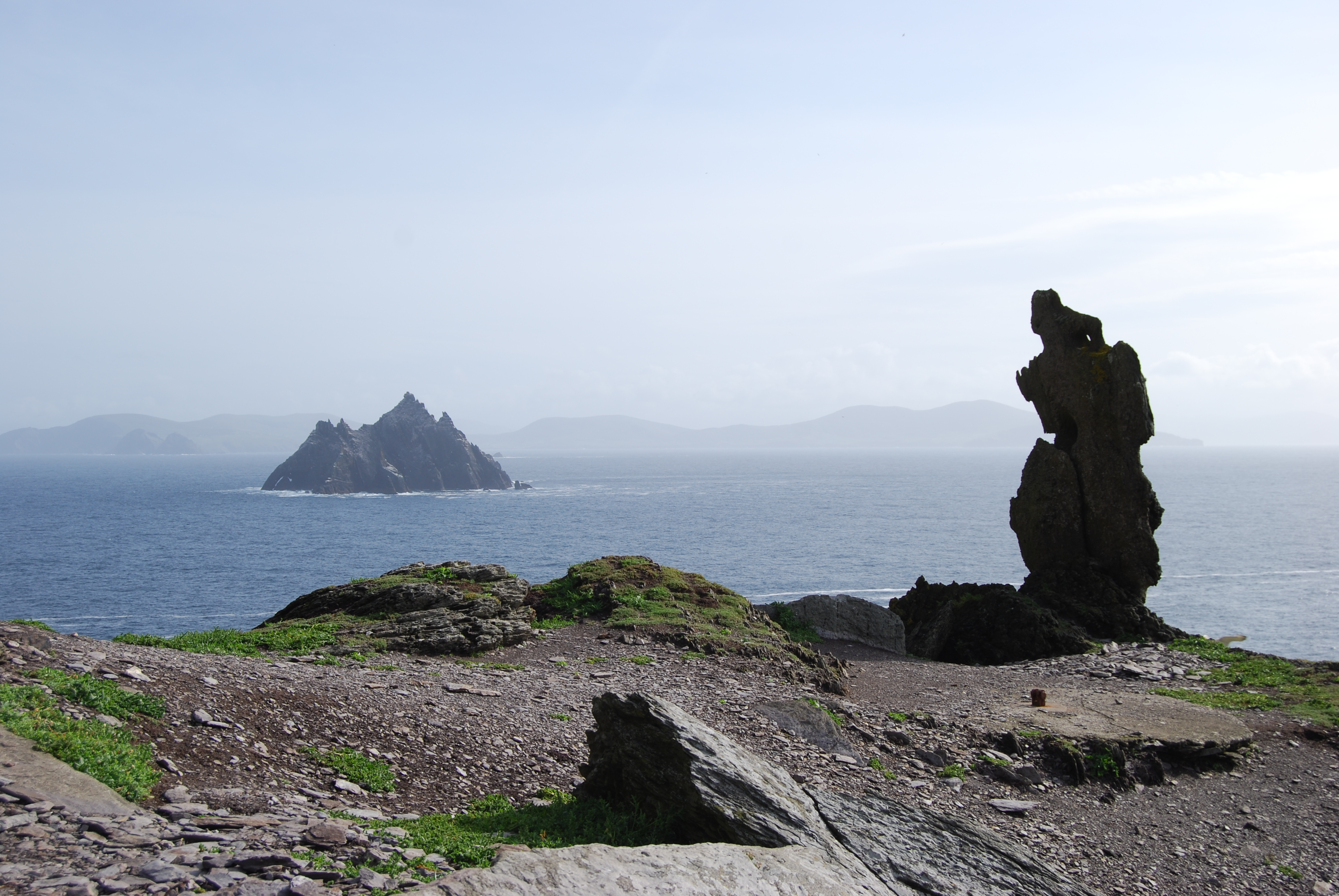
The 'Wailing Woman' rock on Skellig Michael, County Kerry, is associated with The Hag of Beara

There is a rock on the Beara Peninsula in West Cork at Kilcatherine said to resemble the Cailleach. In mythology she is said to have leapt across the bay from Coulagh to its present location.

The megalithic tombs at Loughcrew in County Meath are situated atop Slieve na Calliagh (Irish: Sliabh na Caillí, meaning 'the hag's mountain') and include a kerbstone known as "the hag's chair". Cairn T on Slieve na Calliagh is a classic passage tomb, in which the rays of the equinox sunrise shine down the passageway and illuminate an inner chamber filled with megalithic stone carvings.

The summit of Slieve Gullion in County Armagh features a passage tomb known locally as the 'Calliagh Beara's House'. There is also a lake, where the Calliagh is said to have played a trick on the mythical warrior, Fionn mac Cumhaill, when he took on the physical appearance of an old man after diving into the lake to retrieve a ring that the Calliagh fooled him into thinking was lost.

Aillenacally (Aill na Caillí, "Hag Cliff") is a cliff in County Galway.

The Carrowmore passage tombs on the Cúil Iorra Peninsula in County Sligo, are associated with the Cailleach. One is called the Cailleach a Bhéara's House. William Butler Yeats refers to the Sligo Cailleach as the 'Clooth na Bare'. In County Sligo she is also called the Garavogue Cailleach.

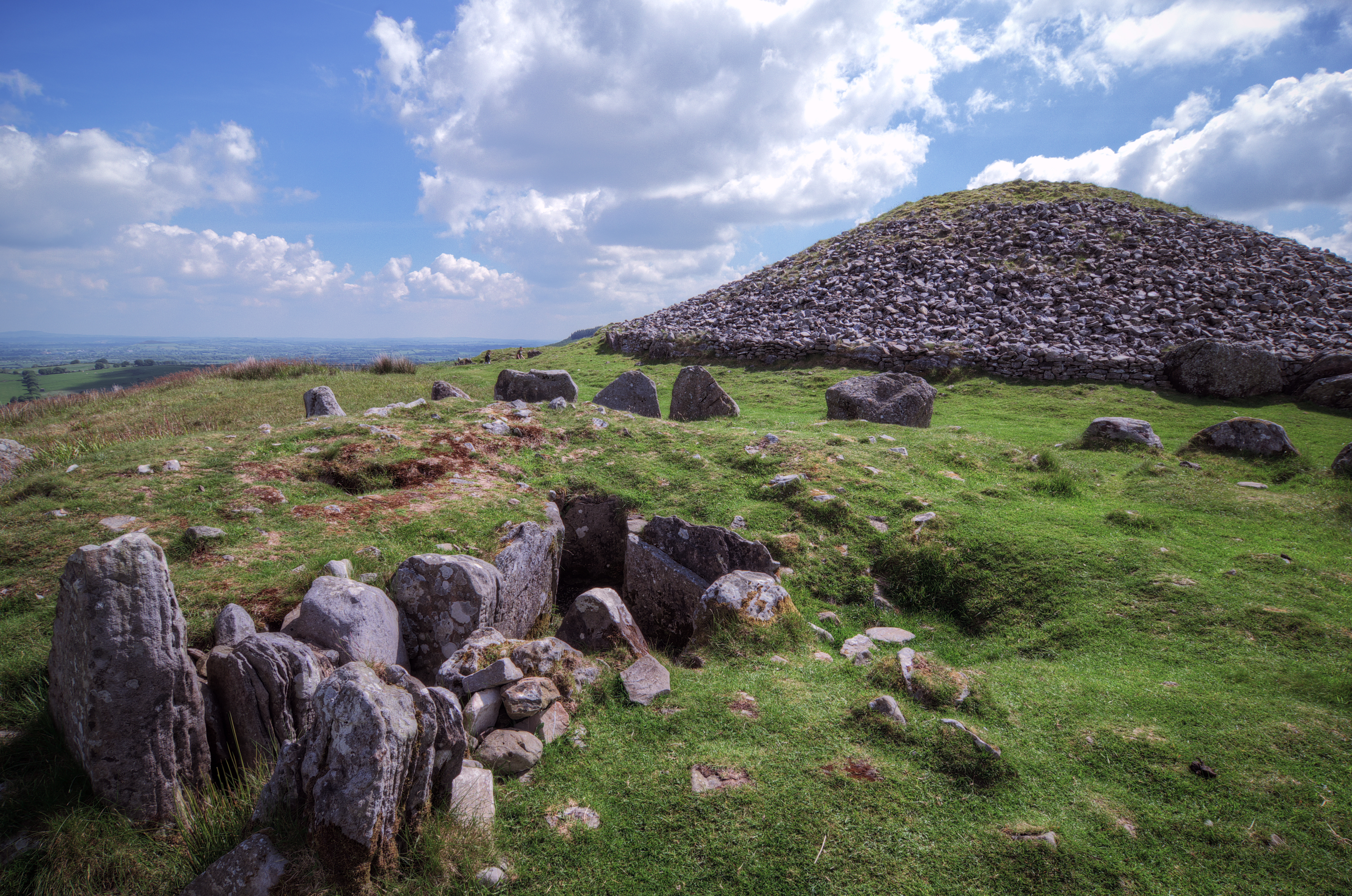
Remains of passage tombs on Slieve na Calliagh, County Meath

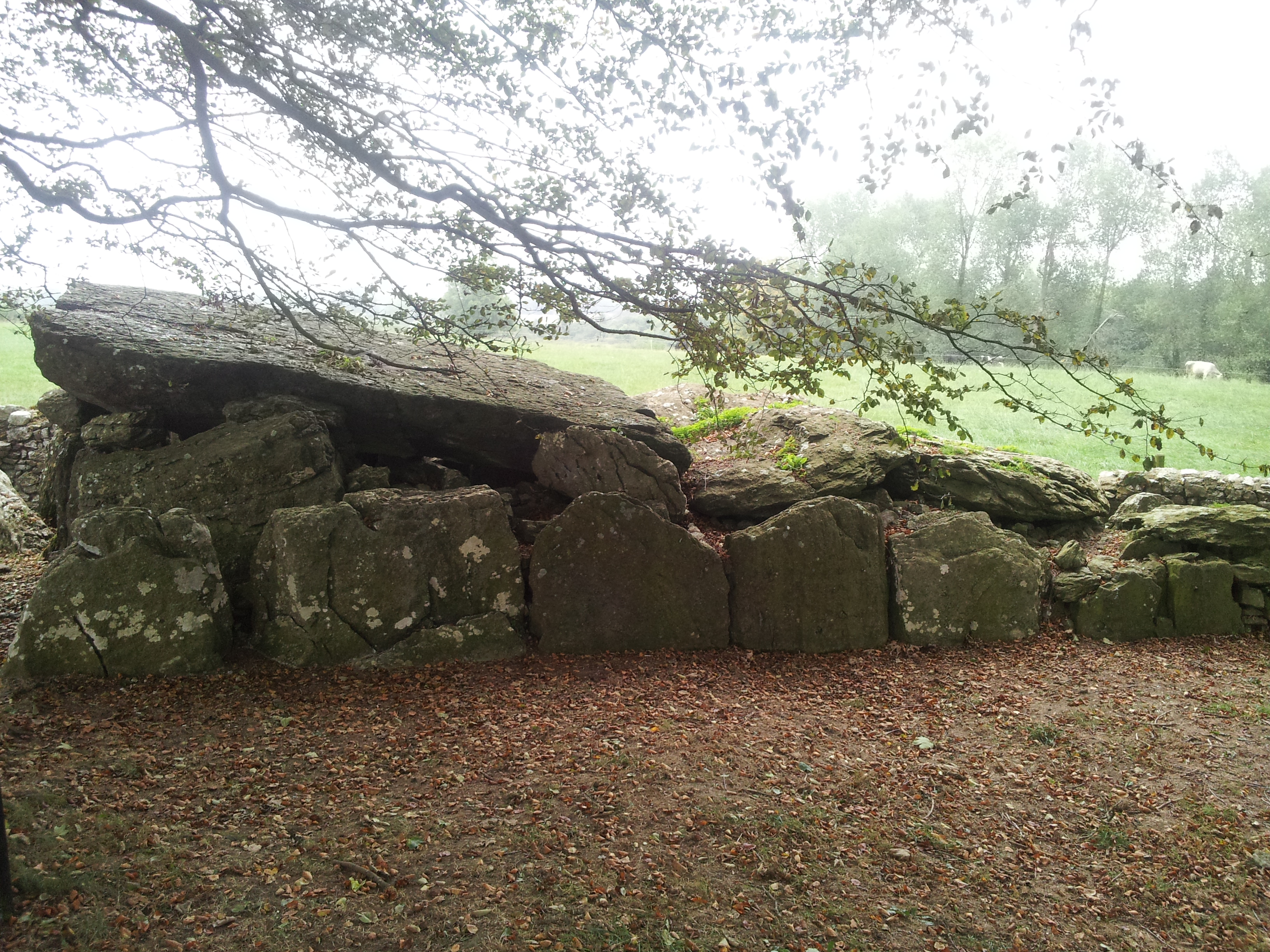
Labbacallee wedge tomb or "The Hag's Bed", near Glanworth, County Cork

=== Scotland ===
The Cailleach is prominent in the landscape of Argyll and Bute, Scotland. In later tales she is known as the Cailleach nan Cruachan ("the witch of Ben Cruachan"). Ben Cruachan is the tallest mountain in the region. Tea-towels and postcards of her are sold in the visitor shop for the Hollow Mountain, which also features a mural depicting her accidental creation of Loch Awe. Legend has it that the Cailleach was tired from a long day herding deer. Atop Ben Cruachan she fell asleep on her watch and a well she was tending overflowed, running down from the highlands and flooding the valleys below, forming first a river and then the loch. The overflowing well is a common motif in local Gaelic creation tales - as seen in the goddess Boann's similar creation of the River Boyne in Ireland. Other connections to the region include her above-mentioned strong ties with the fierce whirlpool in the Gulf of Corryvreckan.

She is also associated with other Scottish mountains. Ben Nevis was said to be her "mountain throne". The two mountains on the Isle of Skye named Beinn na Caillich (western and eastern) after her, from which fierce storms of sleet and rain descend, wreaking havoc and destruction upon the lands below.

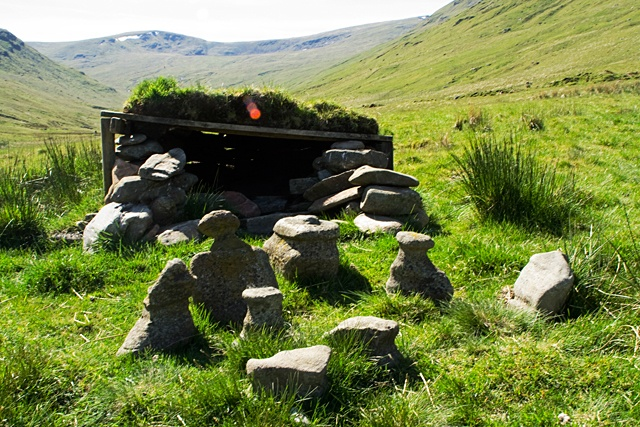
Tigh nan Cailleach, near Glen Lyon in Perthshire, Scotland

There is a Gleann Cailliche in Glen Lyon in Perthshire with a stream named Allt Cailliche which runs into Loch Lyon. This area is famous for a pagan ritual which according to legend is associated to the Cailleach. There is a small shieling in the Glen, known as either Tigh nan Cailleach (Scottish Gaelic for house of the old women) or Tigh nam Bodach, (Scottish Gaelic for house of the old men), which houses a number of heavy water-worn stones, resembling miniature human beings. Roughly rectangular, the building originally measured 2m by 1.3m by 0.4m high with a stone roof. A replacement roof of a wooden pallet having collapsed and the whole building having become somewhat ruinous it was rebuilt by a local dyker in 2011.

According to local legend the stones represent the Cailleach, her husband the Bodach, and their children and the site may represent the only surviving shrine of its kind in Great Britain. The local legend suggests that the Cailleach and her family were given shelter in the glen by the locals and while they stayed there the glen was always fertile and prosperous. When they left they gave the stones to the locals with the promise that as long as the stones were put out to look over the glen at Bealltainn and put back into the shelter and made secure for the winter at Samhain then the glen would continue to be fertile. This ritual is still carried out to this day.

== In popular culture ==
- In Scottish Gaelic literature, the Cailleach was famously used to personify the internal literary critic of 18th-century poet William Ross. Despite being widely viewed as a, "love-lorn romantic who died of unrequited love", due to the poet's many versifications of his loss and heartbreak over the 1782 marriage of his beloved Mòr Ros, Ross was also capable of poking fun at himself, as in the self-flyting poem Oran eadar am Bàrd agus Cailleach-mhilleadh-nan-dàn ("Exchange of Verses between the Poet and the Hag-who-spoils-poems").
- According to American ethnomusicologist Amy Murray, the Gaels of the Outer Hebrides sometimes referred to Queen Victoria as "A' chailleach a-stùiradh" ("The Hag that's steering").
- Morna Young's dramatisation of Hans Christian Anderson's The Snow Queen, produced by the Lyceum Theatre Company, Edinburgh, in November/December 2023, conflates the characters of Beira, Queen of Winter, and the Snow Queen.
- A character named Cailleach appears in two episodes of the fourth season of the British BBC television series Merlin. According to the plot, Cailleach is a powerful deity in the Old Religion. She serves as the Gatekeeper to the Spirit World.
- A version of the Cailleach appears in the 1978 Doctor Who story The Stones of Blood, impersonated by a long-lived alien and worshipped by a modern druid cult.
- The antagonist in the 2026 movie Hokum is a Anglican syncretism of a Cailleach.

== See also ==
- Baba Yaga
- Banshee
- Befana
- Bodach
- Carlin stone
- Carrauntoohil
- Celtic animism
- Cyhyraeth
- Imbolc
- Labbacallee wedge tomb
- Perchta
- Sheela na Gig
- Slieve Gullion
- Tempestarii

== Primary sources ==
- "The Lament of the Old Woman of Beare", ed. and tr. Donncha Ó hAodha (1989). "The Lament of the Old Woman of Beare". In Donnchadh Ó Corráin, Liam Breatnach and Kim McCone (ed.). Sages, Saints and Storytellers: Celtic studies in Honour of Professor James Carney. Maynooth Monographs 2. Maynooth: An Sagart. pp. 308–31.
