= Carlin stone =

Name of many stones in Scotland

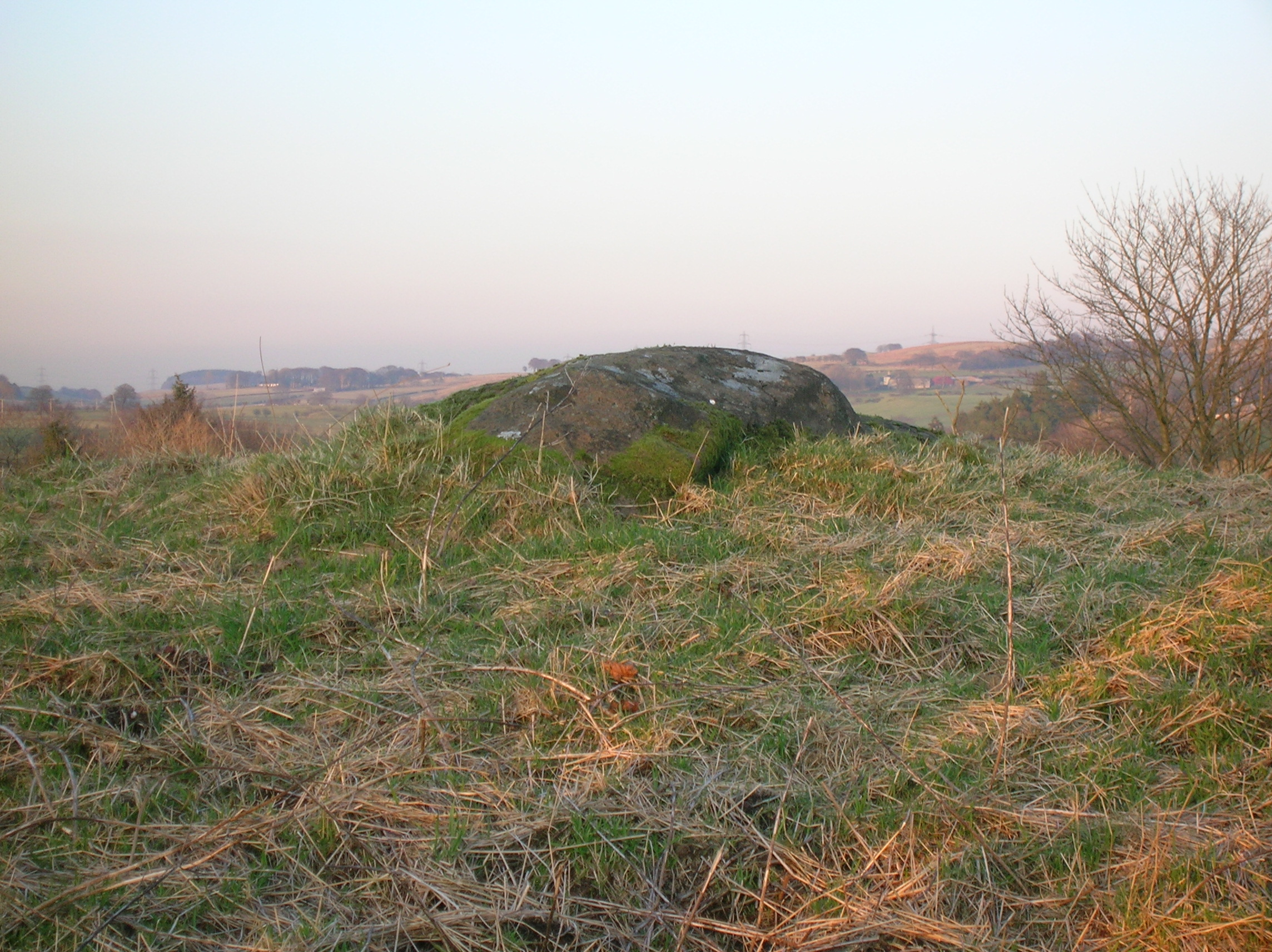
The Carlin stone from the Commoncraigs Community Woodland, East Ayrshire, Scotland

Carlin Stone or Carline Stane is the name given to a number of prehistoric standing stones and natural stone or landscape features in Scotland. The significance of the name is unclear, other than its association with old hags, witches, and the legends of the Cailleach.

== Etymology ==
A 'Carle' in Scots is a commoner, a husband or in a derogatory sense, a churl or male of low birth. The name 'Carline', 'Cairlin', Carlin, 'Cyarlin', 'Kerlin' or 'Kerl' was also used in lowland Scots as a derogatory term for an old woman meaning an 'old hag'. It is from Old Norse Kerling or a corruption or equivalent in Scots of the Gaelic word “Cailleach”, meaning a witch or the 'old Hag', the Goddess of Winter.

Carlin is used as a surname and has several variations e.g., Carlen, Carlon, Carolan, O'Carlin, O'Carlen, O'Carlon, O'Carolan, Carling, Carlton, etc. It is stated as being of Irish Gaelic origin and is found somewhat less frequently in Scotland.

== Scottish sites of Carlin stones or natural features ==
=== Carlin Skerry, Orkney ===
This is a rocky islet in the South of Orkney.

=== Alvah, Aberdeenshire ===
Near Sandlaw Farm in the parish of Alvah is the Carlin Cist, thought to have been part of a Cromlech at one time.

=== Backhill of Drachlaw, Aberdeenshire ===
This stone was part of a recumbent stone circle, around 95 ft (29 m) in diameter. It has several alternative names, such as the Caerlin stone; Cairn Riv; Cairn Rib; or Cairn-Rieve. Its map reference in the parish of Inverkeithny is NJ 6744 4659. Three stones remain in line, the Carlin Stone between two others quite small in comparison. In addition, there are two set stones projecting inward from the Carlin Stone. This boulder is rugged, unshapely, and most unusual in height. Other stones were broken up and removed within relatively recent times; the mounds of stones being carted away for making dikes or drystone walls. In or near the circle were found a small perforated axe-hammer, portions of 3 bronze armlets, flint chips and a jet button.

=== Bishop Hill, Perth and Kinross ===
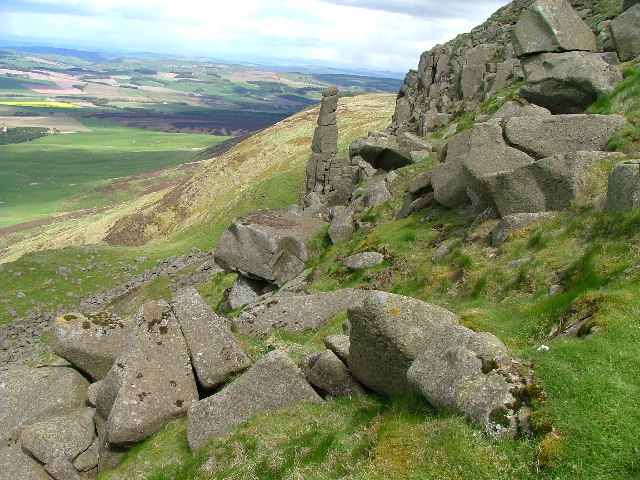
Carlin Maggie

This natural stone outcrop is known as Carlin Maggie and has the look of something imported from Easter Island, but it is natural. It is said to be a witch turned to stone by the Devil after she got on his nerves (carline is an old Scots word for 'witch'). The Devil threw a lightning bolt which had the effect of petrifying her. It is a rock pillar estimated to be 30 feet (9.1 m) high, on the Western slope of Bishop Hill, overlooking Loch Leven. The OS grid reference is NO 18403 04413.

=== Balgair Muir, Stirlingshire ===
A "Carlin Stone" is marked on the OS 6 inch series of maps from 1843 to 1882 at this location approximately 5 km NNW of Fintry.

=== Dunlop, North Ayrshire ===
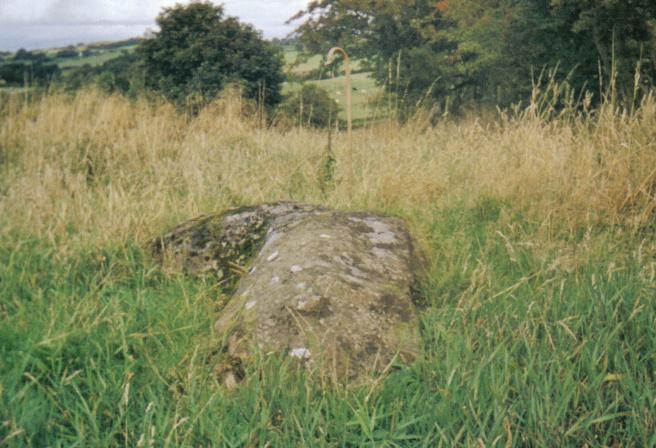
A view of the Carlin or Hag's stone in Dunlop.

On top of the Common Crags overlooking the village of Dunlop and the Glazert Water is a large procumbent boulder known on the OS map as the ‘Carlin’s Stone or Stane’. It is also known locally as the Hag's Stone.

It is not listed by the RCAHMS and is not as well known locally as the nearby megalith known as the Thurgartstone. 55°42′47.9″N 4°31′20.6″W

=== Darvel, East Ayrshire ===
Two farms named High Carlincraig and Low Carlincraig' on the Ordnance Survey maps are to be found above Darvel in East Ayrshire.

=== Waterside, East Ayrshire ===
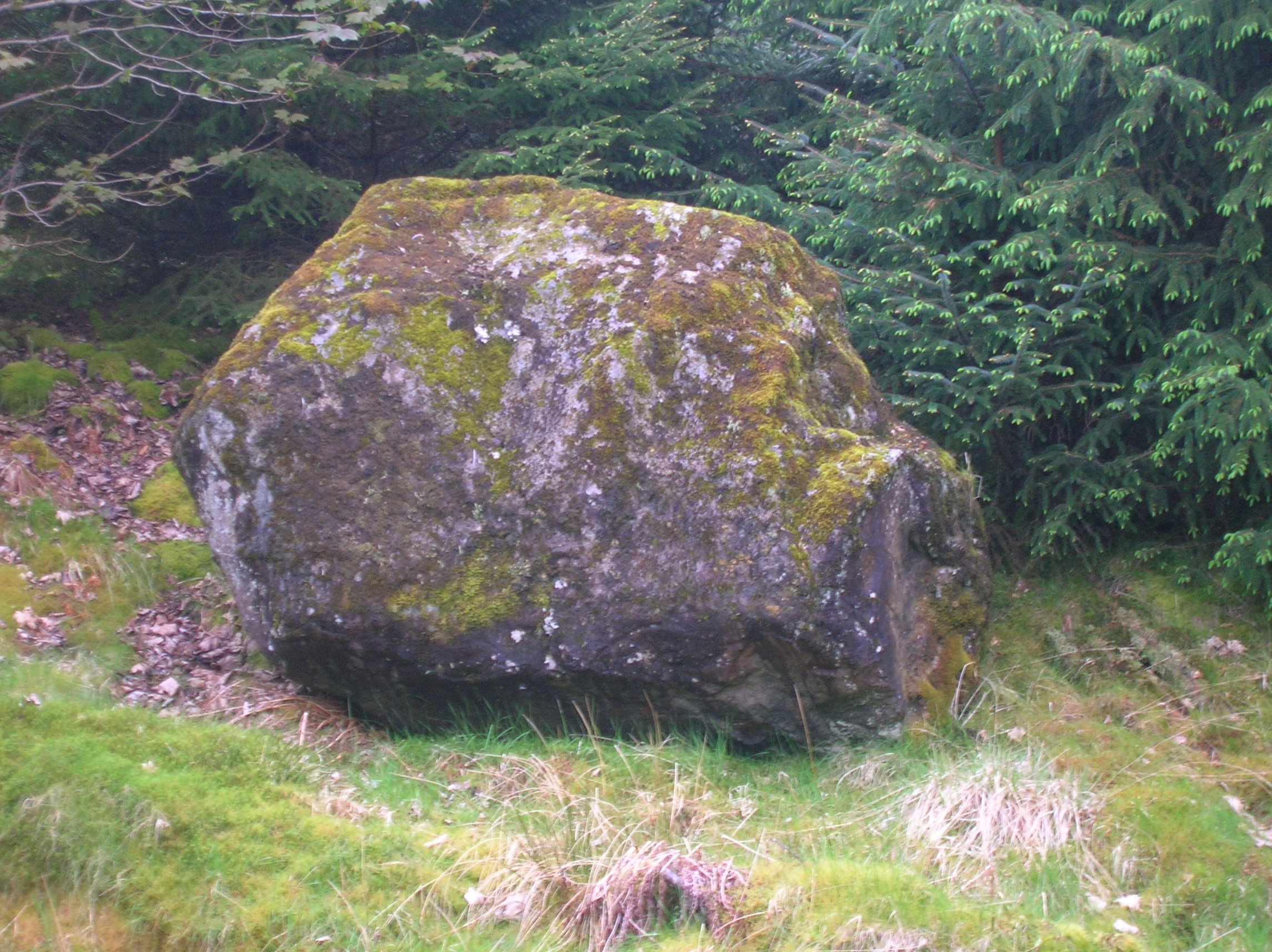
The Carlin Stone near Craigends Farm.

A Carlin Stone is situated on Whitelee Moor near Craigends Farm, below Cameron's Moss near Waterside in East Ayrshire. A nearby watercourse is known as the Carlin Burn, joining the Hareshawmuir water just below the site of the Carlin stone. The stone has been much visited in the past; indicated by the remains of a footbridge running to it across the Hareshawmuir Water.55°39′34.6″N 4°20′59.7″W

=== Knockshinnoch, East Ayrshire ===
Carlin knowe is a low hill with a prehistoric cairn on its summit near Knockshinnoch farm.

=== Eaglesham, East Renfrewshire ===
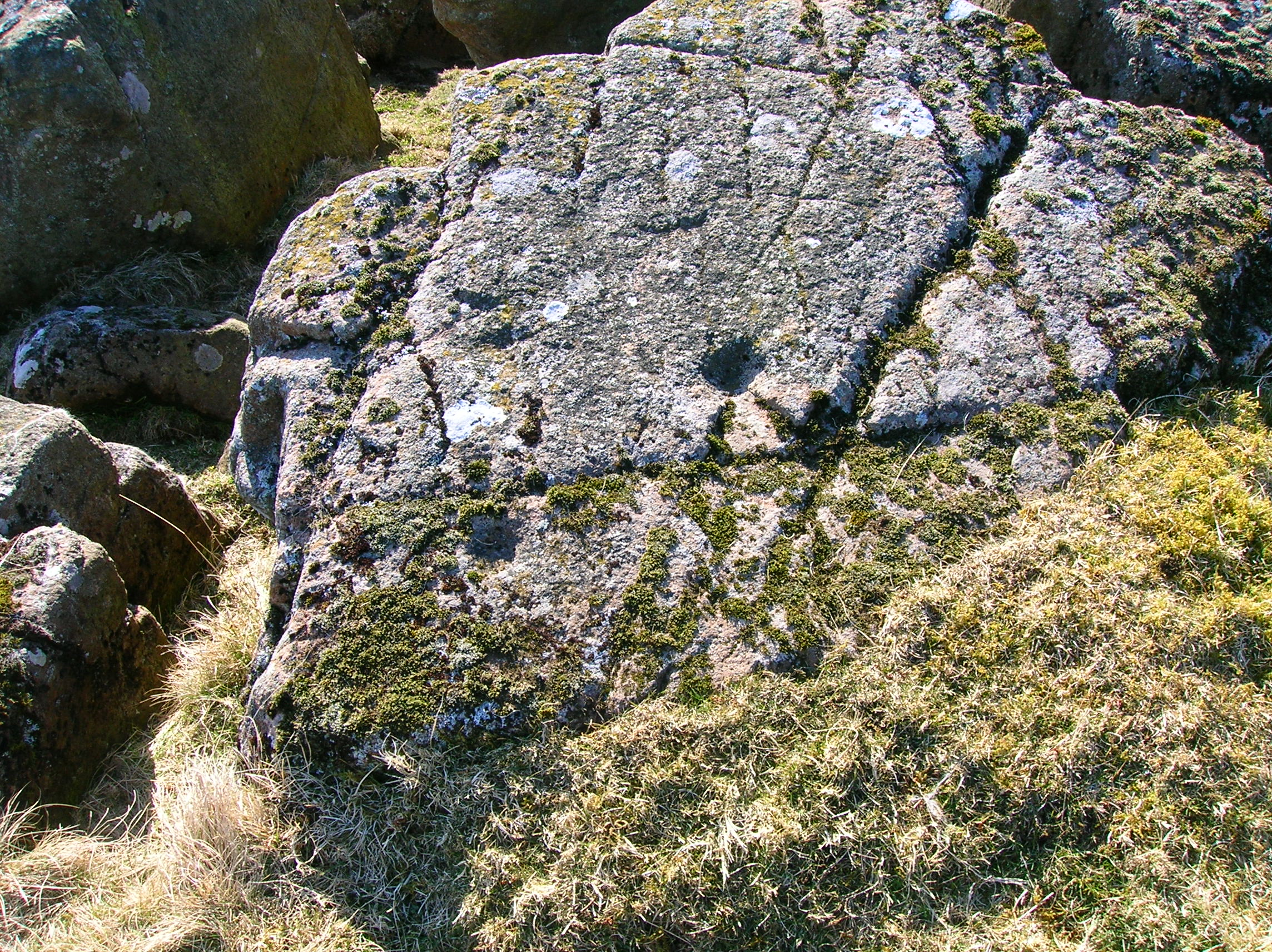
Cup marks at the Carlin Crags, Eaglesham.

The OS Maps locate a Carlin Stone or Carlin Crags/Craigs near Bonnyton Golf Club on the outskirts of Eaglesham. Cup marked stones are present at the site. At least two fairly horizontal flat rock faces have cups on them, rings being entirely absent. Two sets of crags are present at the site but only the upper has the petroglyphs.

=== Carlins Cairn, Dumfries and Galloway ===
This is a mountain in the south-west of Carsphairn parish.

=== Castle Douglas, Dumfries and Galloway ===
This town was known as Carlinwark until 1792. The title came from nearby Carlinwark loch in the north of the parish of Kelton.

=== Wigtown, Dumfries and Galloway ===
A Carlin Stone is to ben found at 'The Derry', near to the head of Elrig Loch near Wigtown. It is thought to have been part of a Stone circle and is situated at the OS Map Reference NX326497.

=== Scottish Borders ===
The Carlin's Tooth is the name of a natural rock outcrop in the borders between Knocks Knowe and Carter Fell.

== Miscellany ==
Near Kirkhill outside Stewarton are several farms having the name 'Kilbride' in their title. Bride - an anglicization of Brìghde, Brìd or Saint Brigid - was originally the Celtic Goddess linked with the festival of Imbolc, the eve of the first of February. She was the goddess of Spring and was associated with healing and sacred wells, therefore the antithesis of the Carlin or Cailleach.

Papers in the Scottish National Archive state that the lands of Kilbride Cunninghame near Stewarton were also called the 'Lands of Carlin.'
