= Labbacallee wedge tomb =

Megalithic monument in County Cork, Ireland

Labbacallee Wedge Tomb
- Leaba Chaillí (Irish)
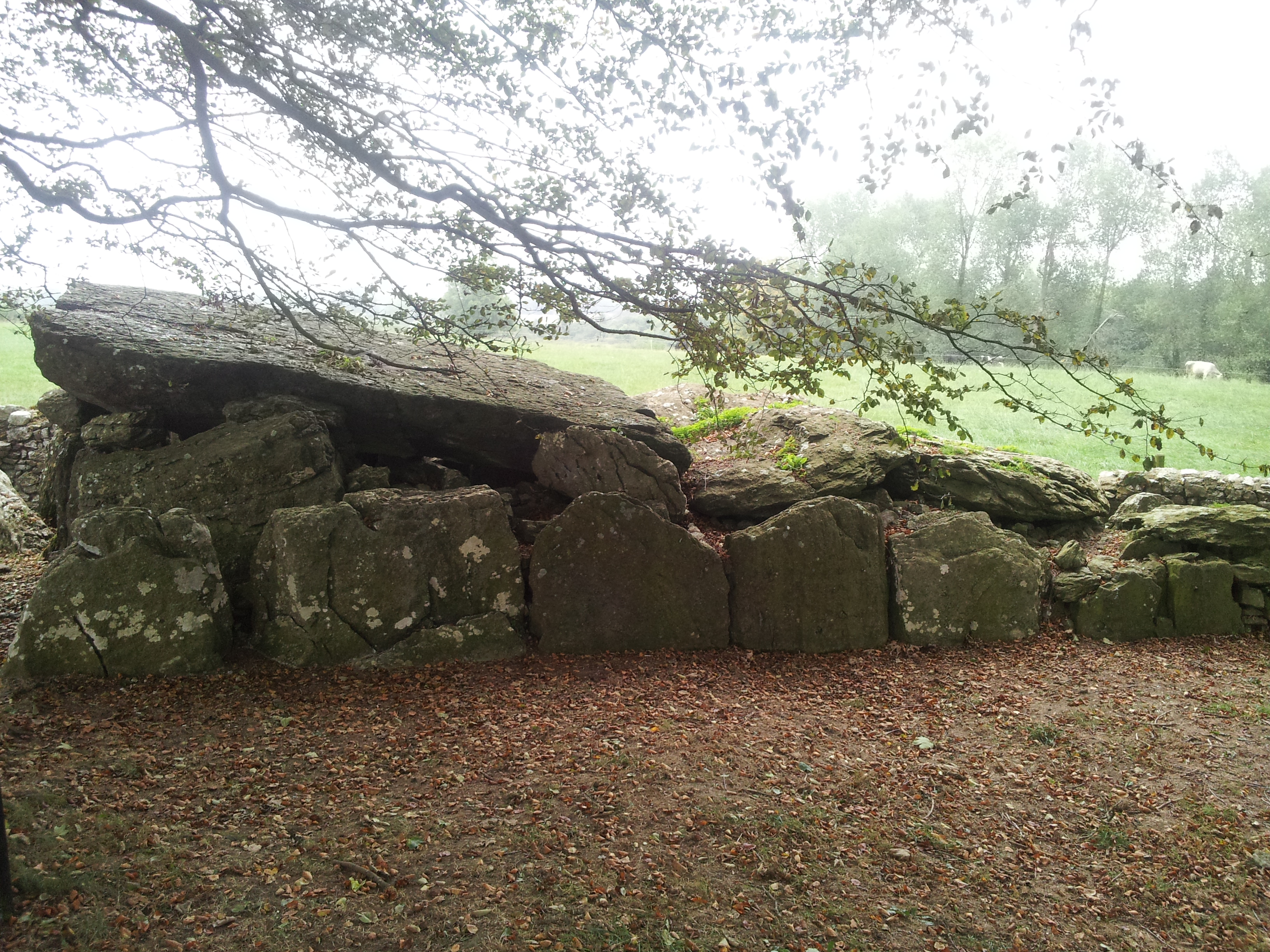
- The tomb in 2013
- Interactive map of Labbacallee Wedge Tomb
- 52.1742°N 8.3345°W
- Type: Wedge tomb
- Periods: Bronze Age
- Location: County Cork, Ireland

History
- Built: c. 2300 BC

Site notes
- Public access: Yes

National monument of Ireland
- Reference no.: 318

Labbacallee Wedge Tomb (Irish: Leaba Chaillí, meaning 'hag's bed') is a large pre-historic burial monument, located 8 km (5.0 mi) north-west of Fermoy and 2 km (1.2 mi) south-east of Glanworth, County Cork, Ireland. It is the largest Irish wedge tomb and dates from roughly 2300 BC. The tomb is a National Monument in State Care no. 318. It was the first megalithic tomb in the country to be described by an antiquarian writer, in John Aubrey’s manuscript of 1693.

== Features ==
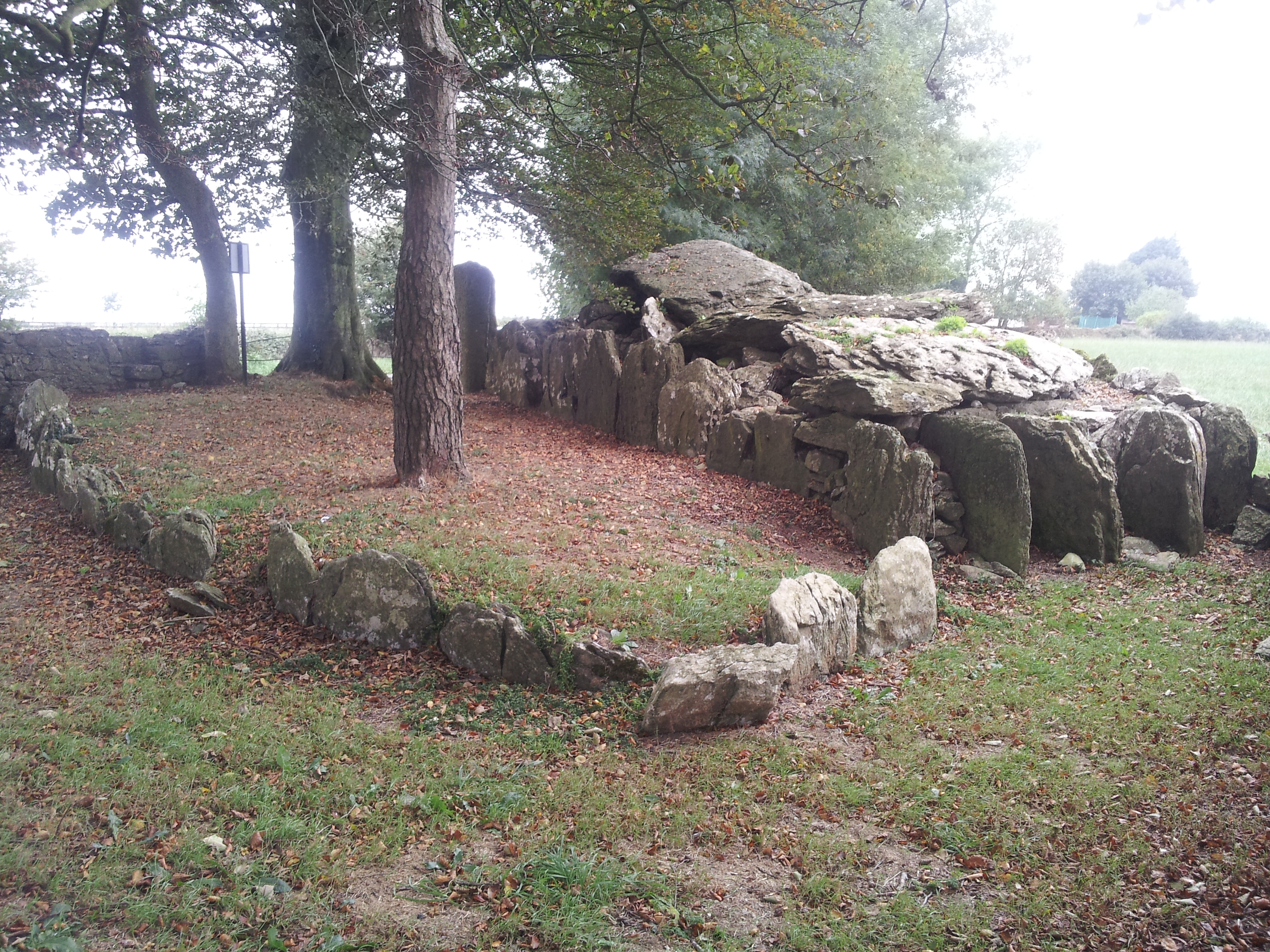
Labbacallee Wedge Tomb

Labbacallee is the largest wedge tomb in Ireland. The tomb has three massive capstones, with the largest weighing 10 tonnes, and three large buttress stones at the back. The burial area consists of a long chamber, divided by a large vertical slab into two areas of unequal length. The eastern or inner end, when covered by the capstone, formed a sealed and self contained burial unit. The main chamber area, to the west, with two large capstones, was also sealed by a large ‘entrance’ stone. Access to both chambers was only possible by the removal of the end capstone. The gallery measures about 7.75 meters long from inside the stone closing its western end to the inner face of the back stone of the Eastern chamber. The tomb appears to have been closed up and abandoned shortly after the burials were deposited in it. At a later period, the chamber was entered through the side wall, close to the entrance stone at the west end. A large corbel was displaced and side stones were moved to allow access. The main chamber was used as a shelter, resulting in the disturbance of the previous interments. The main evidence for this activity consists of animal bones, charcoal and sherds of cooking pot.

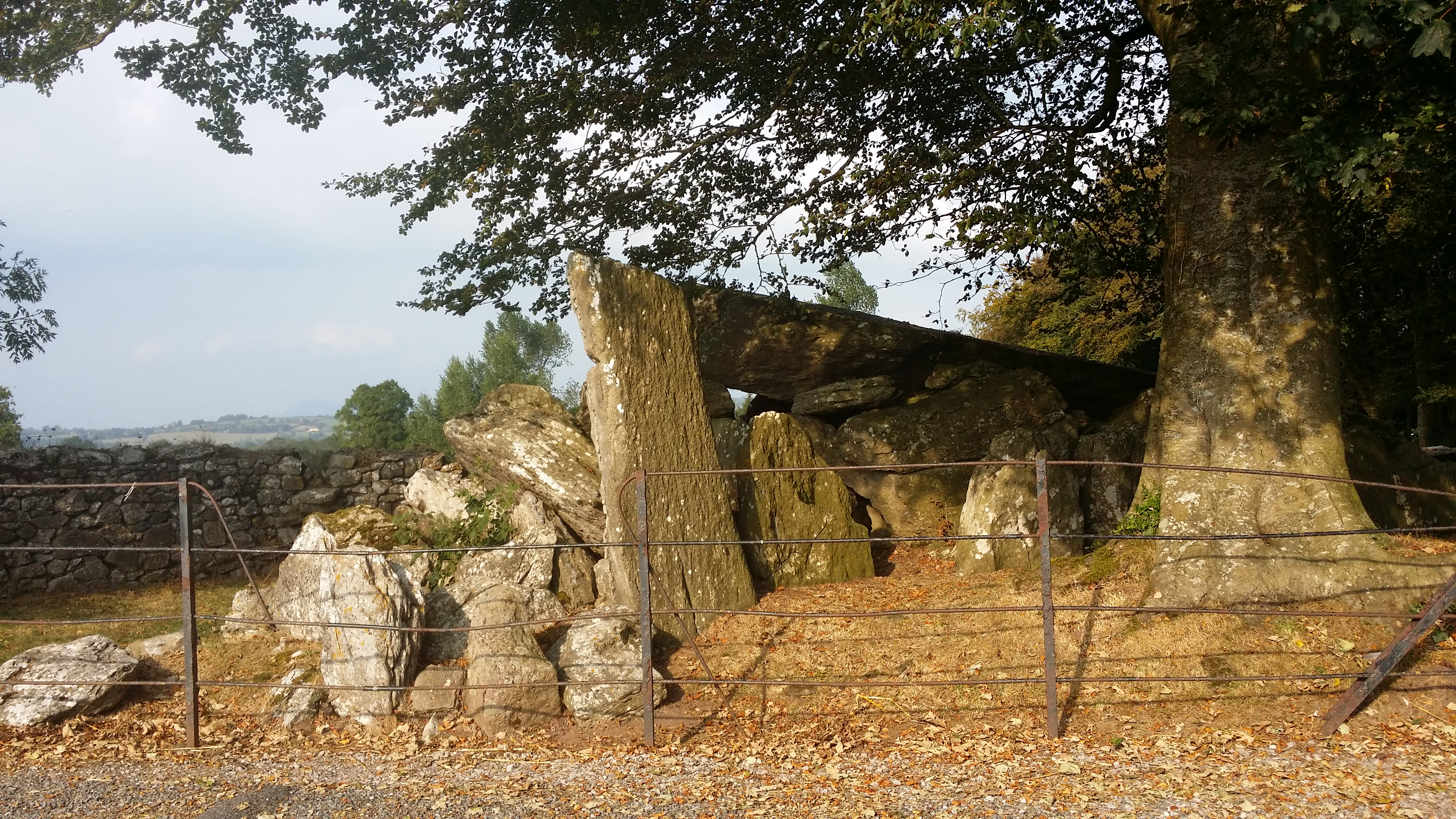
Labbacallee Wedge Tomb

== Excavations ==
Labbacallee Wedge Tomb was one of the first sites excavated under the new National Monuments Act (1930) by Harold Leask and Liam Price in 1934. The excavations revealed a number of burials, fragments of a late Stone Age decorated pot, and fragments of bone and stone. The west chamber contained parts of an adult male and a child, along with the skull believed to belong to the female skeleton in the east chamber and several sherds of a single late Stone Age decorated pot. According to the excavation report, at this time the smallest chamber was filled to the top with rubble, including earth, stones, ash and the bones of animals and humans. When these were cleared a skeleton of a woman was exposed, together with a bone pin which might have fastened a garment or shroud. The woman's skull was missing but later found upright in the large main chamber. One of the leg bones of the skeleton was deformed.

== Folklore ==
The folklore behind the wedge tomb, as the translation "Hag's Bed" suggests, is that a hag lived at the site. She has been associated with the 'Cailleach', a hag goddess from Celtic tradition.
There are a number of different stories about the wedge tomb. In one version of the story, Mogh Ruith, the hag's husband, fell in love with her sister. In a fit of jealously the hag chased the druid towards the River Funshion. He had reached the water and started to cross it, but the hag threw an enormous boulder which struck the druid, toppling him and pinning him down under the water. It is not specified in the tale how the hag died but she is believed to be buried in the tomb which was once her dwelling.

There is also a later tale of a supernatural encounter at Labbacallee. According to the tale, four local men went to the tomb in the middle of the night, with the aim of digging for the treasure that they had heard was buried there. As they started to dig, it is said that the hag's daughter Aibell appeared in the form of a cat, fire bursting from her tail, terrifying the men, who were dazzled by the light emitting from it. Panicking, they ran screaming from the scene, and one of the men fell into the nearby river and drowned. The remaining men lived to tell the tale, and their experience stood as a stark warning to others that they should never, under any circumstances, disturb the resting place of the long dead at this most mysterious of megalithic sites.

== Sources ==
- "Labbacallee". The Megalithic Portal.
- Noonan, Damien (2001). "Castles & Ancient Monuments of Ireland", Arum Press. ISBN 1854107526
- Weir, A (1980). Early Ireland. A Field Guide. Belfast: Blackstaff Press
- DeValera, Ruaidhrí; Ó Nualláin, Sean (1982). Survey of the Megalithic Tombs of Ireland. Volume IV. Counties Cork, Kerry, Limerick, Tipperary. Dublin: The Stationery Office
- Brindley, A. L.; Lanting, J. N.; Mook, W. G. (1987). "Radiocarbon Dates from Moneen and Labbacallee, County Cork". The Journal of Irish Archaeology. 4: 13–20. ISSN 0268-537X
- Power, Denis (1989). "County Focus: Cork". Archaeology Ireland. 3 (2): 46–50
