= Cuirithir mac Doborchu =

Irish 7th century poet

Cuirithir of Connacht was an Irish poet, fl. 7th century.

According to the story Comracc Liadain i Cuirithir, which dates to the 9th century, Cuirithir mac Doborchu of Connacht was a poet, who met the woman poet Liadain of Corkaguiney while she was "on a tour into the territory of the inhabitants of Connacht."

Cuirithir proposed to her at an ale-feast, asking "Why do we not make a union, o Liadain? Brilliant would be our son whom you would beget." Liadain replied "Let us not do so, so that my tour is not spoiled for me. If you might come for me again, to my house, I shall come with you." They slept together that night, and parted the following day.

However, before she and Cuirithir met again, Liadain became a nun. It is uncertain if this is "a conflict between love and religion [or if] Liadain postpones the marriage to Cuirithir because of her professional interests as a travelling poetess."

The couple seek the spiritual aid of St. Cummine (Cumméne Fota). However Cuirithir breaks the vow of chastity and is banished to another monastery by Cummine, being also forced to renounce his love of Liadain. He later crosses the sea while Liadain endures penance and prayer before dying of a broken heart.

== Extract ==
From a translation by Liz Gabay:

Now this is the torment that she had given to him, namely her swiftness by which she had put on the veil. When he heard of her arrival from the west, he went in a coracle over the sea, and he became a pilgrim, so that she didn't see him henceforth.

- "He has gone this time," she said.
- The stone upon which he used to be praying, she was upon that stone until she died, until her soul went to heaven. It is that stone that went across her face.
- This above is the Encounter of Líadain and Cuirithir.
