= List of townlands of the barony of Bear =

This is a sortable table of the townlands in the barony of Bear, County Cork, Ireland. Duplicate names occur where there is more than one townland with the same name in the barony, and also where a townland is known by two alternative names. Names marked in bold typeface are towns and villages, and the word Town appears for those entries in the area column.

== Townland list ==
Townland	Area (acres)	Barony	Civil parish	Poor law union
Adrigole	293	Bear	Kilcaskan	Castletown
Aghabeg	267	Bear	Killaconenagh	Castletown
**Allihies**	Town	Bear	Kilnamanagh	Castletown
Allihies	834	Bear	Kilnamanagh	Castletown
Ardacluggin	232	Bear	Kilcatherine	Castletown
Ardagannive	86	Bear	Killaconenagh	Castletown
Ardagh	538	Bear	Killaconenagh	Castletown
Ardaragh East	197	Bear	Killaconenagh	Castletown
Ardaragh West	84	Bear	Killaconenagh	Castletown
Ardgroom Inward	1,456	Bear	Kilcatherine	Castletown
Ardgroom Outward	2,243	Bear	Kilcatherine	Castletown
Aughabrack	169	Bear	Kilcatherine	Castletown
Ballaghboy	229	Bear	Kilnamanagh	Castletown
Ballard	193	Bear	Killaconenagh	Castletown
Ballard Commons	668	Bear	Killaconenagh	Castletown
Ballycrovane	550	Bear	Kilcatherine	Castletown
Ballycrovane Island	4	Bear	Kilcatherine	Castletown
Ballycrovane Little	1	Bear	Kilcatherine	Castletown
**Ballydonegan**	Town	Bear	Kilnamanagh	Castletown
Ballydonegan	535	Bear	Kilnamanagh	Castletown
**Ballynacallagh**	Town	Bear	Kilnamanagh	Castletown
Ballynacallagh	412	Bear	Kilnamanagh	Castletown
**Ballynacarriga**	Town	Bear	Kilnamanagh	Castletown
Ballynacarriga	464	Bear	Kilnamanagh	Castletown
Ballynahown	135	Bear	Kilcaskan	Castletown
Ballynakilla	1,010	Bear	Killaconenagh	Castletown
Ballynakilla	32	Bear	Kilcaskan	Castletown
Bank	95	Bear	Killaconenagh	Castletown
Barrees	1,098	Bear	Kilcatherine	Castletown
Bawn	205	Bear	Kilcaskan	Castletown
Bawnard	156	Bear	Kilcatherine	Castletown
Billeragh	211	Bear	Kilnamanagh	Castletown
Bocarnagh	335	Bear	Kilcaskan	Bantry
Bofickil	420	Bear	Kilcatherine	Castletown
Boher	36	Bear	Killaconenagh	Castletown
Bohernoe	27	Bear	Killaconenagh	Castletown
Brackcloon	198	Bear	Kilnamanagh	Castletown
Bunskellig	512	Bear	Kilcatherine	Castletown
Caheravart	52	Bear	Kilcatherine	Castletown
Cahergarriff	341	Bear	Killaconenagh	Castletown
**Caherkeen**	Town	Bear	Kilcatherine	Castletown
Caherkeen	1,044	Bear	Kilcatherine	Castletown
Cahermeeleboe	530	Bear	Kilnamanagh	Castletown
Cametringane	41	Bear	Killaconenagh	Castletown
Caminches	249	Bear	Kilnamanagh	Castletown
Canalmore	265	Bear	Kilnamanagh	Castletown
Canalough	441	Bear	Kilnamanagh	Castletown
Canrooska	590	Bear	Kilcaskan	Bantry
Canshanavoe	1,365	Bear	Kilcaskan	Castletown
Cappaghavuckee	89	Bear	Killaconenagh	Castletown
Cappaleigh North	123	Bear	Kilcaskan	Castletown
Cappaleigh South	115	Bear	Kilcaskan	Castletown
Cappanaparka East	171	Bear	Kilcaskan	Castletown
Cappanaparka West	273	Bear	Kilcaskan	Castletown
Cappyaughna	136	Bear	Kilcaskan	Bantry
Carrig	42	Bear	Killaconenagh	Castletown
Carrig	47	Bear	Kilcatherine	Castletown
Carrigboy	1	Bear	Kilcaskan	Castletown
Carrigrour	241	Bear	Kilcaskan	Bantry
**Castletown Bearhaven**	Town	Bear	Killaconenagh	Castletown
Clashduff	1,066	Bear	Kilcaskan	Castletown
Cloan	449	Bear	Kilnamanagh	Castletown
**Cloanmines**	Town	Bear	Kilnamanagh	Castletown
Clogfune	732	Bear	Kilnamanagh	Castletown
Cloghane Lower	84	Bear	Kilnamanagh	Castletown
Cloghane Upper	238	Bear	Kilnamanagh	Castletown
Clogher	961	Bear	Kilcatherine	Castletown
Clonglaskan	600	Bear	Killaconenagh	Castletown
Cloonaghlin	78	Bear	Killaconenagh	Castletown
Cloonaghlin Upper	101	Bear	Killaconenagh	Castletown
Cloonaghlin West	175	Bear	Killaconenagh	Castletown
Cloontree	543	Bear	Kilcatherine	Castletown
Clydagh	86	Bear	Kilcaskan	Castletown
Commons East	881	Bear	Kilcatherine	Castletown
Commons West	581	Bear	Kilcatherine	Castletown
Coolieragh	533	Bear	Kilcaskan	Bantry
Coom	684	Bear	Kilnamanagh	Castletown
Coomarkane	2,034	Bear	Kilcaskan	Bantry
Coomgira	953	Bear	Kilcaskan	Castletown
Coonane	715	Bear	Kilcaskan	Bantry
Coorannel	543	Bear	Kilcaskan	Bantry
**Coulagh**	Town	Bear	Kilcatherine	Castletown
Coulagh	362	Bear	Kilcatherine	Castletown
Crooha East	293	Bear	Kilcaskan	Castletown
Crooha Middle	183	Bear	Kilcaskan	Castletown
Crooha West	205	Bear	Kilcaskan	Castletown
Crossterry East	347	Bear	Kilcaskan	Bantry
Crossterry West	1,050	Bear	Kilcaskan	Bantry
Crow Island	6	Bear	Kilnamanagh	Castletown
Crumpane	1,088	Bear	Kilcatherine	Castletown
Curradonohoe	181	Bear	Killaconenagh	Castletown
Curraduff	122	Bear	Killaconenagh	Castletown
Curraduff	218	Bear	Kilcaskan	Castletown
Curragh	27	Bear	Killaconenagh	Castletown
Curragh East	369	Bear	Kilcaskan	Castletown
Curragh West	22	Bear	Kilcaskan	Castletown
Currakeal	124	Bear	Kilcaskan	Bantry
Currakillane	381	Bear	Kilcaskan	Bantry
Curryglass	145	Bear	Killaconenagh	Castletown
Derreen Lower	560	Bear	Kilcaskan	Castletown
Derreen Upper	588	Bear	Kilcaskan	Castletown
Derreenacarrin	940	Bear	Kilcaskan	Castletown
Derreenagarig	144	Bear	Kilcaskan	Bantry
Derreenataggart Commons	318	Bear	Killaconenagh	Castletown
Derreenataggart East	175	Bear	Killaconenagh	Castletown
Derreenataggart Middle	103	Bear	Killaconenagh	Castletown
Derreenataggart West	146	Bear	Killaconenagh	Castletown
Derreenavroonig	150	Bear	Kilcaskan	Bantry
Derreenboy Lower	374	Bear	Kilcaskan	Bantry
Derreenboy Upper	432	Bear	Kilcaskan	Bantry
Derreennagough	368	Bear	Kilcaskan	Bantry
Derreeny	406	Bear	Kilcaskan	Castletown
Derryconnery	528	Bear	Kilcaskan	Bantry
Derrycreeveen	1,085	Bear	Killaconenagh	Castletown
Derrylough	295	Bear	Kilcaskan	Castletown
Derrymihin East	521	Bear	Killaconenagh	Castletown
Derrymihin West	606	Bear	Killaconenagh	Castletown
Derrynafulla	768	Bear	Kilcaskan	Bantry
Dinish Island	45	Bear	Killaconenagh	Castletown
Disert	352	Bear	Killaconenagh	Castletown
Doorus	184	Bear	Kilcaskan	Bantry
Drom North	170	Bear	Killaconenagh	Castletown
Drom South	117	Bear	Killaconenagh	Castletown
Drom West	118	Bear	Killaconenagh	Castletown
Dromagowlane	240	Bear	Kilcaskan	Castletown
Dromateebara	171	Bear	Kilcaskan	Castletown
Dromderaown	86	Bear	Kilcaskan	Bantry
Dromdour	133	Bear	Kilcaskan	Bantry
Dromgare	44	Bear	Killaconenagh	Castletown
Dromgarvan	230	Bear	Kilcaskan	Castletown
Drumaclarig	117	Bear	Kilcaskan	Bantry
Drumlave	364	Bear	Kilcaskan	Castletown
Dunboy	203	Bear	Killaconenagh	Castletown
Eskenacartan	17	Bear	Killaconenagh	Castletown
Esknamucky	153	Bear	Kilcaskan	Bantry
Eyeries	604	Bear	Kilcatherine	Castletown
Eyeries Island	2	Bear	Kilcatherine	Castletown
Faha East	126	Bear	Kilcaskan	Castletown
Faha West	250	Bear	Kilcaskan	Castletown
Fanahy	976	Bear	Killaconenagh	Castletown
Faunkill and the Woods	370	Bear	Kilcatherine	Castletown
Felane East	109	Bear	Killaconenagh	Castletown
Felane Middle	195	Bear	Killaconenagh	Castletown
Felane West	202	Bear	Killaconenagh	Castletown
**Firkeel**	Town	Bear	Kilnamanagh	Castletown
Foildarrig	472	Bear	Killaconenagh	Castletown
Fuhur	460	Bear	Killaconenagh	Castletown
Furkeal	444	Bear	Kilcaskan	Bantry
Garinish	110	Bear	Kilnamanagh	Castletown
Garinish	36	Bear	Kilcaskan	Bantry
Garinish Island	4	Bear	Kilnamanagh	Castletown
Garinish West	5	Bear	Kilcaskan	Castletown
Garranes	606	Bear	Kilnamanagh	Castletown
Glanarough	215	Bear	Kilnamanagh	Castletown
Glenbeg	1,203	Bear	Kilcatherine	Castletown
Glengarrif	74	Bear	Kilcaskan	Bantry
Glenlough	1,726	Bear	Kilcaskan	Castletown
Gortagenerick	65	Bear	Killaconenagh	Castletown
Gortagoulane	20	Bear	Killaconenagh	Castletown
Gortagraffer	61	Bear	Killaconenagh	Castletown
Gortatornora	17	Bear	Kilcatherine	Castletown
Gortgarriff	255	Bear	Kilcatherine	Castletown
Gortroe Lower	96	Bear	Kilcaskan	Bantry
Gortroe Upper	77	Bear	Kilcaskan	Bantry
Gortsallagh	24	Bear	Killaconenagh	Castletown
Gour	739	Bear	Killaconenagh	Castletown
Gowlane	1,171	Bear	Kilcatherine	Castletown
Greenane	809	Bear	Killaconenagh	Castletown
Illanebeg	7	Bear	Kilnamanagh	Castletown
Illaunard	1	Bear	Kilnamanagh	Castletown
Illaunbweeheen	2	Bear	Kilcatherine	Castletown
Illauncohid	1	Bear	Kilnamanagh	Castletown
Illauncreagh	1	Bear	Kilcaskan	Castletown
Illaunnamcaula	2	Bear	Kilcatherine	Castletown
Inches	850	Bear	Kilcatherine	Castletown
Inchintaggart	145	Bear	Kilcaskan	Bantry
Inchintaglin	1,140	Bear	Kilcaskan	Castletown
Inchinteskin	86	Bear	Kilcatherine	Castletown
Inishfarnard	64	Bear	Kilcatherine	Castletown
Iskanamucky	9	Bear	Killaconenagh	Castletown
Kealagowlane	787	Bear	Kilcaskan	Castletown
Kealoge	327	Bear	Kilnamanagh	Castletown
Keamnalicky	7	Bear	Killaconenagh	Castletown
Keeltrasna	156	Bear	Kilcaskan	Castletown
Kilcaskan	942	Bear	Kilcaskan	Castletown
Kilcatherine	2,097	Bear	Kilcatherine	Castletown
Kildromalive	425	Bear	Kilcaskan	Castletown
**Kilkinnikin**	Town	Bear	Kilnamanagh	Castletown
Kilkinnikin East	331	Bear	Kilnamanagh	Castletown
Kilkinnikin West	401	Bear	Kilnamanagh	Castletown
Killenough	83	Bear	Kilcaskan	Castletown
**Killough**	Town	Bear	Kilnamanagh	Castletown
Killough East	387	Bear	Kilnamanagh	Castletown
Killough West	364	Bear	Kilnamanagh	Castletown
Kilmackowen	1,154	Bear	Kilcatherine	Castletown
**Kilmichael**	Town	Bear	Kilnamanagh	Castletown
Kilmichael	480	Bear	Kilnamanagh	Castletown
Knockacullin	80	Bear	Killaconenagh	Castletown
Knockane	103	Bear	Killaconenagh	Castletown
Knockane More	26	Bear	Killaconenagh	Castletown
Knockaneroe	134	Bear	Killaconenagh	Castletown
Knockoura	821	Bear	Killaconenagh	Castletown
Knockroe East	357	Bear	Kilnamanagh	Castletown
Knockroe Middle	339	Bear	Kilnamanagh	Castletown
Knockroe West	242	Bear	Kilnamanagh	Castletown
Lackavane	620	Bear	Kilcaskan	Castletown
Leahill	376	Bear	Kilcaskan	Castletown
Leitrim Beg	173	Bear	Kilcaskan	Castletown
Leitrim More	93	Bear	Kilcaskan	Castletown
Lickbarrahane	241	Bear	Kilnamanagh	Castletown
Lickeen East	222	Bear	Kilcaskan	Bantry
Lickeen West	149	Bear	Kilcaskan	Bantry
Little Island	1	Bear	Kilnamanagh	Castletown
Long Island	6	Bear	Kilnamanagh	Castletown
Loughane Beg	276	Bear	Kilnamanagh	Castletown
Loughane More	387	Bear	Kilnamanagh	Castletown
Loughavaul	518	Bear	Kilcaskan	Bantry
Loughure Island	2	Bear	Kilcaskan	Castletown
Lyre	201	Bear	Kilcaskan	Bantry
Lyre	82	Bear	Killaconenagh	Castletown
Meenaduff	32	Bear	Killaconenagh	Castletown
Minane Island	2	Bear	Killaconenagh	Castletown
Minanekeal	1	Bear	Killaconenagh	Castletown
Monteensudder	130	Bear	Kilcaskan	Bantry
Muccurragh	309	Bear	Kilcaskan	Bantry
Orthon's Island	1	Bear	Kilcaskan	Castletown
Park	198	Bear	Killaconenagh	Castletown
Reen	40	Bear	Kilcaskan	Castletown
Reenabulliga	334	Bear	Kilcaskan	Castletown
Reenmeen East	133	Bear	Kilcaskan	Bantry
Reenmeen West	104	Bear	Kilcaskan	Bantry
Reentrusk	1,424	Bear	Kilnamanagh	Castletown
Rerrin	291	Bear	Killaconenagh	Castletown
Roancarrig-beg (rock)	--	Bear	Kilcaskan	Bantry
Roancarrig-more (rock)	--	Bear	Kilcaskan	Bantry
Rodeen	564	Bear	Killaconenagh	Castletown
Roosk	437	Bear	Kilcaskan	Castletown
Rossmackowen Commons	2,453	Bear	Killaconenagh	Castletown
Rossnagrena	429	Bear	Kilcaskan	Bantry
Rossnashunsoge	100	Bear	Kilcaskan	Bantry
Rougham	1,068	Bear	Kilcaskan	Bantry
Scart	19	Bear	Killaconenagh	Castletown
Scrivoge	210	Bear	Kilnamanagh	Castletown
Scrough Island	1	Bear	Kilnamanagh	Castletown
Shanacoumha	28	Bear	Killaconenagh	Castletown
Shanavallyleigh	85	Bear	Killaconenagh	Castletown
Sheelane Island	1	Bear	Kilcaskan	Castletown
Shrone	394	Bear	Kilcaskan	Bantry
Skehil	323	Bear	Kilcaskan	Bantry
Teernahillane	282	Bear	Killaconenagh	Castletown
The Bull Island	1	Bear	Kilnamanagh	Castletown
The Calf Island	1	Bear	Kilnamanagh	Castletown
The Cow Island	1	Bear	Kilnamanagh	Castletown
The Woods & Faunkill	370	Bear	Kilcatherine	Castletown
Thornhill	219	Bear	Killaconenagh	Castletown
Tilickafinna	510	Bear	Kilnamanagh	Castletown
Tooreen	556	Bear	Kilcaskan	Bantry
Tooreen	9	Bear	Killaconenagh	Castletown
Tooreen Beg	155	Bear	Killaconenagh	Castletown
Tooreen More East	188	Bear	Killaconenagh	Castletown
Tooreen More West	167	Bear	Killaconenagh	Castletown
Tooreennagrena	504	Bear	Kilcaskan	Castletown
Tracashel	166	Bear	Kilcaskan	Kinsale
Trafrask East	194	Bear	Kilcaskan	Castletown
Trafrask West	122	Bear	Kilcaskan	Castletown
Ulusker	83	Bear	Kilcaskan	Castletown
Urhin	1,480	Bear	Kilcatherine	Castletown
Youngfield	308	Bear	Kilcaskan	Bantry
