= Líadan (poet) =

Irish 7th century poet

Liadain
- Writing career
- Language: Old Irish

Liadain was an Irish poet of the 7th century.

According to the story Comracc Líadaine ocus Cuirithir, which dates to the 9th or early 10th century, Liadain of Corkaguiney was an Irish woman poet on a tour into the territory of the inhabitants of Connacht when she met Cuirithir mac Doborchu, a poet native to the area.

Cuirithir proposed to her at an ale-feast, asking "Why do we not make a union, o Liadain? Brilliant would be our son whom you would beget." Liadain replied "Let us not do so, so that my tour is not spoiled for me. If you might come for me again, to my house, I shall come with you." They slept together that night, and parted the following day.

However, before she and Cuirithir met again, Liadain became a nun. It is uncertain if this is "a conflict between love and religion [or if] Liadain postpones the marriage to Cuirithir because of her professional interests as a travelling poetess."

The couple seek the spiritual aid of St. Cummine (Cumméne Fota. However, Cuirithir breaks the vow of chastity and is banished to another monastery by Cummine, being also forced to renounce his love of Liadain. He later crosses the sea while Liadain endures penance and prayer before dying of a broken heart.

== Verse ==
Ruth Lehmann's translation of part of the tale, as told by Liadain:

No pleasure
in deed done to loving-one;
tormenting without measure.
What madness
not to give him happiness,
though fear of God feed sadness.
No ruin,
his affair desirable
through pain heaven pursuing.
Cause slender
through me troubled Cuirithir,
though I was gentle, tender.
I'm Liadan;
it is I loved Cuirithir;
truly, though said by heathen.
Brief hour
together with Cuirithir;
our closeness then a dower.
Woods singing
to me beside Cuirithir
with somber sea-sounds dinning.

I wonder
it would trouble Cuirithir,
any deal made asunder.
No hiding:
he was my heart's true lover,
though I loved all beside him.
Flames flowing
burst my heart, now desperate, dead without him - this knowing. No.
