= Lists of townlands of County Cork =

A list of lists of townlands in County Cork, Ireland by barony: there are approximately 5,580 townlands.

== Townland lists ==
- List of townlands of the barony of Bantry in County Cork
- List of townlands of the barony of Barretts in County Cork
- List of townlands of the barony of Barrymore in County Cork
- List of townlands of the barony of Bear in County Cork
- List of townlands of the barony of Condons & Clangibbon in County Cork
- List of townlands of the barony of Cork in County Cork
- List of townlands of the barony of Courceys in County Cork
- List of townlands of the barony of Duhallow in County Cork
- List of townlands of the barony of East Carbery (E.D.) in County Cork
- List of townlands of the barony of East Carbery (W.D.) in County Cork
- List of townlands of the barony of East Muskerry in County Cork
- List of townlands of the barony of Fermoy in County Cork
- List of townlands of the barony of Ibane and Barryroe in County Cork
- List of townlands of the barony of Imokilly in County Cork
- List of townlands of the barony of Kerrycurrihy in County Cork
- List of townlands of the barony of Kinalea in County Cork
- List of townlands of the barony of Kinalmeaky in County Cork
- List of townlands of the barony of Kinnatalloon in County Cork
- List of townlands of the barony of Kinsale in County Cork
- List of townlands of the barony of Orrery and Kilmore in County Cork
- List of townlands of the barony of West Carbery (E.D.) in County Cork
- List of townlands of the barony of West Carbery (W.D.) in County Cork
- List of townlands of the barony of West Muskerry in County Cork
