= Kilbarry =

Kilbarry may refer to:

Places in County Cork, Ireland

- Kilbarry, Cork City, area of Blackpool
- Kilbarry, Condons and Clangibbon, see List of townlands of the barony of Condons & Clangibbon
- Kilbarry, Duhallow, see List of townlands of the barony of Duhallow
- Kilbarry, East Carbery, see List of townlands of the barony of East Carbery (West Division)
- Kilbarry, Kinalmeaky, see List of townlands of the barony of Kinalmeaky
- Kilbarry, West Carbery, see List of townlands of the barony of West Carbery (West Division)
- Kilbarry, Inchigeelagh, see List of townlands of the barony of West Muskerry
- Kilbarry, Ballinadee, see List of townlands of the barony of West Muskerry

Places elsewhere in Ireland

- Kilbarry, Waterford, see List of civil parishes of Ireland § Waterford
- Kilbarry, townland of Tarmonbarry, County Roscommon, Ireland

Horses

- Kilbarry, winner of the 1924 Irish Grand National
- Kilbarry, ridden by double medallist Francis Weldon in equestrian events at the 1956 Summer Olympics

== See also ==
- Kilberry
