= Ballinard =

Ballinard may refer to:

- Ballinard (civil parish), a civil parish in County Limerick, Ireland
- Ballinard, Desertserges, a townland in County Cork, Ireland
- Ballinard, Tullagh, a townland in County Cork, Ireland
