= Derrymeeleen, County Cork =

Derrymeeleen Irish: Doire Mhaolín
- townland
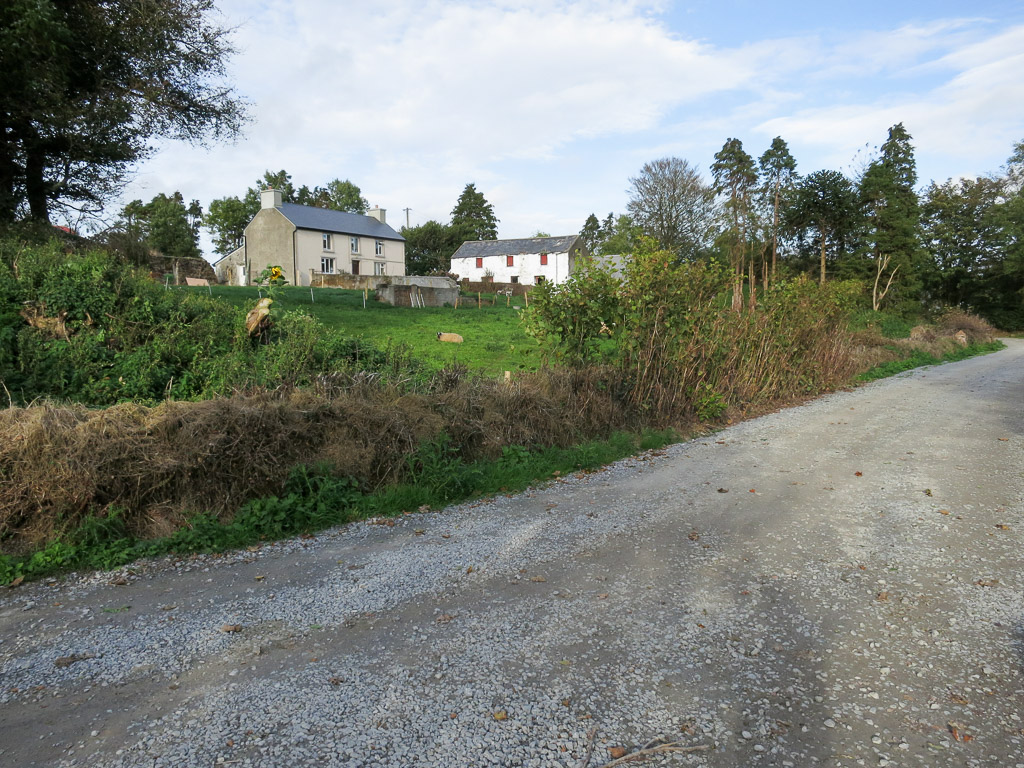
- Farmhouse and farm buildings in Derrymeeleen

- Derrymeeleen shown within Ireland
- Coordinates: 51°42′59″N 08°56′01″W
- Country: Ireland
- County: County Cork
- Barony: Carbery East (E.D.)
- Civil parish: Desertserges

Area
  - Total: 178 ha (441 acres)

Derrymeeleen (Irish: Doire Mhaolín) is a townland in the civil parish of Desertserges, County Cork, Ireland. The total population in 2011 for this townland was 70, of which males numbered 40 and females were 30. The total housing stock was 21 of which vacant households numbered 0. It is situated at a height of more than 100 metres above the River Bandon.

== See also ==
- List of townlands of the Barony of East Carbery (East_Division)
