= Ballyvoige, County Cork =

Townland in the civil parish of Desertserges, County Cork, Ireland

Ballyvoige Irish: Baile Uí Bhuaigh
- Townland
- Ballyvoige shown within Ireland
- Coordinates: 51°42′31″N 8°55′06″W
- Country: Ireland
- County: County Cork
- Barony: Carbery East (E.D.)
- Civil parish: Desertserges

Area
  - Total: 113 ha (279 acres)

Ballyvoige (Irish: Baile Uí Bhuaigh) is a townland in the civil parish of Desertserges, County Cork, Ireland. It has an area of approximately 279 acres (113 ha). Archaeological sites in Ballyvoige include a ringfort and souterrain.

== See also ==
- List of townlands of the Barony of East Carbery (E.D.)
