= Roger Boyle (bishop) =

Irish Anglican bishop (died 1687)

Roger Boyle (1617? – 1687) was an Irish Protestant churchman, Bishop of Down and Connor and Bishop of Clogher.

== Life ==
He was educated at Trinity College, Dublin, where he was elected a Scholar in 1638 and later became a fellow. On the outbreak of the Irish Rebellion of 1641 he became tutor to The 5th Marquess of Winchester, in whose family he remained until the Restoration of 1660. In 1661 he became rector of Carrigaline and of Ringrone in the diocese of Cork. He was Precentor of Ross Cathedral from February to September 1663 and Treasurer of Cloyne Cathedral from then to 1667; He was advanced to the deanery of Cork, and on 12 September 1667 he was promoted to the see of Down and Connor. On 21 September 1672 he was translated to the see of Clogher. He died at Clones on 26 November 1687, in the seventieth year of his age, and was buried in the church at Clones.

== Works ==
He was the author of Inquisitio in fidem Christianorum hujus Sæculi, Dublin, 1665, and Summa Theologiæ Christianæ, Dublin, 1681. His commonplace book on various subjects, together with an abstract of Sir Kenelm Digby's Treatise of Bodies, is in manuscript in Trinity College Library, Dublin.
