= Kinalmeaky =

Kinalmeaky Cineál mBéice (Irish)
- Barony
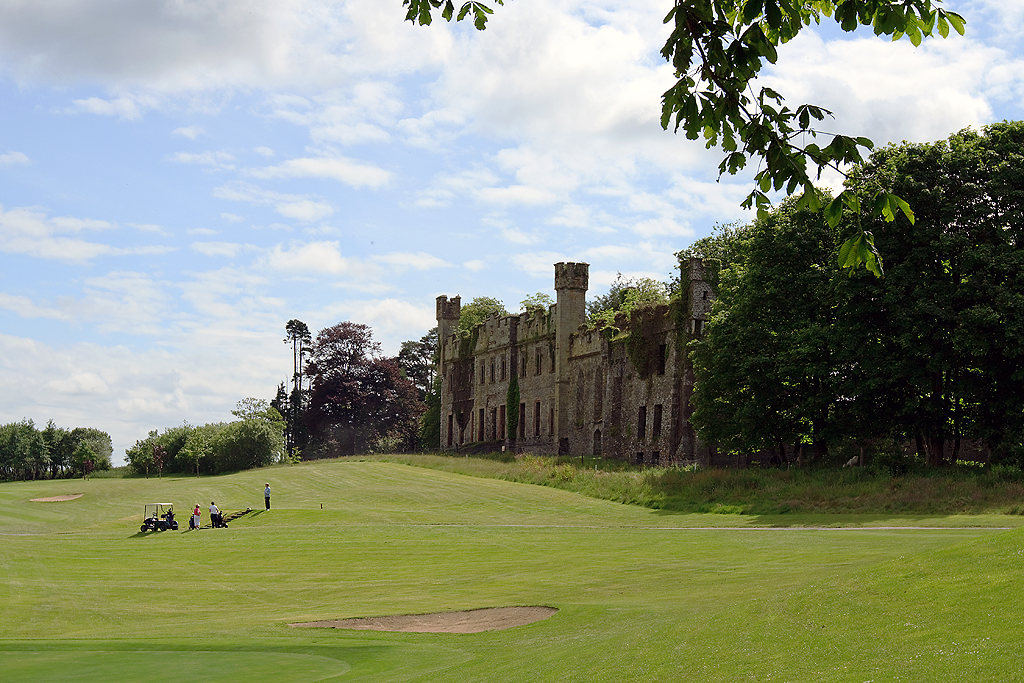
- Castle Bernard, Kilnameaky

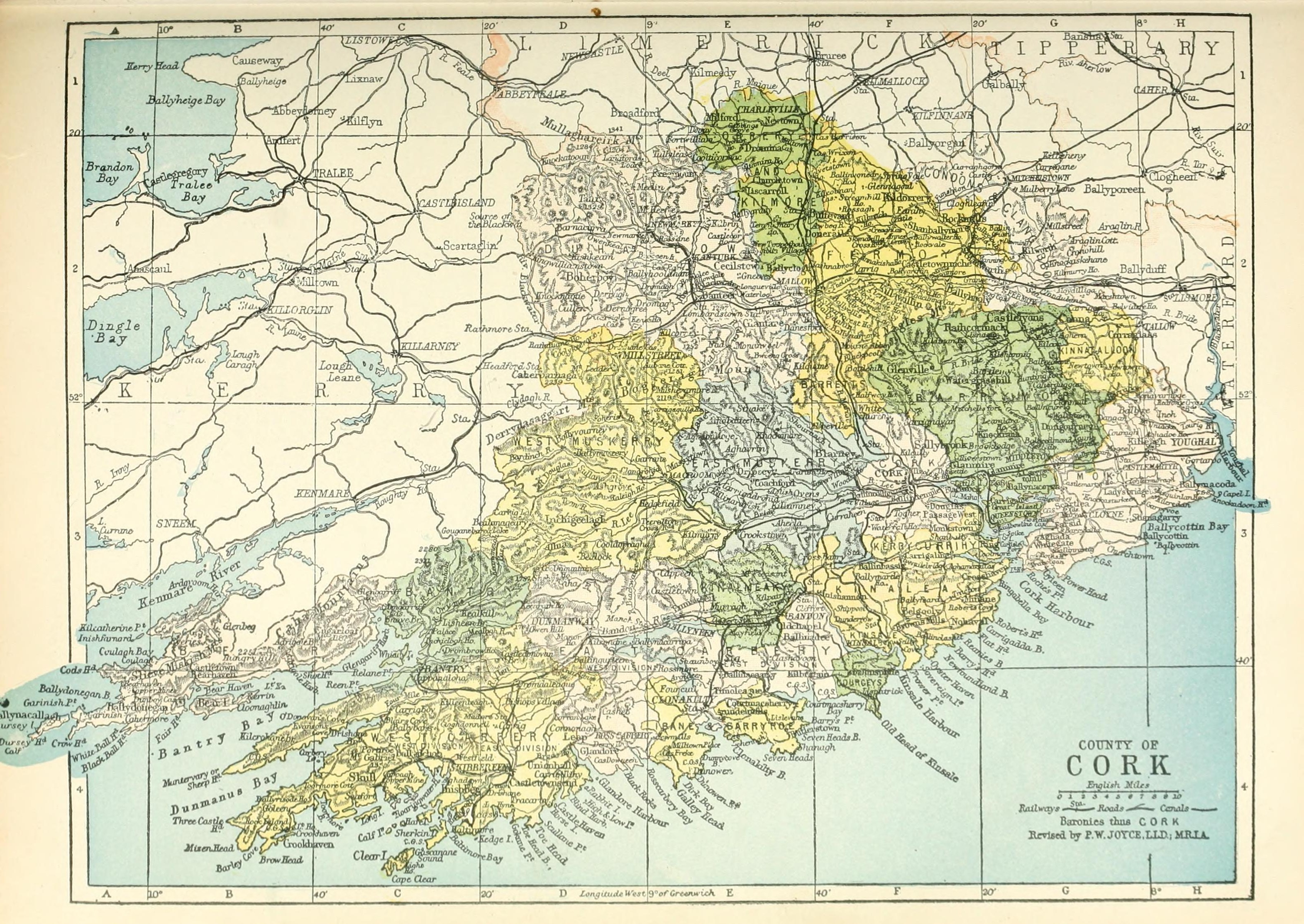
- Barony map of County Cork, 1900; Kinalmeaky barony is in the south, coloured green.

- Location within County Cork
- Coordinates: 51°46′12″N 8°47′46″W
- Sovereign state: Ireland
- Province: Munster
- County: Cork

Area
  - Total: 145.96 km^{2} (56.36 sq mi)

Kinalmeaky (Irish: Cineál mBéice) is a barony in County Cork, Ireland.

== Etymology ==
Kinalmeaky takes its name from Cenél-mBéice, Irish for "the kindred of Béce," an ancestor of the O'Mahonys.

== Geography ==
Kinalmeaky is located in south-central County Cork, on the Bandon River.

== History ==
Kinalmeaky was anciently a territory of the Ó Mathghamhna (O'Mahoney), chief of Ui Eachach Mumhan. The rebellion of Conoghor Ó Mathghamhna led to the confiscation of Kinalmeaky in 1580 after the Second Desmond Rebellion, and it was sold to Richard Grenville. In 1628 the territory was used for the title of Viscount Boyle of Kinalmeaky. In the 17th century, it was described as "wild, overgrown and encumbered with woods and bogs."

== List of settlements ==
Below is a list of settlements in Kinalmeaky:

- Bandon
- Desertserges

== See also ==
- List of townlands of the barony of Kinalmeaky
