= Achadh Eochaille =

Achadh Eochaille is the Irish-language name for:

- Ahoghill, a large village in County Antrim, Northern Ireland
- Ahiohill, a small village in County Cork, Ireland
