= Kilcolman, County Cork =

Townland in County Cork, Ireland

Coordinates: 51.723°N 8.854°W

Kilcolman (Irish: Cill Cholmáin) is a townland in the civil parish of Desertserges, County Cork, Ireland. The townland, which is 561 acres (227 ha) in area, is approximately 5km from the village of Enniskean. As of the 2011 census, Kilcolman townland had a population of 85 people.

The local primary school, Kilcolman National School, is in the nearby townland of Maulbrack East.
