= List of townlands of the barony of West Muskerry =

This is a sortable table of the townlands in the barony of Muskerry West, County Cork, Ireland. Duplicate names occur where there is more than one townland with the same name in the barony (such as Glebe), and also where a townland is known by two alternative names. Names marked in bold typeface are towns and villages, and the word Town appears for those entries in the area column. Towns shown below are Inchigeelagh, Macroom, Millstreet.

The smallest townland in West Muskerry is Glebe in Kilcorney at 13 acres. The largest is Caherbarnagh at 3,626 acres.

== Townland list ==
Townland	Area (acres)	Barony	Civil parish	Poor law union (Historical)
Adrivale	460	Muskerry West	Drishane	Millstreet
Aghacunna	406	Muskerry West	Kilnamartery	Macroom
Annahala East	266	Muskerry West	Macloneigh	Macroom
Annahala West	393	Muskerry West	Macloneigh	Macroom
Annahalabog	259	Muskerry West	Macloneigh	Macroom
Ardaneneen	614	Muskerry West	Kilmichael	Dunmanway
Ardeen	360	Muskerry West	Clondrohid	Macroom
Ardnacrushy	405	Muskerry West	Clondrohid	Macroom
Ardrah	131	Muskerry West	Kilmurry	Macroom
Augeris	793	Muskerry West	Inchigeelagh	Macroom
Ballina	72	Muskerry West	Kilmichael	Dunmanway
Ballinkeen	242	Muskerry West	Drishane	Millstreet
Ballydaly	1,089	Muskerry West	Drishane	Millstreet
Ballymacorcoran	226	Muskerry West	Clondrohid	Macroom
Ballymakeery	463	Muskerry West	Ballyvourney	Macroom
Ballymichael	530	Muskerry West	Kilmurry	Macroom
Ballynagree East	1,320	Muskerry West	Macroom	Macroom
Ballynagree West	1,345	Muskerry West	Macroom	Macroom
Ballynatona	278	Muskerry West	Drishane	Millstreet
Ballytrasna	514	Muskerry West	Kilmurry	Macroom
Ballyveerane	444	Muskerry West	Macroom	Macroom
Ballyvogue	587	Muskerry West	Kilnamartery	Macroom
Ballyvouskill	495	Muskerry West	Drishane	Millstreet
Bardinch	391	Muskerry West	Ballyvourney	Macroom
Bargarriff	344	Muskerry West	Inchigeelagh	Dunmanway
Barnadivane (Kneeves)	237	Muskerry West	Kilmichael	Dunmanway
Barnadivane	215	Muskerry West	Kilmichael	Dunmanway
Baulbrack	317	Muskerry West	Kilmichael	Dunmanway
Baunreagh	76	Muskerry West	Kilcorney	Millstreet
Bawnatanaknock	382	Muskerry West	Clondrohid	Macroom
Bawnmore	515	Muskerry West	Clondrohid	Macroom
Bealick	361	Muskerry West	Macroom	Macroom
Beenreagh	255	Muskerry West	Kilcorney	Millstreet
Brehaun	211	Muskerry West	Kilnamartery	Macroom
Brookpark	750	Muskerry West	Kilcorney	Millstreet
Cabragh	398	Muskerry West	Clondrohid	Macroom
Cackanode	221	Muskerry West	Clondrohid	Macroom
Caherbarnagh	3,626	Muskerry West	Drishane	Millstreet
Caherbirrane	717	Muskerry West	Clondrohid	Macroom
Cahercarney	88	Muskerry West	Ballyvourney	Macroom
Caherdaha	208	Muskerry West	Kilnamartery	Macroom
Caherdowney	1,173	Muskerry West	Drishane	Millstreet
Caherkeegane	397	Muskerry West	Clondrohid	Macroom
Caherkereen	386	Muskerry West	Kilnamartery	Macroom
Cahernacaha	733	Muskerry West	Inchigeelagh	Macroom
Candroma	456	Muskerry West	Clondrohid	Macroom
Cappagh East	541	Muskerry West	Ballyvourney	Macroom
Cappagh West	312	Muskerry West	Ballyvourney	Macroom
Cappanaminna	99	Muskerry West	Inchigeelagh	Macroom
Cappanclare	181	Muskerry West	Inchigeelagh	Dunmanway
Carrig	119	Muskerry West	Inchigeelagh	Macroom
Carrigacooleen	599	Muskerry West	Drishane	Millstreet
Carrigagulla	2,292	Muskerry West	Macroom	Macroom
Carriganimmy	1,227	Muskerry West	Clondrohid	Macroom
Carriganine	120	Muskerry West	Macroom	Macroom
Carrigaphooca	205	Muskerry West	Clondrohid	Macroom
Carrigbaun	342	Muskerry West	Inchigeelagh	Macroom
Carrigboy	989	Muskerry West	Kilmichael	Dunmanway
Carrigdangan	618	Muskerry West	Kilmichael	Dunmanway
Carrigdarrery	204	Muskerry West	Kilmurry	Macroom
Carrigduff	1,305	Muskerry West	Kilcorney	Millstreet
Carrigleigh	246	Muskerry West	Inchigeelagh	Macroom
Carrigleigh	97	Muskerry West	Drishane	Millstreet
Carrignacurra	446	Muskerry West	Inchigeelagh	Dunmanway
Carrignadoura	422	Muskerry West	Inchigeelagh	Macroom
Carrignamaddry	285	Muskerry West	Clondrohid	Macroom
Carrignamuck	302	Muskerry West	Inchigeelagh	Dunmanway
Carrignaneelagh	154	Muskerry West	Inchigeelagh	Macroom
Carrigonirtane	334	Muskerry West	Clondrohid	Macroom
Claragh Beg	328	Muskerry West	Drishane	Millstreet
Clashbredane	807	Muskerry West	Kilmichael	Dunmanway
Clashmaguire	474	Muskerry West	Clondrohid	Macroom
Cleanrath North	564	Muskerry West	Inchigeelagh	Macroom
Cleanrath South	878	Muskerry West	Inchigeelagh	Macroom
Clearagh	461	Muskerry West	Kilmurry	Macroom
Clodah	469	Muskerry West	Kilmurry	Macroom
Cloghboola	743	Muskerry West	Inchigeelagh	Dunmanway
Cloghboola Beg	1,213	Muskerry West	Drishane	Millstreet
Cloghboola More	524	Muskerry West	Drishane	Millstreet
Cloghmacow	499	Muskerry West	Kilmurry	Macroom
Cloheena	648	Muskerry West	Kilnamartery	Macroom
Clonclud	263	Muskerry West	Kilnamartery	Macroom
Clonfadda	242	Muskerry West	Clondrohid	Macroom
Clonmoyle	461	Muskerry West	Kilmichael	Dunmanway
Cloonshear	448	Muskerry West	Inchigeelagh	Macroom
Cloonshear Beg	182	Muskerry West	Inchigeelagh	Macroom
Cloontycarthy	541	Muskerry West	Kilnamartery	Macroom
Codrum	454	Muskerry West	Macroom	Macroom
Commons	114	Muskerry West	Kilmichael	Dunmanway
Coolacleevane	615	Muskerry West	Kilmichael	Dunmanway
Coolacoosane	242	Muskerry West	Clondrohid	Macroom
Coolacresig	159	Muskerry West	Clondrohid	Macroom
Coolanarney	398	Muskerry West	Drishane	Millstreet
Coolaniddane	625	Muskerry West	Clondrohid	Macroom
Coolavoher	165	Muskerry West	Ballyvourney	Macroom
Coolavokig	923	Muskerry West	Ballyvourney	Macroom
Coolcaum	282	Muskerry West	Kilnamartery	Macroom
Coolcour	416	Muskerry West	Macroom	Macroom
Cooldaniel	803	Muskerry West	Kilmichael	Dunmanway
Cooldorragha	943	Muskerry West	Kilmichael	Dunmanway
Coolduff	674	Muskerry West	Kilmurry	Macroom
Coole	277	Muskerry West	Drishane	Millstreet
Coolea	584	Muskerry West	Ballyvourney	Macroom
Cooleen	351	Muskerry West	Inchigeelagh	Macroom
Cooleenaree	183	Muskerry West	Drishane	Millstreet
Coolierher	238	Muskerry West	Ballyvourney	Macroom
Coolnacaheragh	308	Muskerry West	Ballyvourney	Macroom
Coolnacrannagh	121	Muskerry West	Inchigeelagh	Macroom
Coolnagillagh Lower	202	Muskerry West	Drishane	Millstreet
Coolnagillagh Upper	335	Muskerry West	Drishane	Millstreet
Coolroe East	287	Muskerry West	Inchigeelagh	Dunmanway
Coolroe West	104	Muskerry West	Inchigeelagh	Dunmanway
Cools	126	Muskerry West	Kilnamartery	Macroom
Coolyhane	288	Muskerry West	Macroom	Macroom
Coomacheo	2,157	Muskerry West	Drishane	Millstreet
Coomdorragha	109	Muskerry West	Inchigeelagh	Macroom
Coomlibane	556	Muskerry West	Inchigeelagh	Macroom
Coomlmaclohy	1,403	Muskerry West	Ballyvourney	Macroom
Coomlogane	615	Muskerry West	Drishane	Millstreet
Coomnagire	856	Muskerry West	Ballyvourney	Macroom
Coomroe	953	Muskerry West	Inchigeelagh	Macroom
Cooragreenane (alternately Cooligrenane)	572	Muskerry West	Inchigeelagh	Dunmanway
Coornahahilly	594	Muskerry West	Inchigeelagh	Dunmanway
Coorolagh	201	Muskerry West	Inchigeelagh	Dunmanway
Cornery	357	Muskerry West	Inchigeelagh	Dunmanway
Coumaclovane	882	Muskerry West	Ballyvourney	Macroom
Crinaloo North (alternately Cringaloo)	535	Muskerry West	Kilcorney	Millstreet
Crinaloo South	1,203	Muskerry West	Kilcorney	Millstreet
Crossmahan	209	Muskerry West	Kilmurry	Macroom
Curra	163	Muskerry West	Clondrohid	Macroom
Currabeha	648	Muskerry West	Kilmurry	Macroom
Curracahill	691	Muskerry West	Drishane	Millstreet
Curraclogh	905	Muskerry West	Kilmurry	Macroom
Curragh	273	Muskerry West	Kilmurry	Macroom
Curragh	996	Muskerry West	Drishane	Millstreet
Curraheen	255	Muskerry West	Inchigeelagh	Dunmanway
Curraheen	71	Muskerry West	Kilnamartery	Macroom
Currahy	1,076	Muskerry West	Inchigeelagh	Macroom
Curraleigh	559	Muskerry West	Clondrohid	Macroom
Cusduff	264	Muskerry West	Kilmichael	Dunmanway
Cusloura	1,443	Muskerry West	Macroom	Macroom
Dangansallagh	708	Muskerry West	Ballyvourney	Macroom
Derragh	439	Muskerry West	Kilnamartery	Macroom
Derree	360	Muskerry West	Ballyvourney	Macroom
Derreen	111	Muskerry West	Drishane	Millstreet
Derreen	355	Muskerry West	Inchigeelagh	Macroom
Derreenabourky	280	Muskerry West	Inchigeelagh	Macroom
Derreenacullig	467	Muskerry West	Ballyvourney	Macroom
Derreenaling	1,670	Muskerry West	Ballyvourney	Macroom
Derreenclodig	204	Muskerry West	Inchigeelagh	Macroom
Derreendonee	438	Muskerry West	Inchigeelagh	Dunmanway
Derreenglass	454	Muskerry West	Inchigeelagh	Dunmanway
Derreenlunnig	542	Muskerry West	Inchigeelagh	Macroom
Derreennacartan	102	Muskerry West	Kilnamartery	Macroom
Derreennacusha	327	Muskerry West	Inchigeelagh	Dunmanway
Derrineanig	743	Muskerry West	Inchigeelagh	Macroom
Derrintogher	187	Muskerry West	Kilnamartery	Macroom
Derryfineen	480	Muskerry West	Kilnamartery	Macroom
Derrygortnacloghy	173	Muskerry West	Inchigeelagh	Dunmanway
Derrylahan	645	Muskerry West	Ballyvourney	Macroom
Derryleigh	400	Muskerry West	Inchigeelagh	Dunmanway
Derryleigh	465	Muskerry West	Clondrohid	Macroom
Derrynagree	320	Muskerry West	Inchigeelagh	Dunmanway
Derrynasaggart	1,812	Muskerry West	Ballyvourney	Macroom
Derryriordane North	205	Muskerry West	Inchigeelagh	Dunmanway
Derryriordane South	332	Muskerry West	Inchigeelagh	Dunmanway
Derryvacorneen	439	Muskerry West	Inchigeelagh	Dunmanway
Derryvaleen	198	Muskerry West	Inchigeelagh	Macroom
Derryvane	353	Muskerry West	Inchigeelagh	Macroom
Deshure	715	Muskerry West	Kilmichael	Dunmanway
Donoure East	173	Muskerry West	Kilcorney	Millstreet
Donoure Middle	111	Muskerry West	Kilcorney	Millstreet
Donoure West	174	Muskerry West	Kilcorney	Millstreet
Dooneens	594	Muskerry West	Drishane	Millstreet
Dooneens	751	Muskerry West	Inchigeelagh	Dunmanway
Drishane Beg	383	Muskerry West	Drishane	Millstreet
Drishane More	278	Muskerry West	Drishane	Millstreet
Dromagarry	221	Muskerry West	Clondrohid	Macroom
Dromanallig	328	Muskerry West	Inchigeelagh	Macroom
Drombeg	58	Muskerry West	Kilcorney	Millstreet
Dromcarra North	230	Muskerry West	Inchigeelagh	Macroom
Dromcarra South	276	Muskerry West	Inchigeelagh	Macroom
Dromduff	392	Muskerry West	Macroom	Macroom
Drominahilla	139	Muskerry West	Drishane	Millstreet
Dromkeen	344	Muskerry West	Kilmichael	Dunmanway
Dromleigh	87	Muskerry West	Kilmichael	Dunmanway
Dromonig	303	Muskerry West	Clondrohid	Macroom
Dromreague	434	Muskerry West	Kilnamartery	Macroom
Dromree	348	Muskerry West	Clondrohid	Macroom
Dundareirke	310	Muskerry West	Kilnamartery	Macroom
Dunisky	1,186	Muskerry West	Dunisky	Macroom
Dunmarklun	476	Muskerry West	Kilmurry	Macroom
Englishgarden	33	Muskerry West	Clondrohid	Macroom
Farranavarrigane	171	Muskerry West	Macloneigh	Macroom
Ferm	106	Muskerry West	Drishane	Millstreet
Finnanfield	361	Muskerry West	Kilcorney	Millstreet
Flats	141	Muskerry West	Ballyvourney	Macroom
Fuhiry	1,034	Muskerry West	Ballyvourney	Macroom
Garraneduff	335	Muskerry West	Drishane	Millstreet
Garranenagappul	592	Muskerry West	Clondrohid	Macroom
Garranereagh	1,135	Muskerry West	Kilmichael	Macroom
Garraneycarney	1,182	Muskerry West	Clondrohid	Macroom
Garryantornora	264	Muskerry West	Inchigeelagh	Dunmanway
Garrynapeaka	188	Muskerry West	Inchigeelagh	Dunmanway
Gearagh East	68	Muskerry West	Macloneigh	Macroom
Gearagh West	37	Muskerry West	Macloneigh	Macroom
Geararoe	76	Muskerry West	Drishane	Millstreet
Glananarig	393	Muskerry West	Clondrohid	Macroom
Glannarouge East	102	Muskerry West	Kilmurry	Macroom
Glannarouge West	158	Muskerry West	Kilmurry	Macroom
Glantane East	651	Muskerry West	Clondrohid	Macroom
Glantane West	601	Muskerry West	Clondrohid	Macroom
Glasheen	130	Muskerry West	Inchigeelagh	Macroom
Glebe	13	Muskerry West	Kilcorney	Millstreet
Glebe	249	Muskerry West	Inchigeelagh	Macroom
Glebe	40	Muskerry West	Kilnamartery	Macroom
Glebe	63	Muskerry West	Ballyvourney	Macroom
Glebe	76	Muskerry West	Clondrohid	Macroom
Glendav	1,387	Muskerry West	Clondrohid	Macroom
Glenleigh (Glaunleigh)	638	Muskerry West	Kilcorney	Millstreet
Gneeves	467	Muskerry West	Drishane	Millstreet
Gortacurrig	150	Muskerry West	Kilmichael	Dunmanway
Gortafludig	644	Muskerry West	Inchigeelagh	Macroom
Gortaknockane	191	Muskerry West	Inchigeelagh	Dunmanway
Gortanacra	233	Muskerry West	Ballyvourney	Macroom
Gortanddan	192	Muskerry West	Kilnamartery	Macroom
Gortaneadin	308	Muskerry West	Inchigeelagh	Dunmanway
Gortanimill	593	Muskerry West	Kilnamartery	Macroom
Gortatanavally	218	Muskerry West	Inchigeelagh	Dunmanway
Gortaveer	436	Muskerry West	Inchigeelagh	Macroom
Gortavehy East	512	Muskerry West	Drishane	Millstreet
Gortavehy West	536	Muskerry West	Drishane	Millstreet
Gortavranner (sometimes Gurtavranner)	289	Muskerry West	Clondrohid	Macroom
Gorteenadrolane	125	Muskerry West	Inchigeelagh	Dunmanway
Gorteennakilla	423	Muskerry West	Inchigeelagh	Macroom
Gortnabinna	780	Muskerry West	Kilnamartery	Macroom
Gortnacarriga	595	Muskerry West	Inchigeelagh	Dunmanway
Gortnaclogh	246	Muskerry West	Kilcorney	Millstreet
Gortnafunshion	103	Muskerry West	Ballyvourney	Macroom
Gortnagishagh	391	Muskerry West	Clondrohid	Macroom
Gortnagross	151	Muskerry West	Ballyvourney	Macroom
Gortnahoughtee	735	Muskerry West	Inchigeelagh	Dunmanway
Gortnalicky	319	Muskerry West	Clondrohid	Macroom
Gortnaloughra	224	Muskerry West	Inchigeelagh	Macroom
Gortnalour	487	Muskerry West	Inchigeelagh	Dunmanway
Gortnamona	136	Muskerry West	Inchigeelagh	Macroom
Gortnapeasty	190	Muskerry West	Clondrohid	Macroom
Gortnarea	282	Muskerry West	Inchigeelagh	Dunmanway
Gortnascarty	255	Muskerry West	Ballyvourney	Macroom
Gortnatubbrid	513	Muskerry West	Ballyvourney	Macroom
Gortsmoorane	186	Muskerry West	Inchigeelagh	Macroom
Gortyleahy	136	Muskerry West	Macroom	Macroom
Gortyrahilly	1,054	Muskerry West	Ballyvourney	Macroom
Graigue	594	Muskerry West	Inchigeelagh	Macroom
Greenville	454	Muskerry West	Kilmichael	Macroom
Gurteenflugh	235	Muskerry West	Inchigeelagh	Macroom
Gurteenowen	142	Muskerry West	Inchigeelagh	Macroom
Gurteenroe	447	Muskerry West	Macroom	Macroom
Haremount	646	Muskerry West	Kilmichael	Dunmanway
Horsemount North	495	Muskerry West	Kilcorney	Millstreet
Horsemount South	315	Muskerry West	Kilcorney	Millstreet
Horsemountmountain	631	Muskerry West	Kilcorney	Millstreet
Illauninagh East	186	Muskerry West	Inchigeelagh	Dunmanway
Illauninagh West	456	Muskerry West	Inchigeelagh	Dunmanway
Inchamore	1,635	Muskerry West	Ballyvourney	Macroom
Inches	400	Muskerry West	Drishane	Millstreet
Inchi Beg	447	Muskerry West	Inchigeelagh	Dunmanway
Inchi More	602	Muskerry West	Inchigeelagh	Dunmanway
Inchibrackane	93	Muskerry West	Kilnamartery	Macroom
Inchideraille	277	Muskerry West	Inchigeelagh	Dunmanway
**Inchigeelagh**	Town	Muskerry West	Inchigeelagh	Macroom
Inchigeelagh	105	Muskerry West	Inchigeelagh	Macroom
Inchigrady	158	Muskerry West	Inchigeelagh	Dunmanway
Inchileigh	262	Muskerry West	Drishane	Millstreet
Inchinahoury	158	Muskerry West	Clondrohid	Macroom
Inchinaneave	353	Muskerry West	Inchigeelagh	Macroom
Inchinashingane	505	Muskerry West	Macloneigh	Macroom
Inchineill	311	Muskerry West	Inchigeelagh	Macroom
Inchinlinane	226	Muskerry West	Clondrohid	Macroom
Inchinossig	331	Muskerry West	Inchigeelagh	Dunmanway
Inchisine	380	Muskerry West	Macloneigh	Macroom
Johnstown	613	Muskerry West	Kilmichael	Dunmanway
Kealvaugh Beg	229	Muskerry West	Inchigeelagh	Dunmanway
Kealvaugh More	390	Muskerry West	Inchigeelagh	Dunmanway
Keamcorravooly	415	Muskerry West	Inchigeelagh	Macroom
Kilbarry	166	Muskerry West	Inchigeelagh	Macroom
Kilbarry	697	Muskerry West	Kilmurry	Macroom
Kilboultragh	583	Muskerry West	Clondrohid	Macroom
Kilcorney	101	Muskerry West	Kilcorney	Millstreet
Kilgobnet	318	Muskerry West	Clondrohid	Macroom
Kill	224	Muskerry West	Macroom	Macroom
Killaclug	215	Muskerry West	Clondrohid	Macroom
Killeen	148	Muskerry West	Kilcorney	Millstreet
Killeen	156	Muskerry West	Ballyvourney	Macroom
Killmountain	189	Muskerry West	Clondrohid	Macroom
Killowen	221	Muskerry West	Drishane	Millstreet
Kilmakaroge	228	Muskerry West	Kilnamartery	Macroom
Kilmeedy East	316	Muskerry West	Drishane	Millstreet
Kilmeedy West	461	Muskerry West	Drishane	Millstreet
Kilmore	417	Muskerry West	Inchigeelagh	Macroom
Kilnagurteen	447	Muskerry West	Macroom	Macroom
Kilnarovanagh	396	Muskerry West	Macloneigh	Macroom
Kilpatrick	206	Muskerry West	Clondrohid	Macroom
Kippagh	689	Muskerry West	Drishane	Millstreet
Knockacareigh	186	Muskerry West	Kilmurry	Macroom
Knockagallane	616	Muskerry West	Drishane	Millstreet
Knockane	573	Muskerry West	Kilmichael	Dunmanway
Knockanereagh	149	Muskerry West	Kilmichael	Dunmanway
Knockanroe	191	Muskerry West	Kilcorney	Millstreet
Knockanure	616	Muskerry West	Ballyvourney	Macroom
Knockboy	200	Muskerry West	Kilmurry	Macroom
Knockgorm	94	Muskerry West	Kilcorney	Millstreet
Knocknagappul	1,807	Muskerry West	Clondrohid	Macroom
Knocknakilla	1,140	Muskerry West	Drishane	Millstreet
Knocknaloman	651	Muskerry West	Drishane	Millstreet
Knocknaneirk	556	Muskerry West	Kilmurry	Macroom
Knockraheen	999	Muskerry West	Clondrohid	Macroom
Knockroe	441	Muskerry West	Kilnamartery	Macroom
Knocksaharn	448	Muskerry West	Kilnamartery	Macroom
Kylefinchin	203	Muskerry West	Kilnamartery	Macroom
Labbadermody	541	Muskerry West	Clondrohid	Macroom
Lacka Beg	307	Muskerry West	Kilnamartery	Macroom
Lackabane	284	Muskerry West	Drishane	Millstreet
Lackabaun	396	Muskerry West	Inchigeelagh	Macroom
Lackaduff	200	Muskerry West	Macroom	Macroom
Lackaduv	328	Muskerry West	Clondrohid	Macroom
Lackaneen	308	Muskerry West	Clondrohid	Macroom
Lackareagh	547	Muskerry West	Kilmichael	Macroom
Lackdotia	411	Muskerry West	Drishane	Millstreet
Lackmore	224	Muskerry West	Kilnamartery	Macroom
Lacktify	167	Muskerry West	Clondrohid	Macroom
Laghtneill	167	Muskerry West	Kilmurry	Macroom
Lagneeve	102	Muskerry West	Inchigeelagh	Dunmanway
Laharan	187	Muskerry West	Kilcorney	Millstreet
Lisboy Beg	434	Muskerry West	Kilnamartery	Macroom
Lisboy More	533	Muskerry West	Kilnamartery	Macroom
Liscahane	767	Muskerry West	Drishane	Millstreet
Liscarrigane	553	Muskerry West	Clondrohid	Macroom
Liscreagh	405	Muskerry West	Drishane	Millstreet
Lisnacuddy	227	Muskerry West	Kilmichael	Dunmanway
Lissacapia	55	Muskerry West	Kilcorney	Millstreet
Lissacresig	251	Muskerry West	Clondrohid	Macroom
Lissardagh	456	Muskerry West	Kilmurry	Macroom
Lumnagh Beg	76	Muskerry West	Ballyvourney	Macroom
Lumnagh More	183	Muskerry West	Ballyvourney	Macroom
Lyrenageeha	484	Muskerry West	Inchigeelagh	Macroom
**Macroom**	Town	Muskerry West	Macroom	Macroom
Maghereen	32	Muskerry West	Macroom	Macroom
Mamucky	221	Muskerry West	Kilmichael	Dunmanway
Maulmore	207	Muskerry West	Inchigeelagh	Macroom
Maulnagrough	381	Muskerry West	Clondrohid	Macroom
Maulnahorna	1,633	Muskerry West	Clondrohid	Macroom
Milleen	342	Muskerry West	Inchigeelagh	Macroom
Milleeny	1,504	Muskerry West	Ballyvourney	Macroom
**Millstreet**	Town	Muskerry West	Drishane	Millstreet
Milmorane	431	Muskerry West	Inchigeelagh	Macroom
Moanflugh	415	Muskerry West	Clondrohid	Macroom
Monavaddra	476	Muskerry West	Inchigeelagh	Dunmanway
Moneycusker	417	Muskerry West	Kilmichael	Dunmanway
Mountleader	254	Muskerry West	Drishane	Millstreet
Mountmusic	502	Muskerry West	Kilmichael	Dunmanway
Mullenroe	689	Muskerry West	Clondrohid	Macroom
Murnaghbeg	281	Muskerry West	Ballyvourney	Macroom
Mushera	452	Muskerry West	Kilcorney	Millstreet
Mushera	649	Muskerry West	Drishane	Millstreet
Parkanillane	154	Muskerry West	Kilnamartery	Macroom
Poularick	726	Muskerry West	Kilmurry	Macroom
Prohus	278	Muskerry West	Clondrohid	Macroom
Rahalisk	1,075	Muskerry West	Macroom	Macroom
Rahoonagh East	331	Muskerry West	Ballyvourney	Macroom
Rahoonagh West	367	Muskerry West	Ballyvourney	Macroom
Raleigh North	267	Muskerry West	Kilnamartery	Macroom
Raleigh South	340	Muskerry West	Kilnamartery	Macroom
Rath East	344	Muskerry West	Ballyvourney	Macroom
Rath West	259	Muskerry West	Ballyvourney	Macroom
Rathduane	788	Muskerry West	Drishane	Millstreet
Rathgaskig	607	Muskerry West	Inchigeelagh	Macroom
Reanabobul	662	Muskerry West	Ballyvourney	Macroom
Reanacaheragh	438	Muskerry West	Kilmichael	Dunmanway
Reananerree	469	Muskerry West	Kilnamartery	Macroom
Rockborough	115	Muskerry West	Macroom	Macroom
Rossalougha	923	Muskerry West	Inchigeelagh	Macroom
Rossmore	492	Muskerry West	Inchigeelagh	Macroom
Rossnakilla	246	Muskerry West	Kilmichael	Dunmanway
Scrahan	130	Muskerry West	Inchigeelagh	Dunmanway
Scrahanagown	416	Muskerry West	Ballyvourney	Macroom
Scrahanard	350	Muskerry West	Clondrohid	Macroom
Scrahanmore	187	Muskerry West	Inchigeelagh	Macroom
Scronagare	212	Muskerry West	Clondrohid	Macroom
Shanacashel	751	Muskerry West	Kilmichael	Dunmanway
Shanacashelkneeves	336	Muskerry West	Kilmichael	Dunmanway
Shanacloon	342	Muskerry West	Ballyvourney	Macroom
Shanakill	255	Muskerry West	Kilcorney	Millstreet
Shanvallyshane	234	Muskerry West	Kilnamartery	Macroom
Silvergrove	395	Muskerry West	Inchigeelagh	Macroom
Sleveen East	528	Muskerry West	Macroom	Macroom
Sleveen West	226	Muskerry West	Macroom	Macroom
Slieveowen	335	Muskerry West	Kilmichael	Dunmanway
Slievereagh	1,646	Muskerry West	Ballyvourney	Macroom
Teeranassig	294	Muskerry West	Inchigeelagh	Dunmanway
Teerbeg	176	Muskerry West	Clondrohid	Macroom
Teereeven	394	Muskerry West	Kilmurry	Macroom
Teergay	235	Muskerry West	Inchigeelagh	Macroom
Terrelton	452	Muskerry West	Kilmichael	Dunmanway
Tober	109	Muskerry West	Drishane	Millstreet
Togher	171	Muskerry West	Ballyvourney	Macroom
Tooms East	609	Muskerry West	Macloneigh	Macroom
Tooms West	592	Muskerry West	Macloneigh	Macroom
Toomsbeg	128	Muskerry West	Macloneigh	Macroom
Toonlane	254	Muskerry West	Ballyvourney	Macroom
Toorboney	367	Muskerry West	Drishane	Millstreet
Tooreenalour	532	Muskerry West	Inchigeelagh	Dunmanway
Tooreenbane	594	Muskerry West	Drishane	Millstreet
Tooreenduff	437	Muskerry West	Inchigeelagh	Dunmanway
Tooreenlahard	139	Muskerry West	Inchigeelagh	Macroom
Tooreennanean	201	Muskerry West	Inchigeelagh	Dunmanway
Tullatreada	349	Muskerry West	Macroom	Macroom
Tullig	1,730	Muskerry West	Drishane	Millstreet
Turnaspidogy	827	Muskerry West	Inchigeelagh	Macroom
Ullanes East	356	Muskerry West	Ballyvourney	Macroom
Ullanes West	614	Muskerry West	Ballyvourney	Macroom

== See also ==
- Lists of townlands of County Cork
- List of civil parishes of County Cork
