= Cenél =

Cenél is a surname. Notable people with the surname include:

- Cenél Conaill, the name of the "kindred" or descendants of Conall Gulban, son of Niall Noígiallach defined by oral and recorded history
- Cenél nEógain (in English, Cenel Eogan) is the name of the "kindred" or descendants of Eógan mac Néill, son of Niall Noígiallach who founded the kingdom of Tír Eógain in the 5th century
- Kin groups forming part of Dal Riata, most of which, after a varied evolution eventually became the Scottish region of Argyll
  - Cenél nÓengusa, a kin group who ruled the island of Islay, and perhaps nearby Colonsay. After spending 4 centuries as part of Norway, and another 4 as part of the quasi-independent Lordship of the Isles, this region became Scottish in the late 15th century.
  - Cenél nGabráin, the "kindred" of Gabrán, who ruled Kintyre, Knapdale (at that time including the lands between Loch Awe and Loch Fyne - Craignish, Ardscotnish, Glassary, and Glenary), the island of Arran, and Moyle. Kintyre and the southern half of Knapdale (the part still called Knapdale) followed the same pattern of historical evolution as Islay. Moyle became part of Ireland, while the remainder became one of the founding parts of the early Scottish state. Apart from Moyle, these now form the south west of Argyll.
  - Cenél Comgaill, the "kindred" of Comgall, who ruled over, and gave their name to the district of Cowal, which now forms the south east of Argyll.
  - Cenél Loairn, the name of the "kindred"/descendants of Loarn mac Eirc, who established Lorn (which at that time included the island of Mull). Lorn later became a province of Scotland in its own right, but is now the northern part of Argyll.
