= List of townlands of the barony of East Carbery (West Division) =

This is a sortable table of the townlands in the barony of East Carbery (W.D.), County Cork, Ireland. Duplicate names occur where there is more than one townland with the same name in the barony, and also where a townland is known by two alternative names. Names marked in bold typeface are towns and villages, and the word Town appears for those entries in the area column.

== Townland list ==
Townland	Area (acres)	Barony	Civil parish	Poor law union
Acres	275	East Carbery (W.D.)	Fanlobbus	Dunmanway
Adam's Island	1	East Carbery (W.D.)	Kilfaughnabeg	Skibbereen
Aghalinane	305	East Carbery (W.D.)	Kinneigh	Dunmanway
Aghatubrid Beg	156	East Carbery (W.D.)	Kilfaughnabeg	Skibbereen
Aghatubrid More	274	East Carbery (W.D.)	Kilfaughnabeg	Skibbereen
Ahakeera	620	East Carbery (W.D.)	Fanlobbus	Dunmanway
Anaharlick	353	East Carbery (W.D.)	Kinneigh	Dunmanway
Annees	454	East Carbery (W.D.)	Fanlobbus	Dunmanway
Ardagh East	430	East Carbery (W.D.)	Ross	Clonakilty
Ardagh West	143	East Carbery (W.D.)	Ross	Clonakilty
Ardcahan	824	East Carbery (W.D.)	Fanlobbus	Dunmanway
Ardkilleen	405	East Carbery (W.D.)	Kinneigh	Dunmanway
Ardogeena	171	East Carbery (W.D.)	Durrus	Bantry
Aultagh	293	East Carbery (W.D.)	Kilmichael	Dunmanway
Aultaghreagh	206	East Carbery (W.D.)	Kilmichael	Dunmanway
Ballaghanure	207	East Carbery (W.D.)	Kinneigh	Dunmanway
Ballinaclogh	210	East Carbery (W.D.)	Ross	Clonakilty
Ballingurteen	157	East Carbery (W.D.)	Kilmeen	Dunmanway
Ballinvard	199	East Carbery (W.D.)	Kilmeane	Clonakilty
Ballyhalwick	576	East Carbery (W.D.)	Fanlobbus	Dunmanway
Ballyhoulahan	77	East Carbery (W.D.)	Ross	Clonakilty
Ballyroe	271	East Carbery (W.D.)	Kilmacabea	Skibbereen
Ballyvelone East	256	East Carbery (W.D.)	Kinneigh	Dunmanway
Ballyvelone West	422	East Carbery (W.D.)	Kinneigh	Dunmanway
Ballyvireen	287	East Carbery (W.D.)	Ross	Clonakilty
Balteenbrack	432	East Carbery (W.D.)	Fanlobbus	Dunmanway
Barleyhill East	348	East Carbery (W.D.)	Ross	Clonakilty
Barleyhill West	306	East Carbery (W.D.)	Ross	Clonakilty
Behagh	497	East Carbery (W.D.)	Fanlobbus	Dunmanway
Behaguliane	810	East Carbery (W.D.)	Fanlobbus	Dunmanway
Belrose Lower	226	East Carbery (W.D.)	Kinneigh	Bandon
Belrose Upper	433	East Carbery (W.D.)	Kinneigh	Bandon
Benduff	432	East Carbery (W.D.)	Ross	Clonakilty
Bohonagh	368	East Carbery (W.D.)	Ross	Clonakilty
Brookpark	78	East Carbery (W.D.)	Fanlobbus	Dunmanway
Brulea	167	East Carbery (W.D.)	Kilfaughnabeg	Skibbereen
Buckree	183	East Carbery (W.D.)	Kinneigh	Dunmanway
Burgatia	742	East Carbery (W.D.)	Ross	Clonakilty
Caher	315	East Carbery (W.D.)	Kilmeen	Clonakilty
Caher	616	East Carbery (W.D.)	Kinneigh	Dunmanway
Caherbeg	375	East Carbery (W.D.)	Rathbarry	Clonakilty
Caherkirky	434	East Carbery (W.D.)	Kilmeen	Clonakilty
Cahermore	488	East Carbery (W.D.)	Ross	Clonakilty
Cappadineen	106	East Carbery (W.D.)	Fanlobbus	Dunmanway
Cappeen East	435	East Carbery (W.D.)	Kinneigh	Dunmanway
Cappeen West	315	East Carbery (W.D.)	Kinneigh	Dunmanway
Carhoogarriff	401	East Carbery (W.D.)	Kilmacabea	Skibbereen
Carrigagrenane	470	East Carbery (W.D.)	Ross	Clonakilty
Carrigbaun	285	East Carbery (W.D.)	Kilmacabea	Skibbereen
Carrigfadda	614	East Carbery (W.D.)	Ross	Clonakilty
Carriglusky	63	East Carbery (W.D.)	Kilfaughnabeg	Skibbereen
Carrigskullihy	381	East Carbery (W.D.)	Fanlobbus	Dunmanway
Cashel	448	East Carbery (W.D.)	Kilmacabea	Skibbereen
Castlelands	224	East Carbery (W.D.)	Kinneigh	Bandon
**Castletown**	Town	East Carbery (W.D.)	Kinneigh	Dunmanway
Castletown	464	East Carbery (W.D.)	Kinneigh	Dunmanway
Castleventry	544	East Carbery (W.D.)	Castleventry	Clonakilty
Clash	91	East Carbery (W.D.)	Kinneigh	Dunmanway
Clashatarriff	274	East Carbery (W.D.)	Castleventry	Clonakilty
Clashnacrona East	181	East Carbery (W.D.)	Fanlobbus	Dunmanway
Clashnacrona West	286	East Carbery (W.D.)	Fanlobbus	Dunmanway
Clogher	442	East Carbery (W.D.)	Inchigeelagh	Dunmanway
Clonomara	207	East Carbery (W.D.)	Kinneigh	Dunmanway
Cloonareague	82	East Carbery (W.D.)	Kinneigh	Dunmanway
Clooncorban	272	East Carbery (W.D.)	Kilmeen	Clonakilty
Cloonies East	127	East Carbery (W.D.)	Fanlobbus	Dunmanway
Cloonkeen East	151	East Carbery (W.D.)	Kilmacabea	Skibbereen
Cloonkirgeen	361	East Carbery (W.D.)	Kilmeen	Dunmanway
Cloonties West	180	East Carbery (W.D.)	Fanlobbus	Dunmanway
Cloontiquirk	276	East Carbery (W.D.)	Fanlobbus	Dunmanway
Connagh	309	East Carbery (W.D.)	Kinneigh	Dunmanway
Coolabaun	107	East Carbery (W.D.)	Kinneigh	Dunmanway
Cooladereen	157	East Carbery (W.D.)	Kilmacabea	Skibbereen
Coolcaum	230	East Carbery (W.D.)	Inchigeelagh	Dunmanway
Coolcraheen	265	East Carbery (W.D.)	Castleventry	Clonakilty
Cooleenagow	185	East Carbery (W.D.)	Fanlobbus	Dunmanway
Coolkellure	545	East Carbery (W.D.)	Fanlobbus	Dunmanway
Coolmountain	963	East Carbery (W.D.)	Inchigeelagh	Dunmanway
Coolnaconarty	128	East Carbery (W.D.)	Kilkerranmore	Dunmanway
Coolnaconarty	268	East Carbery (W.D.)	Kilmeen	Dunmanway
Coolnagay	315	East Carbery (W.D.)	Castleventry	Clonakilty
Coolshinagh	181	East Carbery (W.D.)	Kilbrittain	Bandon
Coolsnaghtig	613	East Carbery (W.D.)	Fanlobbus	Dunmanway
Coom	455	East Carbery (W.D.)	Fanlobbus	Dunmanway
Coonties	358	East Carbery (W.D.)	Kilfaughnabeg	Skibbereen
Cooranig	652	East Carbery (W.D.)	Fanlobbus	Dunmanway
Coorycullane	202	East Carbery (W.D.)	Fanlobbus	Dunmanway
Corran Middle	191	East Carbery (W.D.)	Kilmacabea	Skibbereen
Corran North	473	East Carbery (W.D.)	Kilmacabea	Skibbereen
Corran South	509	East Carbery (W.D.)	Kilmacabea	Skibbereen
Cregg	190	East Carbery (W.D.)	Kilfaughnabeg	Clonakilty
Creggane	84	East Carbery (W.D.)	Ross	Clonakilty
Crushterra	361	East Carbery (W.D.)	Kilmichael	Dunmanway
Cullane East	288	East Carbery (W.D.)	Kilmacabea	Skibbereen
Cullane West	165	East Carbery (W.D.)	Kilmacabea	Skibbereen
Cullenagh	821	East Carbery (W.D.)	Fanlobbus	Dunmanway
Currabwee	469	East Carbery (W.D.)	Drinagh	Dunmanway
Curradrinagh	598	East Carbery (W.D.)	Kilmichael	Dunmanway
Curraghnaloughra	356	East Carbery (W.D.)	Drinagh	Skibbereen
Curraheen	86	East Carbery (W.D.)	Ross	Clonakilty
Darkwood	70	East Carbery (W.D.)	Fanlobbus	Dunmanway
Demesne	279	East Carbery (W.D.)	Fanlobbus	Dunmanway
Derragh	781	East Carbery (W.D.)	Fanlobbus	Dunmanway
Derreen	252	East Carbery (W.D.)	Kilmeen	Dunmanway
Derreens	363	East Carbery (W.D.)	Fanlobbus	Dunmanway
Derrigra	231	East Carbery (W.D.)	Kinneigh	Bandon
Derry	471	East Carbery (W.D.)	Ross	Clonakilty
Derrybaun	80	East Carbery (W.D.)	Castleventry	Clonakilty
Derryduff	519	East Carbery (W.D.)	Fanlobbus	Dunmanway
Derrylahan	509	East Carbery (W.D.)	Fanlobbus	Dunmanway
Derrynacaheragh	423	East Carbery (W.D.)	Fanlobbus	Dunmanway
Derrynasafagh	416	East Carbery (W.D.)	Fanlobbus	Dunmanway
Downeen	885	East Carbery (W.D.)	Ross	Clonakilty
Drinagh East	448	East Carbery (W.D.)	Drinagh	Dunmanway
Drinagh West	270	East Carbery (W.D.)	Drinagh	Dunmanway
Drom	211	East Carbery (W.D.)	Kilfaughnabeg	Skibbereen
Dromavane	491	East Carbery (W.D.)	Murragh	Bandon
Drombeg	180	East Carbery (W.D.)	Kilfaughnabeg	Skibbereen
Dromdeegy	385	East Carbery (W.D.)	Fanlobbus	Dunmanway
Dromdrasdil	1,161	East Carbery (W.D.)	Fanlobbus	Dunmanway
Dromerk	279	East Carbery (W.D.)	Fanlobbus	Dunmanway
Dromfeagh	399	East Carbery (W.D.)	Kinneigh	Dunmanway
Dromidiclogh	293	East Carbery (W.D.)	Kinneigh	Dunmanway
Dromidiclogh West	312	East Carbery (W.D.)	Kinneigh	Dunmanway
Dromillihy	423	East Carbery (W.D.)	Kilmacabea	Skibbereen
Dromleena	692	East Carbery (W.D.)	Fanlobbus	Dunmanway
Dromlough	248	East Carbery (W.D.)	Kilmichael	Dunmanway
Dungannon	97	East Carbery (W.D.)	Kilmacabea	Skibbereen
**Dunmanway**	Town	East Carbery (W.D.)	Fanlobbus	Dunmanway
Dunmanway North	336	East Carbery (W.D.)	Fanlobbus	Dunmanway
Dunmanway South	83	East Carbery (W.D.)	Fanlobbus	Dunmanway
Dunscullib	168	East Carbery (W.D.)	Kilmacabea	Skibbereen
English Island	7	East Carbery (W.D.)	Ross	Clonakilty
**Enniskeen**	Town	East Carbery (W.D.)	Kinneigh	Bandon
Eve Island	1	East Carbery (W.D.)	Kilfaughnabeg	Skibbereen
Farlehanes	213	East Carbery (W.D.)	Kilkerranmore	Dunmanway
Farlehanes	352	East Carbery (W.D.)	Kilmeen	Dunmanway
Farnanes	374	East Carbery (W.D.)	Fanlobbus	Dunmanway
Farranacounter	94	East Carbery (W.D.)	Ross	Clonakilty
Farranmareen	493	East Carbery (W.D.)	Kinneigh	Bandon
Farrannahineeny	230	East Carbery (W.D.)	Kilmichael	Dunmanway
Foxhall	390	East Carbery (W.D.)	Castleventry	Clonakilty
Freahanes	454	East Carbery (W.D.)	Ross	Clonakilty
Froe	743	East Carbery (W.D.)	Ross	Clonakilty
Gallane	243	East Carbery (W.D.)	Ross	Clonakilty
Gallanes	353	East Carbery (W.D.)	Kilnagross	Clonakilty
Garland	189	East Carbery (W.D.)	Kinneigh	Dunmanway
Garrane	133	East Carbery (W.D.)	Ross	Clonakilty
Garranecore	189	East Carbery (W.D.)	Ross	Clonakilty
Garranes	452	East Carbery (W.D.)	Fanlobbus	Dunmanway
Garrybaun	90	East Carbery (W.D.)	Fanlobbus	Dunmanway
Glan	395	East Carbery (W.D.)	Fanlobbus	Dunmanway
Glanbrack	534	East Carbery (W.D.)	Ross	Clonakilty
**Glandore**	Town	East Carbery (W.D.)	Kilfaughnabeg	Skibbereen
Glanycarney	1,206	East Carbery (W.D.)	Kilmocomoge	Bantry
Glebe	26	East Carbery (W.D.)	Kilmeen	Clonakilty
Gortaleen	185	East Carbery (W.D.)	Kinneigh	Dunmanway
Gortanure	302	East Carbery (W.D.)	Fanlobbus	Dunmanway
Gortnadihy	145	East Carbery (W.D.)	Kilmeen	Dunmanway
Gortnamucklagh	693	East Carbery (W.D.)	Fanlobbus	Dunmanway
Gortroe	155	East Carbery (W.D.)	Kilmacabea	Skibbereen
Gortroe	516	East Carbery (W.D.)	Kilmichael	Dunmanway
Gortyowen	84	East Carbery (W.D.)	Kilfaughnabeg	Skibbereen
Goulacullin	1,426	East Carbery (W.D.)	Fanlobbus	Dunmanway
Gurteen	177	East Carbery (W.D.)	Kilmichael	Dunmanway
Gurteenaduige	290	East Carbery (W.D.)	Kilmacabea	Skibbereen
Gurteennasowna	508	East Carbery (W.D.)	Fanlobbus	Dunmanway
Gurteenroe	291	East Carbery (W.D.)	Kinneigh	Dunmanway
Illaunmore	1	East Carbery (W.D.)	Kilfaughnabeg	Skibbereen
Inch East	587	East Carbery (W.D.)	Fanlobbus	Dunmanway
Inch West	295	East Carbery (W.D.)	Fanlobbus	Dunmanway
Inchanadreen	236	East Carbery (W.D.)	Fanlobbus	Dunmanway
Inchinattin	399	East Carbery (W.D.)	Castleventry	Clonakilty
Inchincurka	668	East Carbery (W.D.)	Kilmichael	Dunmanway
Inchireagh	301	East Carbery (W.D.)	Fanlobbus	Dunmanway
Inchnanoon	127	East Carbery (W.D.)	Kilmacabea	Skibbereen
Keamnabricka	89	East Carbery (W.D.)	Ross	Clonakilty
Keelaraheen	413	East Carbery (W.D.)	Fanlobbus	Dunmanway
Keenrath	424	East Carbery (W.D.)	Fanlobbus	Dunmanway
Kilbarry	1,230	East Carbery (W.D.)	Fanlobbus	Dunmanway
Kilbeg	200	East Carbery (W.D.)	Kilfaughnabeg	Skibbereen
Kildee	550	East Carbery (W.D.)	Kilmeen	Dunmanway
Kilfinnan	386	East Carbery (W.D.)	Kilfaughnabeg	Skibbereen
Killacoosane	66	East Carbery (W.D.)	Kilfaughnabeg	Skibbereen
Killeenleagh	101	East Carbery (W.D.)	Ross	Clonakilty
Killeigh	235	East Carbery (W.D.)	Castleventry	Clonakilty
Killinga	722	East Carbery (W.D.)	Kilmacabea	Skibbereen
Kilmacabea	354	East Carbery (W.D.)	Kilmacabea	Skibbereen
Kilmalooda	156	East Carbery (W.D.)	Fanlobbus	Dunmanway
Kilmeen	261	East Carbery (W.D.)	Kilmeen	Clonakilty
Kilnacally	384	East Carbery (W.D.)	Kilmacabea	Skibbereen
Kilnacranagh East	486	East Carbery (W.D.)	Kinneigh	Bandon
Kilnacranagh West	423	East Carbery (W.D.)	Kinneigh	Bandon
Kilnadur	401	East Carbery (W.D.)	Kilmichael	Dunmanway
Kilronane East	476	East Carbery (W.D.)	Fanlobbus	Dunmanway
Kilronane West	562	East Carbery (W.D.)	Fanlobbus	Dunmanway
Kinneigh	428	East Carbery (W.D.)	Kinneigh	Dunmanway
Kippagh	856	East Carbery (W.D.)	Drinagh	Dunmanway
Knockaghaduff	332	East Carbery (W.D.)	Fanlobbus	Dunmanway
Knockane	346	East Carbery (W.D.)	Kilmeen	Dunmanway
Knockanenacrohy	158	East Carbery (W.D.)	Kilmacabea	Skibbereen
Knockariblihane	334	East Carbery (W.D.)	Kilmichael	Dunmanway
Knockarudane	81	East Carbery (W.D.)	Kilfaughnabeg	Skibbereen
Knockavoher	282	East Carbery (W.D.)	Kilmacabea	Skibbereen
Knockawaddra	455	East Carbery (W.D.)	Kilmeen	Dunmanway
Knockduff	212	East Carbery (W.D.)	Fanlobbus	Dunmanway
Knockea	545	East Carbery (W.D.)	Kilmeen	Clonakilty
Knockeenboy	263	East Carbery (W.D.)	Fanlobbus	Dunmanway
Knockfeen	188	East Carbery (W.D.)	Castleventry	Clonakilty
Knockmore	553	East Carbery (W.D.)	Kilmacabea	Skibbereen
Knocks	309	East Carbery (W.D.)	Kilkerranmore	Clonakilty
Knockskagh	826	East Carbery (W.D.)	Kilmacabea	Skibbereen
Lackabaun	372	East Carbery (W.D.)	Inchigeelagh	Dunmanway
Lackanashinnagh	224	East Carbery (W.D.)	Kinneigh	Dunmanway
Laravoolta	390	East Carbery (W.D.)	Kinneigh	Bandon
**Leap**	Town	East Carbery (W.D.)	Kilmacabea	Skibbereen
Letter	367	East Carbery (W.D.)	Kilmeen	Clonakilty
Lettergorman	737	East Carbery (W.D.)	Drinagh	Dunmanway
Lisbealad East	536	East Carbery (W.D.)	Drinagh	Dunmanway
Lisbealad West	347	East Carbery (W.D.)	Drinagh	Dunmanway
Liscubba	462	East Carbery (W.D.)	Kilmeen	Clonakilty
Lisheenleigh	462	East Carbery (W.D.)	Fanlobbus	Dunmanway
Lisnabrinny	346	East Carbery (W.D.)	Kilmeen	Dunmanway
Lissacroneen	213	East Carbery (W.D.)	Kinneigh	Dunmanway
Lissard	87	East Carbery (W.D.)	Ross	Clonakilty
Lissarourke	512	East Carbery (W.D.)	Kinneigh	Bandon
Lissicorrane	337	East Carbery (W.D.)	Kinneigh	Dunmanway
Madranna	128	East Carbery (W.D.)	Kilmacabea	Skibbereen
Mallabracka	333	East Carbery (W.D.)	Fanlobbus	Dunmanway
Mallow	233	East Carbery (W.D.)	Kinneigh	Dunmanway
Manch East	321	East Carbery (W.D.)	Fanlobbus	Dunmanway
Manch Middle	265	East Carbery (W.D.)	Fanlobbus	Dunmanway
Manch West	531	East Carbery (W.D.)	Fanlobbus	Dunmanway
Maugh	85	East Carbery (W.D.)	Fanlobbus	Dunmanway
Maul	114	East Carbery (W.D.)	Ross	Clonakilty
Maulagow	205	East Carbery (W.D.)	Kilfaughnabeg	Skibbereen
Maulanimirsh	621	East Carbery (W.D.)	Fanlobbus	Dunmanway
Maulashangarry	107	East Carbery (W.D.)	Fanlobbus	Dunmanway
Maulatanvally	622	East Carbery (W.D.)	Ross	Clonakilty
Maulcorragh	35	East Carbery (W.D.)	Kilmeen	Dunmanway
Maulmareen	73	East Carbery (W.D.)	Kilfaughnabeg	Skibbereen
Maulvirane	302	East Carbery (W.D.)	Castleventry	Clonakilty
Maulyregan	681	East Carbery (W.D.)	Ross	Clonakilty
Milane	1,034	East Carbery (W.D.)	Fanlobbus	Dunmanway
Milleenahilan	85	East Carbery (W.D.)	Kilmacabea	Skibbereen
Milleenanannig	448	East Carbery (W.D.)	Fanlobbus	Dunmanway
Milleennagun	489	East Carbery (W.D.)	Kilmeen	Dunmanway
Mohona	424	East Carbery (W.D.)	Fanlobbus	Dunmanway
Moneygaff East	666	East Carbery (W.D.)	Kinneigh	Dunmanway
Moneygaff West	602	East Carbery (W.D.)	Kinneigh	Dunmanway
Moneylea	249	East Carbery (W.D.)	Inchigeelagh	Dunmanway
Moneynacroha	382	East Carbery (W.D.)	Kinneigh	Dunmanway
Moneyreague	720	East Carbery (W.D.)	Fanlobbus	Dunmanway
Moreagh	261	East Carbery (W.D.)	Fanlobbus	Dunmanway
Murragh	408	East Carbery (W.D.)	Murragh	Bandon
Neaskin	398	East Carbery (W.D.)	Fanlobbus	Dunmanway
Nedinagh East	427	East Carbery (W.D.)	Fanlobbus	Dunmanway
Nedinagh West	433	East Carbery (W.D.)	Fanlobbus	Dunmanway
Paddock	179	East Carbery (W.D.)	Drinagh	Skibbereen
Paddock	269	East Carbery (W.D.)	Kinneigh	Dunmanway
Palaceanne	211	East Carbery (W.D.)	Kinneigh	Bandon
Pookeen	448	East Carbery (W.D.)	Fanlobbus	Dunmanway
Reanascreena North	365	East Carbery (W.D.)	Ross	Clonakilty
Reanascreena South	421	East Carbery (W.D.)	Ross	Clonakilty
Reavilleen	204	East Carbery (W.D.)	Ross	Clonakilty
Reavouler	800	East Carbery (W.D.)	Kilmacabea	Skibbereen
Reenogrena	253	East Carbery (W.D.)	Kilfaughnabeg	Skibbereen
**Ross Carbery**	Town	East Carbery (W.D.)	Ross	Clonakilty
Rossmore	456	East Carbery (W.D.)	Kilmeen	Clonakilty
Rouryglen	263	East Carbery (W.D.)	Ross	Clonakilty
Rushanes	168	East Carbery (W.D.)	Kilfaughnabeg	Skibbereen
Rushfield	216	East Carbery (W.D.)	Kinneigh	Bandon
Sarue	494	East Carbery (W.D.)	Castleventry	Clonakilty
Shanaclogh	145	East Carbery (W.D.)	Kinneigh	Dunmanway
Shanacrane East	866	East Carbery (W.D.)	Inchigeelagh	Dunmanway
Shanacrane West	528	East Carbery (W.D.)	Inchigeelagh	Dunmanway
Shanagh	363	East Carbery (W.D.)	Fanlobbus	Dunmanway
Shandrum	243	East Carbery (W.D.)	Drinagh	Skibbereen
Shanlaragh	374	East Carbery (W.D.)	Kilmichael	Dunmanway
Shean	63	East Carbery (W.D.)	Fanlobbus	Dunmanway
Shehy Beg	720	East Carbery (W.D.)	Inchigeelagh	Dunmanway
Shehy More	645	East Carbery (W.D.)	Inchigeelagh	Dunmanway
Shiplough	423	East Carbery (W.D.)	Fanlobbus	Dunmanway
Sillahertane	464	East Carbery (W.D.)	Fanlobbus	Dunmanway
Sleenoge	118	East Carbery (W.D.)	Kinneigh	Dunmanway
Sranaviddoge	619	East Carbery (W.D.)	Murragh	Bandon
Teadies Lower	204	East Carbery (W.D.)	Kinneigh	Bandon
Teadies Upper	595	East Carbery (W.D.)	Kinneigh	Bandon
Teenah	284	East Carbery (W.D.)	Kinneigh	Dunmanway
Three-Gneeves	178	East Carbery (W.D.)	Kilmacabea	Skibbereen
Tinneel	133	East Carbery (W.D.)	Ross	Clonakilty
Togher	661	East Carbery (W.D.)	Fanlobbus	Dunmanway
Tonafora	169	East Carbery (W.D.)	Fanlobbus	Dunmanway
Toom	474	East Carbery (W.D.)	Fanlobbus	Dunmanway
Tooreen	152	East Carbery (W.D.)	Inchigeelagh	Dunmanway
Toughbaun	441	East Carbery (W.D.)	Drinagh	Skibbereen
Tralong	283	East Carbery (W.D.)	Ross	Clonakilty
Tullagh	406	East Carbery (W.D.)	Inchigeelagh	Dunmanway
Tullig	402	East Carbery (W.D.)	Kilmacabea	Skibbereen
Tulligee	131	East Carbery (W.D.)	Ross	Clonakilty
Tullyglass	202	East Carbery (W.D.)	Kilmeen	Dunmanway
Underhill	31	East Carbery (W.D.)	Fanlobbus	Dunmanway
