= Ballinard, Desertserges =

Townland in County Cork, Ireland

Coordinates: 51.704557°N 8.942071°W

Ballinard (Irish: Baile An Aird) is a townland in the parish of Desertserges, County Cork, Ireland.
