= List of townlands of the barony of Kinalmeaky =

This is a sortable table of the townlands in the barony of Kinalmeaky, County Cork, Ireland. Duplicate names occur where there is more than one townland with the same name in the barony, and also where a townland is known by two alternative names. Names marked in bold typeface are towns and villages, and the word Town appears for those entries in the area column.

== Townland list ==
Townland	Area (acres)	Barony	Civil parish	Poor law union
**Bandon**	Town	Kinalmeaky	Ballymodan	Bandon
**Bandon**	Town	Kinalmeaky	Kilbrogan	Bandon
Bengour East	1,217	Kinalmeaky	Murragh	Bandon
Bengour West	1,348	Kinalmeaky	Murragh	Bandon
Boggra	184	Kinalmeaky	Templemartin	Bandon
Callatrim	625	Kinalmeaky	Kilbrogan	Bandon
Cappaknockane	585	Kinalmeaky	Desertserges	Bandon
Carhoon East	273	Kinalmeaky	Kilbrogan	Bandon
Carhoon West	530	Kinalmeaky	Kilbrogan	Bandon
Carrigafroca	122	Kinalmeaky	Templemartin	Bandon
Cashel Beg	459	Kinalmeaky	Desertserges	Bandon
Cashel Commons	101	Kinalmeaky	Desertserges	Bandon
Cashel More	654	Kinalmeaky	Desertserges	Bandon
Castlebernard	398	Kinalmeaky	Ballymodan	Bandon
Castlenalact	274	Kinalmeaky	Templemartin	Bandon
Castlenalact	454	Kinalmeaky	Brinny	Bandon
Clancool Beg	536	Kinalmeaky	Ballymodan	Bandon
Clancool More	374	Kinalmeaky	Ballymodan	Bandon
Commons	270	Kinalmeaky	Templemartin	Bandon
Coolanagh	633	Kinalmeaky	Murragh	Bandon
Coolfadda	380	Kinalmeaky	Kilbrogan	Bandon
Courtleigh	284	Kinalmeaky	Murragh	Bandon
Curravarahane	327	Kinalmeaky	Ballymodan	Bandon
Curravordy	751	Kinalmeaky	Templemartin	Bandon
Curryclogh	365	Kinalmeaky	Kilbrogan	Bandon
Dangan Beg	181	Kinalmeaky	Ballymodan	Bandon
Dangan More	365	Kinalmeaky	Desertserges	Bandon
Derrycool	408	Kinalmeaky	Kilbrogan	Bandon
Farranalough	1,262	Kinalmeaky	Murragh	Bandon
Farranhavane	496	Kinalmeaky	Templemartin	Bandon
Farranthomas	546	Kinalmeaky	Murragh	Bandon
Finnis	642	Kinalmeaky	Brinny	Bandon
Gaggan	599	Kinalmeaky	Ballymodan	Bandon
Garranes	1,215	Kinalmeaky	Templemartin	Bandon
Gully	228	Kinalmeaky	Ballymodan	Bandon
Gurteen	256	Kinalmeaky	Ballymodan	Bandon
Gurteen	578	Kinalmeaky	Kilbrogan	Bandon
Kilbarry	275	Kinalmeaky	Templemartin	Bandon
Kilbeg North	216	Kinalmeaky	Kilbrogan	Bandon
Kilbeg South	182	Kinalmeaky	Kilbrogan	Bandon
Kilbrogan	371	Kinalmeaky	Kilbrogan	Bandon
Kilcolman	556	Kinalmeaky	Desertserges	Bandon
Kilcolmanpark	244	Kinalmeaky	Desertserges	Bandon
Killaneer	405	Kinalmeaky	Murragh	Bandon
Killountain	483	Kinalmeaky	Ballymodan	Bandon
Killowen	507	Kinalmeaky	Killowen	Bandon
Kilmore	692	Kinalmeaky	Brinny	Bandon
Kilnagnady	712	Kinalmeaky	Brinny	Bandon
Kilpatrick	1,103	Kinalmeaky	Brinny	Bandon
Knockadooma	264	Kinalmeaky	Templemartin	Bandon
Knockaveale	563	Kinalmeaky	Ballymodan	Bandon
Knockbrogan	232	Kinalmeaky	Kilbrogan	Bandon
Knocknagallagh	886	Kinalmeaky	Desertserges	Bandon
Knocknagarrane	461	Kinalmeaky	Ballymodan	Bandon
Laragh	609	Kinalmeaky	Kilbrogan	Bandon
Lisnabanree	227	Kinalmeaky	Kilbrogan	Bandon
Lisnagat	395	Kinalmeaky	Templemartin	Bandon
Littlesilver	177	Kinalmeaky	Kilbrogan	Bandon
Mallowgaton	327	Kinalmeaky	Kilbrogan	Bandon
Mawbeg East	222	Kinalmeaky	Killowen	Bandon
Mawbeg West	110	Kinalmeaky	Killowen	Bandon
Mawmore East	208	Kinalmeaky	Killowen	Bandon
Mawmore West	215	Kinalmeaky	Killowen	Bandon
Meelon	428	Kinalmeaky	Ballymodan	Bandon
Mishells	604	Kinalmeaky	Kilbrogan	Bandon
Moneen	101	Kinalmeaky	Brinny	Bandon
Moneen	589	Kinalmeaky	Templemartin	Bandon
Moneens	259	Kinalmeaky	Desertserges	Bandon
Mos-grove	789	Kinalmeaky	Templemartin	Bandon
Moskeagh	652	Kinalmeaky	Templemartin	Bandon
Newcestown	666	Kinalmeaky	Murragh	Bandon
Roughgrove East	400	Kinalmeaky	Kilbrogan	Bandon
Roughgrove West	375	Kinalmeaky	Kilbrogan	Bandon
**Roundhill**	Town	Kinalmeaky	Ballymodan	Bandon
Roundhill	126	Kinalmeaky	Ballymodan	Bandon
Scarriff	327	Kinalmeaky	Templemartin	Bandon
Scartnamuck	550	Kinalmeaky	Templemartin	Bandon
Shanacloyne	355	Kinalmeaky	Templemartin	Bandon
Shinagh	471	Kinalmeaky	Kilbrogan	Bandon
Tullyglass	218	Kinalmeaky	Kilbrogan	Bandon
Tullyglass	872	Kinalmeaky	Murragh	Bandon
