= Ballinard, Tullagh =

Townland in County Cork, Ireland

Coordinates: 51.489°N 9.321°W

Ballinard (Irish: Baile An Aird, meaning 'townland of the height') is a small townland in the civil parish of Tullagh, County Cork, Ireland. The townland is approximately 0.9 square kilometres (0.35 sq mi) in area, and had a population of 9 people as of the 2011 census.
