= Courceys =

Barony in County Cork, Ireland

Coordinates: 51.663°N 8.576°W

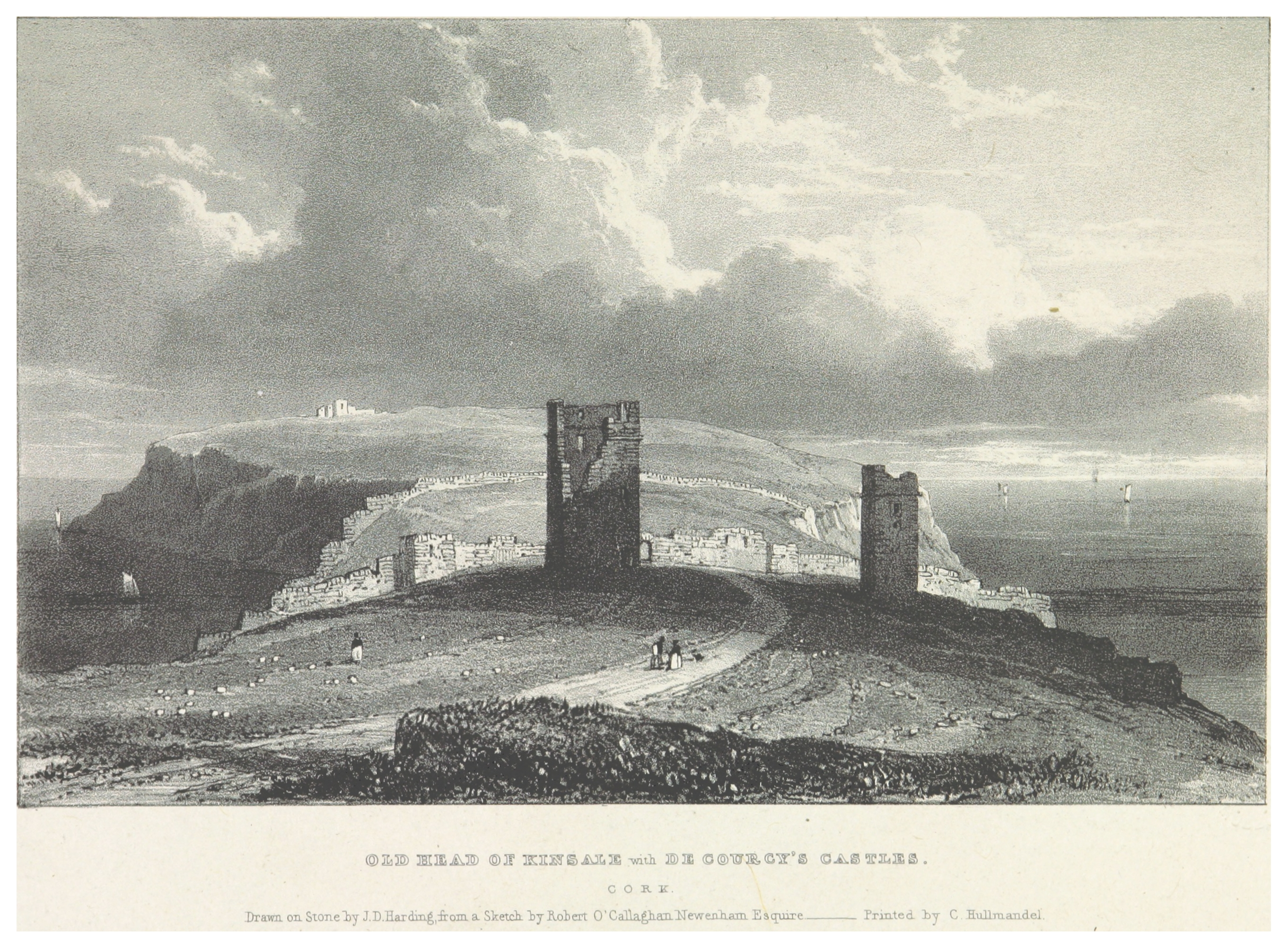
19th century engraving of a former De Courcy castle on the Old Head of Kinsale

Courceys (Irish: Cúrsaigh) is a historical barony in County Cork on the south coast of Ireland. Its name refers to the Norman de Courcy family, Barons Kingsale, who came to Ireland in the 12th century and were the main landowners in the area. The barony of Courceys includes the civil parishes of Kilroan, Ringrone and Templetrine. Courceys is also the name of an ecclesiastical parish in the Roman Catholic Diocese of Cork and Ross. Villages within this parish include Ballinspittle and Ballinadee.

The local Gaelic Athletic Association team is Courcey Rovers GAA. An association football (soccer) team, De Courcey Albion FC, closed in 2016.

== See also ==
- John de Courcy
- List of townlands of the barony of Courceys in County Cork
