= List of townlands of the barony of East Carbery (East Division) =

This is a sortable table of the townlands in the barony of East Carbery (E.D.), County Cork, Ireland. Duplicate names occur where there is more than one townland with the same name in the barony, and also where a townland is known by two alternative names. Names marked in bold typeface are towns and villages, and the word Town appears for those entries in the area column.

== Townland list ==
| Townland | Area (acres) | Barony | Civil parish | Poor law union |
|---|---|---|---|---|
| Aghyohil Beg | 94 | East Carbery (E.D.) | Desertserges | Bandon |
| Aghyohil More | 178 | East Carbery (E.D.) | Desertserges | Bandon |
| Ahalisky | 886 | East Carbery (E.D.) | Kilmaloda | Clonakilty |
| Ardacrow | 519 | East Carbery (E.D.) | Rathclarin | Bandon |
| Ardea | 295 | East Carbery (E.D.) | Ballymoney | Dunmanway |
| Ardkitt East | 283 | East Carbery (E.D.) | Desertserges | Bandon |
| Ardkitt West | 407 | East Carbery (E.D.) | Desertserges | Bandon |
| Ardnaclug | 202 | East Carbery (E.D.) | Inishannon | Bandon |
| Artiteige | 337 | East Carbery (E.D.) | Templetrine | Kinsale |
| **Ballinadee** | Town | East Carbery (E.D.) | Ballinadee | Bandon |
| Ballinadee | 329 | East Carbery (E.D.) | Ballinadee | Bandon |
| Ballinard | 589 | East Carbery (E.D.) | Desertserges | Clonakilty |
| **Ballinascarty** | Town | East Carbery (E.D.) | Kilmaloda | Clonakilty |
| Ballinoroher | 757 | East Carbery (E.D.) | Templequinlan | Clonakilty |
| Ballinrougher | 121 | East Carbery (E.D.) | Kilnagross | Clonakilty |
| Ballinvronig | 319 | East Carbery (E.D.) | Templetrine | Kinsale |
| Bally More | 418 | East Carbery (E.D.) | Kilbrittain | Bandon |
| Ballybeg | 261 | East Carbery (E.D.) | Kilbrittain | Bandon |
| Ballycatteen | 338 | East Carbery (E.D.) | Rathclarin | Bandon |
| Ballydownis | 73 | East Carbery (E.D.) | Ringrone | Kinsale |
| Ballydownis East | 42 | East Carbery (E.D.) | Templetrine | Kinsale |
| Ballydownis West | 60 | East Carbery (E.D.) | Templetrine | Kinsale |
| Ballylangley | 288 | East Carbery (E.D.) | Ballymodan | Bandon |
| Ballymacowen | 522 | East Carbery (E.D.) | Kilnagross | Clonakilty |
| Ballymountain | 533 | East Carbery (E.D.) | Inishannon | Bandon |
| Ballynacarriga | 124 | East Carbery (E.D.) | Ballymoney | Dunmanway |
| Ballynascubbig | 272 | East Carbery (E.D.) | Templetrine | Kinsale |
| **Ballyneen** | Town | East Carbery (E.D.) | Ballymoney | Dunmanway |
| Ballyvoige | 278 | East Carbery (E.D.) | Desertserges | Clonakilty |
| Ballyvolane | 333 | East Carbery (E.D.) | Ballinadee | Bandon |
| Baltinakin | 333 | East Carbery (E.D.) | Kilbrittain | Bandon |
| **Bandon** | Town | East Carbery (E.D.) | Ballymodan | Bandon |
| Barleyfield | 795 | East Carbery (E.D.) | Rathclarin | Bandon |
| Baurleigh | 885 | East Carbery (E.D.) | Kilbrittain | Bandon |
| Bawnea | 112 | East Carbery (E.D.) | Templetrine | Kinsale |
| Bawnea | 355 | East Carbery (E.D.) | Ringrone | Kinsale |
| Beanhill North | 108 | East Carbery (E.D.) | Kilnagross | Clonakilty |
| Beanhill South | 134 | East Carbery (E.D.) | Kilnagross | Clonakilty |
| Boulteen | 212 | East Carbery (E.D.) | Desertserges | Bandon |
| Breaghna | 333 | East Carbery (E.D.) | Desertserges | Bandon |
| Buddrimeen | 227 | East Carbery (E.D.) | Ballymoney | Dunmanway |
| Bunanumera | 232 | East Carbery (E.D.) | Ballymoney | Dunmanway |
| Burrane | 410 | East Carbery (E.D.) | Kilmaloda | Clonakilty |
| Burren | 639 | East Carbery (E.D.) | Rathclarin | Bandon |
| Cappeen | 36 | East Carbery (E.D.) | Kilgarriff | Clonakilty |
| Carhoogarriff | 281 | East Carbery (E.D.) | Kilnagross | Clonakilty |
| Carhoovauler | 561 | East Carbery (E.D.) | Desertserges | Clonakilty |
| Carrig | 165 | East Carbery (E.D.) | Templequinlan | Clonakilty |
| Carrig | 410 | East Carbery (E.D.) | Kilmaloda | Clonakilty |
| Carriganookery | 94 | East Carbery (E.D.) | Kilnagross | Clonakilty |
| Carrigcannon | 122 | East Carbery (E.D.) | Ringrone | Kinsale |
| Carrigcannon | 59 | East Carbery (E.D.) | Ballymodan | Bandon |
| Carrigeen | 210 | East Carbery (E.D.) | Ballymoney | Dunmanway |
| Carrigroe | 276 | East Carbery (E.D.) | Desertserges | Bandon |
| Cashelisky | 368 | East Carbery (E.D.) | Island | Clonakilty |
| Castlederry | 148 | East Carbery (E.D.) | Desertserges | Clonakilty |
| Clashafree | 477 | East Carbery (E.D.) | Ballymodan | Bandon |
| Clashreagh | 132 | East Carbery (E.D.) | Templetrine | Kinsale |
| Clogagh North | 173 | East Carbery (E.D.) | Kilmaloda | Clonakilty |
| Clogagh South | 282 | East Carbery (E.D.) | Kilmaloda | Clonakilty |
| Cloghane | 488 | East Carbery (E.D.) | Ballinadee | Bandon |
| Clogheenavodig | 70 | East Carbery (E.D.) | Ballymodan | Bandon |
| Cloghmacsimon | 258 | East Carbery (E.D.) | Ballymodan | Bandon |
| Cloheen | 360 | East Carbery (E.D.) | Kilgarriff | Clonakilty |
| Cloheen | 80 | East Carbery (E.D.) | Island | Clonakilty |
| **Clonakilty** | Town | East Carbery (E.D.) | Kilgarriff | Clonakilty |
| Clonbouig | 209 | East Carbery (E.D.) | Templetrine | Kinsale |
| Clonbouig | 219 | East Carbery (E.D.) | Ringrone | Kinsale |
| Cloncouse | 241 | East Carbery (E.D.) | Ballinadee | Bandon |
| Clooncalla Beg | 219 | East Carbery (E.D.) | Rathclarin | Bandon |
| Clooncalla More | 543 | East Carbery (E.D.) | Rathclarin | Bandon |
| Cloonderreen | 291 | East Carbery (E.D.) | Rathclarin | Bandon |
| Coolmain | 450 | East Carbery (E.D.) | Ringrone | Kinsale |
| Corravreeda East | 258 | East Carbery (E.D.) | Ballymodan | Bandon |
| Corravreeda West | 169 | East Carbery (E.D.) | Ballymodan | Bandon |
| Cripplehill | 125 | East Carbery (E.D.) | Ballymodan | Bandon |
| Cripplehill | 93 | East Carbery (E.D.) | Kilbrittain | Bandon |
| Crohane | 91 | East Carbery (E.D.) | Kilnagross | Clonakilty |
| Crohane East | 108 | East Carbery (E.D.) | Desertserges | Clonakilty |
| Crohane West | 69 | East Carbery (E.D.) | Desertserges | Clonakilty |
| Crohane (or Bandon) | 204 | East Carbery (E.D.) | Desertserges | Clonakilty |
| Crohane (or Bandon) | 250 | East Carbery (E.D.) | Kilnagross | Clonakilty |
| Currabeg | 173 | East Carbery (E.D.) | Ballymoney | Dunmanway |
| Curraghcrowly East | 327 | East Carbery (E.D.) | Ballymoney | Dunmanway |
| Curraghcrowly West | 242 | East Carbery (E.D.) | Ballymoney | Dunmanway |
| Curraghgrane More | 110 | East Carbery (E.D.) | Desert | Clonakilty |
| Currane | 156 | East Carbery (E.D.) | Desertserges | Clonakilty |
| Curranure | 362 | East Carbery (E.D.) | Inishannon | Bandon |
| Currarane | 100 | East Carbery (E.D.) | Templetrine | Kinsale |
| Currarane | 271 | East Carbery (E.D.) | Ringrone | Kinsale |
| Derrigra | 177 | East Carbery (E.D.) | Ballymoney | Dunmanway |
| Derrigra West | 320 | East Carbery (E.D.) | Ballymoney | Dunmanway |
| Derry | 140 | East Carbery (E.D.) | Desertserges | Clonakilty |
| Derrymeeleen | 441 | East Carbery (E.D.) | Desertserges | Clonakilty |
| Desert | 339 | East Carbery (E.D.) | Desert | Clonakilty |
| Drombofinny | 86 | East Carbery (E.D.) | Desertserges | Bandon |
| Dromgarriff | 335 | East Carbery (E.D.) | Kilmaloda | Clonakilty |
| Dromgarriff East | 385 | East Carbery (E.D.) | Kilnagross | Clonakilty |
| Dromgarriff West | 138 | East Carbery (E.D.) | Kilnagross | Clonakilty |
| Dromkeen | 673 | East Carbery (E.D.) | Inishannon | Bandon |
| Edencurra | 516 | East Carbery (E.D.) | Ballymoney | Dunmanway |
| Farran | 502 | East Carbery (E.D.) | Kilmaloda | Clonakilty |
| Farranagow | 99 | East Carbery (E.D.) | Inishannon | Bandon |
| Farrannagark | 290 | East Carbery (E.D.) | Rathclarin | Bandon |
| Farrannasheshery | 304 | East Carbery (E.D.) | Desertserges | Bandon |
| Fourcuil | 125 | East Carbery (E.D.) | Kilgarriff | Clonakilty |
| Fourcuil | 244 | East Carbery (E.D.) | Templebryan | Clonakilty |
| Garranbeg | 170 | East Carbery (E.D.) | Ballymodan | Bandon |
| Garraneanasig | 270 | East Carbery (E.D.) | Ringrone | Kinsale |
| Garraneard | 276 | East Carbery (E.D.) | Kilnagross | Clonakilty |
| Garranecore | 144 | East Carbery (E.D.) | Templebryan | Clonakilty |
| Garranecore | 186 | East Carbery (E.D.) | Kilgarriff | Clonakilty |
| Garranefeen | 478 | East Carbery (E.D.) | Rathclarin | Bandon |
| Garraneishal | 121 | East Carbery (E.D.) | Kilnagross | Clonakilty |
| Garranelahan | 126 | East Carbery (E.D.) | Desertserges | Bandon |
| Garranereagh | 398 | East Carbery (E.D.) | Ringrone | Kinsale |
| Garranes | 416 | East Carbery (E.D.) | Desertserges | Clonakilty |
| Garranure | 436 | East Carbery (E.D.) | Ballymoney | Dunmanway |
| Garryndruig | 856 | East Carbery (E.D.) | Rathclarin | Bandon |
| Glan | 194 | East Carbery (E.D.) | Ballymoney | Dunmanway |
| Glanavaud | 98 | East Carbery (E.D.) | Ringrone | Kinsale |
| Glanavirane | 107 | East Carbery (E.D.) | Templetrine | Kinsale |
| Glanavirane | 91 | East Carbery (E.D.) | Ringrone | Kinsale |
| Glanduff | 464 | East Carbery (E.D.) | Rathclarin | Bandon |
| Grillagh | 136 | East Carbery (E.D.) | Kilnagross | Clonakilty |
| Grillagh | 316 | East Carbery (E.D.) | Ballymoney | Dunmanway |
| Hacketstown | 182 | East Carbery (E.D.) | Templetrine | Kinsale |
| Inchafune | 871 | East Carbery (E.D.) | Ballymoney | Dunmanway |
| Inchydoney Island | 474 | East Carbery (E.D.) | Island | Clonakilty |
| Kilbeloge | 216 | East Carbery (E.D.) | Desertserges | Clonakilty |
| Kilbree | 284 | East Carbery (E.D.) | Island | Clonakilty |
| **Kilbrittain** | Town | East Carbery (E.D.) | Rathclarin | Bandon |
| Kilbrittain | 483 | East Carbery (E.D.) | Kilbrittain | Bandon |
| Kilcaskan | 221 | East Carbery (E.D.) | Ballymoney | Dunmanway |
| Kildarra | 463 | East Carbery (E.D.) | Ballinadee | Bandon |
| Kilgarriff | 835 | East Carbery (E.D.) | Kilgarriff | Clonakilty |
| Kilgobbin | 1,263 | East Carbery (E.D.) | Ballinadee | Bandon |
| Kill North | 136 | East Carbery (E.D.) | Desertserges | Clonakilty |
| Kill South | 139 | East Carbery (E.D.) | Desertserges | Clonakilty |
| Killanamaul | 220 | East Carbery (E.D.) | Kilbrittain | Bandon |
| Killaneetig | 342 | East Carbery (E.D.) | Ballinadee | Bandon |
| Killavarrig | 708 | East Carbery (E.D.) | Timoleague | Clonakilty |
| Killeen | 309 | East Carbery (E.D.) | Desertserges | Clonakilty |
| Killeens | 132 | East Carbery (E.D.) | Templetrine | Kinsale |
| Kilmacsimon | 219 | East Carbery (E.D.) | Ballinadee | Bandon |
| Kilmaloda | 634 | East Carbery (E.D.) | Kilmaloda | Clonakilty |
| Kilmoylerane North | 306 | East Carbery (E.D.) | Desertserges | Clonakilty |
| Kilmoylerane South | 324 | East Carbery (E.D.) | Desertserges | Clonakilty |
| Kilnameela | 397 | East Carbery (E.D.) | Desertserges | Bandon |
| Kilrush | 189 | East Carbery (E.D.) | Desertserges | Bandon |
| Kilshinahan | 528 | East Carbery (E.D.) | Kilbrittain | Bandon |
| Kilvinane | 199 | East Carbery (E.D.) | Ballymoney | Dunmanway |
| Kilvurra | 356 | East Carbery (E.D.) | Ballymoney | Dunmanway |
| Knockacullen | 381 | East Carbery (E.D.) | Desertserges | Clonakilty |
| Knockaneady | 393 | East Carbery (E.D.) | Ballymoney | Dunmanway |
| Knockaneroe | 127 | East Carbery (E.D.) | Templetrine | Kinsale |
| Knockanreagh | 139 | East Carbery (E.D.) | Ballymodan | Bandon |
| Knockbrown | 312 | East Carbery (E.D.) | Kilbrittain | Bandon |
| Knockbrown | 510 | East Carbery (E.D.) | Kilmaloda | Bandon |
| Knockeenbwee Lower | 213 | East Carbery (E.D.) | Dromdaleague | Skibbereen |
| Knockeenbwee Upper | 229 | East Carbery (E.D.) | Dromdaleague | Skibbereen |
| Knockeencon | 108 | East Carbery (E.D.) | Tullagh | Skibbereen |
| Knockmacool | 241 | East Carbery (E.D.) | Desertserges | Bandon |
| Knocknacurra | 422 | East Carbery (E.D.) | Ballinadee | Bandon |
| Knocknagappul | 507 | East Carbery (E.D.) | Ballinadee | Bandon |
| Knocknanuss | 394 | East Carbery (E.D.) | Desertserges | Clonakilty |
| Knocknastooka | 118 | East Carbery (E.D.) | Desertserges | Bandon |
| Knockroe | 601 | East Carbery (E.D.) | Inishannon | Bandon |
| Knocks | 540 | East Carbery (E.D.) | Desertserges | Clonakilty |
| Knockskagh | 489 | East Carbery (E.D.) | Kilgarriff | Clonakilty |
| Knoppoge | 567 | East Carbery (E.D.) | Kilbrittain | Bandon |
| Lackanalooha | 209 | East Carbery (E.D.) | Kilnagross | Clonakilty |
| Lackenagobidane | 48 | East Carbery (E.D.) | Island | Clonakilty |
| Lisbehegh | 255 | East Carbery (E.D.) | Desertserges | Clonakilty |
| Lisheen | 44 | East Carbery (E.D.) | Templetrine | Kinsale |
| Lisheenaleen | 267 | East Carbery (E.D.) | Rathclarin | Bandon |
| Lisnacunna | 529 | East Carbery (E.D.) | Desertserges | Bandon |
| Lisroe | 91 | East Carbery (E.D.) | Kilgarriff | Clonakilty |
| Lissaphooca | 513 | East Carbery (E.D.) | Ballymodan | Bandon |
| Lisselane | 429 | East Carbery (E.D.) | Kilnagross | Clonakilty |
| Madame | 273 | East Carbery (E.D.) | Kilmaloda | Clonakilty |
| Madame | 41 | East Carbery (E.D.) | Kilnagross | Clonakilty |
| Maulbrack East | 100 | East Carbery (E.D.) | Desertserges | Bandon |
| Maulbrack West | 242 | East Carbery (E.D.) | Desertserges | Bandon |
| Maulmane | 219 | East Carbery (E.D.) | Kilbrittain | Bandon |
| Maulnageragh | 135 | East Carbery (E.D.) | Kilnagross | Clonakilty |
| Maulnarouga North | 81 | East Carbery (E.D.) | Desertserges | Bandon |
| Maulnarouga South | 374 | East Carbery (E.D.) | Desertserges | Bandon |
| Maulnaskehy | 14 | East Carbery (E.D.) | Kilgarriff | Clonakilty |
| Maulrour | 244 | East Carbery (E.D.) | Desertserges | Clonakilty |
| Maulrour | 340 | East Carbery (E.D.) | Kilmaloda | Clonakilty |
| Maulskinlahane | 245 | East Carbery (E.D.) | Kilbrittain | Bandon |
| Miles | 268 | East Carbery (E.D.) | Kilgarriff | Clonakilty |
| Moanarone | 235 | East Carbery (E.D.) | Ballymodan | Bandon |
| Monteen | 589 | East Carbery (E.D.) | Kilmaloda | Clonakilty |
| Phale Lower | 287 | East Carbery (E.D.) | Ballymoney | Dunmanway |
| Phale Upper | 234 | East Carbery (E.D.) | Ballymoney | Dunmanway |
| Ratharoon East | 810 | East Carbery (E.D.) | Ballinadee | Bandon |
| Ratharoon West | 383 | East Carbery (E.D.) | Ballinadee | Bandon |
| Rathdrought | 1,242 | East Carbery (E.D.) | Ballinadee | Bandon |
| Reengarrigeen | 560 | East Carbery (E.D.) | Kilmaloda | Clonakilty |
| Reenroe | 123 | East Carbery (E.D.) | Kilgarriff | Clonakilty |
| Rochestown | 104 | East Carbery (E.D.) | Templetrine | Kinsale |
| Rockfort | 308 | East Carbery (E.D.) | Brinny | Bandon |
| Rockhouse | 82 | East Carbery (E.D.) | Ballinadee | Bandon |
| Scartagh | 186 | East Carbery (E.D.) | Kilgarriff | Clonakilty |
| Shanakill | 197 | East Carbery (E.D.) | Rathclarin | Bandon |
| Shanaway East | 386 | East Carbery (E.D.) | Ballymoney | Dunmanway |
| Shanaway Middle | 296 | East Carbery (E.D.) | Ballymoney | Dunmanway |
| Shanaway West | 266 | East Carbery (E.D.) | Ballymoney | Dunmanway |
| Skeaf | 452 | East Carbery (E.D.) | Kilmaloda | Clonakilty |
| Skeaf East | 371 | East Carbery (E.D.) | Kilmaloda | Clonakilty |
| Skeaf West | 477 | East Carbery (E.D.) | Kilmaloda | Clonakilty |
| Skevanish | 359 | East Carbery (E.D.) | Inishannon | Bandon |
| Steilaneigh | 42 | East Carbery (E.D.) | Templetrine | Kinsale |
| Tawnies Lower | 238 | East Carbery (E.D.) | Kilgarriff | Clonakilty |
| Tawnies Upper | 321 | East Carbery (E.D.) | Kilgarriff | Clonakilty |
| Templebryan North | 436 | East Carbery (E.D.) | Templebryan | Clonakilty |
| Templebryan South | 363 | East Carbery (E.D.) | Templebryan | Clonakilty |
| Tullig | 135 | East Carbery (E.D.) | Kilmaloda | Clonakilty |
| Tullyland | 348 | East Carbery (E.D.) | Ballymodan | Bandon |
| Tullyland | 506 | East Carbery (E.D.) | Ballinadee | Bandon |
| Tullymurrihy | 665 | East Carbery (E.D.) | Desertserges | Bandon |
| Youghals | 109 | East Carbery (E.D.) | Island | Clonakilty |
| Youghals | 177 | East Carbery (E.D.) | Kilgarriff | Clonakilty |
