= List of townlands of the barony of West Carbery (West Division) =

This is a sortable table of the townlands in the barony of West Carbery (W.D.), County Cork, Ireland. Duplicate names occur where there is more than one townland with the same name in the barony, and also where a townland is known by two alternative names. Names marked in bold typeface are towns and villages, and the word Town appears for those entries in the area column.

== Townland list ==
Townland	Area (acres)	Barony	Civil parish	Poor law union
Aghagooheen	268	West Carbery (W.D.)	Kilmocomoge	Bantry
Aghaville	515	West Carbery (W.D.)	Caheragh	Skibbereen
Altar	295	West Carbery (W.D.)	Kilmoe	Skull
Ardahill	183	West Carbery (W.D.)	Kilcrohane	Bantry
Ardanenig	137	West Carbery (W.D.)	Kilcrohane	Bantry
Arderrawinny	702	West Carbery (W.D.)	Skull	Skull
Ardintenant	117	West Carbery (W.D.)	Skull	Skull
Ardmanagh	757	West Carbery (W.D.)	Skull	Skull
Ardrah	451	West Carbery (W.D.)	Kilmocomoge	Bantry
Ardura Beg	233	West Carbery (W.D.)	Kilcoe	Skull
Ardura More	311	West Carbery (W.D.)	Kilcoe	Skull
Arduslough	55	West Carbery (W.D.)	Kilmoe	Skull
Aughaleigue Beg	275	West Carbery (W.D.)	Kilcrohane	Bantry
Aughaleigue More	285	West Carbery (W.D.)	Kilcrohane	Bantry
Ballaghadown North	235	West Carbery (W.D.)	Caheragh	Skibbereen
Ballaghadown South	221	West Carbery (W.D.)	Caheragh	Skibbereen
Ballybane East	847	West Carbery (W.D.)	Skull	Skull
Ballybane West	610	West Carbery (W.D.)	Skull	Skull
Ballybrack	121	West Carbery (W.D.)	Skull	Skull
Ballycommane	1,349	West Carbery (W.D.)	Durrus	Bantry
Ballycummisk	191	West Carbery (W.D.)	Skull	Skull
**Ballydehob**	Town	West Carbery (W.D.)	Skull	Skull
Ballydehob	188	West Carbery (W.D.)	Skull	Skull
Ballydivlin	649	West Carbery (W.D.)	Kilmoe	Skull
Ballyieragh	578	West Carbery (W.D.)	Kilcrohane	Bantry
Ballynatra	39	West Carbery (W.D.)	Kilcrohane	Bantry
Ballynaule	91	West Carbery (W.D.)	Kilmoe	Skull
Ballyourane	535	West Carbery (W.D.)	Caheragh	Skibbereen
Ballyrisode	591	West Carbery (W.D.)	Kilmoe	Skull
Ballyroon	115	West Carbery (W.D.)	Kilcrohane	Bantry
Ballyroon Mountain	466	West Carbery (W.D.)	Kilcrohane	Bantry
Ballyvoge Beg	100	West Carbery (W.D.)	Kilmoe	Skull
Ballyvoge More	240	West Carbery (W.D.)	Kilmoe	Skull
Ballyvonane	235	West Carbery (W.D.)	Skull	Skull
Balteen	101	West Carbery (W.D.)	Skull	Skull
Balteen	605	West Carbery (W.D.)	Kilmoe	Skull
Barna	302	West Carbery (W.D.)	Caheragh	Skibbereen
Barnatonicane	261	West Carbery (W.D.)	Skull	Skull
Barryroe	685	West Carbery (W.D.)	Skull	Skull
Bauravilla	579	West Carbery (W.D.)	Caheragh	Skibbereen
Baurgorm	613	West Carbery (W.D.)	Kilmocomoge	Bantry
Bawnaknockane	297	West Carbery (W.D.)	Skull	Skull
Bawnboy	257	West Carbery (W.D.)	Caheragh	Skibbereen
Bawnishal	365	West Carbery (W.D.)	Caheragh	Skibbereen
Bawnshanaclogh	194	West Carbery (W.D.)	Skull	Skull
Beakeen	99	West Carbery (W.D.)	Skull	Skull
Bird Island	2	West Carbery (W.D.)	Kilmoe	Skull
Boleagh	252	West Carbery (W.D.)	Kilcoe	Skull
Boulysallagh	252	West Carbery (W.D.)	Kilmoe	Skull
Brahalish	782	West Carbery (W.D.)	Durrus	Bantry
Bunalunn	435	West Carbery (W.D.)	Caheragh	Skibbereen
Caher	253	West Carbery (W.D.)	Kilcrohane	Bantry
Caher	465	West Carbery (W.D.)	Kilmoe	Skull
Caheragh	664	West Carbery (W.D.)	Caheragh	Skibbereen
Caheravirane	137	West Carbery (W.D.)	Skull	Skull
Cahergal	121	West Carbery (W.D.)	Kilcrohane	Bantry
Caherlusky	153	West Carbery (W.D.)	Skull	Skull
Caher-mountain	221	West Carbery (W.D.)	Kilcrohane	Bantry
Caherogullane	292	West Carbery (W.D.)	Kilmocomoge	Bantry
Caherolickane	240	West Carbery (W.D.)	Skull	Skull
Caherurlagh	30	West Carbery (W.D.)	Kilcrohane	Bantry
Caherurlagh Mountain North	27	West Carbery (W.D.)	Kilcrohane	Bantry
Caherurlagh Mountain South	23	West Carbery (W.D.)	Kilcrohane	Bantry
Calf Island West	62	West Carbery (W.D.)	Skull	Skull
Callaros Eighter	169	West Carbery (W.D.)	Kilmoe	Skull
Callaros Oughter	500	West Carbery (W.D.)	Kilmoe	Skull
Cannawee	113	West Carbery (W.D.)	Kilmoe	Skull
Cappagh Beg	474	West Carbery (W.D.)	Skull	Skull
Cappagh More	382	West Carbery (W.D.)	Skull	Skull
Cappaghglass	426	West Carbery (W.D.)	Skull	Skull
Cappaghnacallee	228	West Carbery (W.D.)	Skull	Skull
Carbery Island	26	West Carbery (W.D.)	Skull	Skull
Carravilleen	242	West Carbery (W.D.)	Kilcrohane	Bantry
Carrig	97	West Carbery (W.D.)	Caheragh	Skibbereen
Carrigacat & Milleen	838	West Carbery (W.D.)	Kilmoe	Skull
Carrigacurriheen	234	West Carbery (W.D.)	Kilmoe	Skull
Carrigboy	116	West Carbery (W.D.)	Durrus	Bantry
Carrigeengour	132	West Carbery (W.D.)	Kilmoe	Skull
Carrigmanus	78	West Carbery (W.D.)	Kilmoe	Skull
Carthy's Island	7	West Carbery (W.D.)	Skull	Skull
Cashelfean	1,005	West Carbery (W.D.)	Skull	Skull
Castle Island	121	West Carbery (W.D.)	Skull	Skull
Castlemehigan	118	West Carbery (W.D.)	Kilmoe	Skull
Castlepoint	85	West Carbery (W.D.)	Skull	Skull
Clash	96	West Carbery (W.D.)	Kilcrohane	Bantry
Clashadoo	746	West Carbery (W.D.)	Durrus	Bantry
Clashmore	228	West Carbery (W.D.)	Skull	Skull
Cloghanaculleen	629	West Carbery (W.D.)	Kilmoe	Skull
Cloghanalehid	113	West Carbery (W.D.)	Kilmoe	Skull
Cloghane	392	West Carbery (W.D.)	Kilmoe	Skull
Cloghane Beg	134	West Carbery (W.D.)	Caheragh	Skibbereen
Cloghane More	132	West Carbery (W.D.)	Caheragh	Skibbereen
Clogher	33	West Carbery (W.D.)	Kilmoe	Skull
Clooncugger	758	West Carbery (W.D.)	Caheragh	Skibbereen
Cloonee	296	West Carbery (W.D.)	Kilmocomoge	Bantry
Cloonee	467	West Carbery (W.D.)	Durrus	Bantry
Coarliss	291	West Carbery (W.D.)	Caheragh	Skibbereen
Colla	206	West Carbery (W.D.)	Skull	Skull
Coney Island	6	West Carbery (W.D.)	Skull	Skull
Coolagh Beg	161	West Carbery (W.D.)	Skull	Skull
Coolagh More	245	West Carbery (W.D.)	Skull	Skull
Coolbane	520	West Carbery (W.D.)	Caheragh	Skibbereen
Coolboy	522	West Carbery (W.D.)	Caheragh	Skibbereen
Coolcaha	257	West Carbery (W.D.)	Skull	Skull
Coolcoulaghta	1,145	West Carbery (W.D.)	Durrus	Bantry
Coolnaclehy	285	West Carbery (W.D.)	Caheragh	Skibbereen
Coolnagarrane	285	West Carbery (W.D.)	Abbeystrowry	Skibbereen
Coomfarna	284	West Carbery (W.D.)	Skull	Skull
Coomkeen	914	West Carbery (W.D.)	Durrus	Bantry
Cooradarrigan	283	West Carbery (W.D.)	Skull	Skull
Cooradowney	163	West Carbery (W.D.)	Caheragh	Skibbereen
Cooragannive	347	West Carbery (W.D.)	Caheragh	Skibbereen
Cooragurteen	291	West Carbery (W.D.)	Skull	Skull
Cooranuller	729	West Carbery (W.D.)	Inchigeelagh	Skibbereen
Coorlacka	309	West Carbery (W.D.)	Kilmoe	Skull
Coosane	270	West Carbery (W.D.)	Skull	Skull
Cooscroneen	121	West Carbery (W.D.)	Myross	Skibbereen
Coosheen	329	West Carbery (W.D.)	Skull	Skull
Corran Beg	162	West Carbery (W.D.)	Kilmoe	Skull
Corran More	172	West Carbery (W.D.)	Kilmoe	Skull
Corravoley	341	West Carbery (W.D.)	Kilcoe	Skull
Cove	283	West Carbery (W.D.)	Skull	Skull
Croagh	167	West Carbery (W.D.)	Skull	Skull
Crookhaven	252	West Carbery (W.D.)	Kilmoe	Skull
Crottees	489	West Carbery (W.D.)	Durrus	Bantry
Cullomane East	755	West Carbery (W.D.)	Caheragh	Skibbereen
Cullomane West	364	West Carbery (W.D.)	Caheragh	Skibbereen
Cusovinna	190	West Carbery (W.D.)	Skull	Skull
Derreenard	294	West Carbery (W.D.)	Skull	Skull
Derreenavarrihy	282	West Carbery (W.D.)	Caheragh	Skibbereen
Derreengranagh	273	West Carbery (W.D.)	Kilmocomoge	Bantry
Derreennalomane	943	West Carbery (W.D.)	Skull	Skull
Derreennatra	497	West Carbery (W.D.)	Skull	Skull
Derreeny	306	West Carbery (W.D.)	Caheragh	Skibbereen
Derrycarhoon	445	West Carbery (W.D.)	Skull	Skull
Derrycluvane	371	West Carbery (W.D.)	Kilcrohane	Bantry
Derryconnell	535	West Carbery (W.D.)	Skull	Skull
Derryfunshion	242	West Carbery (W.D.)	Skull	Skull
Derryishal	278	West Carbery (W.D.)	Caheragh	Skibbereen
Derryleary	183	West Carbery (W.D.)	Skull	Skull
Derryvahalla	554	West Carbery (W.D.)	Kilmocomoge	Bantry
Dick's Island	2	West Carbery (W.D.)	Skull	Skull
Dooneen	164	West Carbery (W.D.)	Kilcrohane	Bantry
Doonoure	240	West Carbery (W.D.)	Kilcrohane	Bantry
Dough	244	West Carbery (W.D.)	Kilmoe	Skull
Driminidy North	262	West Carbery (W.D.)	Drinagh	Skibbereen
Driminidy South	548	West Carbery (W.D.)	Drinagh	Skibbereen
Drinane	156	West Carbery (W.D.)	Skull	Skull
Drishane	324	West Carbery (W.D.)	Skull	Skull
Drishane	77	West Carbery (W.D.)	Castlehaven	Skibbereen
Drishanemore	300	West Carbery (W.D.)	Creagh	Skibbereen
Dromataniheen	98	West Carbery (W.D.)	Durrus	Bantry
Dromcorragh	584	West Carbery (W.D.)	Caheragh	Skibbereen
Dromdaleague	557	West Carbery (W.D.)	Dromdaleague	Skibbereen
Dromkeal	171	West Carbery (W.D.)	Skull	Skull
Dromnagapple	135	West Carbery (W.D.)	Kilcrohane	Bantry
Dromnea	371	West Carbery (W.D.)	Kilcrohane	Bantry
Dromore	621	West Carbery (W.D.)	Caheragh	Skibbereen
Dromourneen	1,107	West Carbery (W.D.)	Caheragh	Skibbereen
Dromreagh	841	West Carbery (W.D.)	Durrus	Bantry
Dunbeacon	1,459	West Carbery (W.D.)	Skull	Skull
Dunkelly East	290	West Carbery (W.D.)	Kilmoe	Skull
Dunkelly Middle	124	West Carbery (W.D.)	Kilmoe	Skull
Dunkelly West	380	West Carbery (W.D.)	Kilmoe	Skull
Dunlough	319	West Carbery (W.D.)	Kilmoe	Skull
Dunmanus East	543	West Carbery (W.D.)	Skull	Skull
Dunmanus West	576	West Carbery (W.D.)	Skull	Skull
Enaghoughter East	260	West Carbery (W.D.)	Kilmoe	Skull
Enaghoughter West	166	West Carbery (W.D.)	Kilmoe	Skull
Eskraha	317	West Carbery (W.D.)	Kilcrohane	Bantry
Fahane	144	West Carbery (W.D.)	Kilcrohane	Bantry
Farranamanagh	313	West Carbery (W.D.)	Kilcrohane	Bantry
Fastness Rock	--	West Carbery (W.D.)	Kilmoe	Skull
Faunmore	262	West Carbery (W.D.)	Kilcrohane	Bantry
Foilakilly	361	West Carbery (W.D.)	Kilcrohane	Bantry
Foilnamuck	378	West Carbery (W.D.)	Skull	Skull
Furze Island	15	West Carbery (W.D.)	Skull	Skull
Garrane	969	West Carbery (W.D.)	Caheragh	Skibbereen
Garranes	112	West Carbery (W.D.)	Skull	Skull
Gearhameen	645	West Carbery (W.D.)	Durrus	Bantry
Gerahies	325	West Carbery (W.D.)	Kilcrohane	Bantry
Glan	1,046	West Carbery (W.D.)	Skull	Skull
Glanalin	96	West Carbery (W.D.)	Kilcrohane	Bantry
Glanaphuca	629	West Carbery (W.D.)	Caheragh	Skibbereen
Glanatnaw	690	West Carbery (W.D.)	Caheragh	Skibbereen
Glandarta	471	West Carbery (W.D.)	Caheragh	Skibbereen
Glanlough	1,183	West Carbery (W.D.)	Kilcrohane	Bantry
Glanlough	341	West Carbery (W.D.)	Kilmocomoge	Bantry
Glannakilleenagh	286	West Carbery (W.D.)	Kilcoe	Skull
Glanroon	144	West Carbery (W.D.)	Kilcrohane	Bantry
Glansallagh	137	West Carbery (W.D.)	Skull	Skull
Goat Island	24	West Carbery (W.D.)	Skull	Skull
Goat Island Little	4	West Carbery (W.D.)	Skull	Skull
Goleen	58	West Carbery (W.D.)	Kilmoe	Skull
Gortacloona	169	West Carbery (W.D.)	Kilmocomoge	Bantry
Gortalassa	264	West Carbery (W.D.)	Kilcrohane	Bantry
Gortavallig	296	West Carbery (W.D.)	Kilcrohane	Bantry
Gortbrack	105	West Carbery (W.D.)	Kilmoe	Skull
Gortdromagh	335	West Carbery (W.D.)	Caheragh	Skibbereen
Gortduff	221	West Carbery (W.D.)	Kilmoe	Skull
Gorteanish	345	West Carbery (W.D.)	Kilcrohane	Bantry
Gortnacarriga	273	West Carbery (W.D.)	Kilmoe	Skull
Gortnagashel	80	West Carbery (W.D.)	Kilmoe	Skull
Gortnagrough	455	West Carbery (W.D.)	Skull	Skull
Gortnakilly	478	West Carbery (W.D.)	Kilcrohane	Bantry
Gortnamona	232	West Carbery (W.D.)	Skull	Skull
Gortnascreeny	713	West Carbery (W.D.)	Caheragh	Skibbereen
Gorttyowen	257	West Carbery (W.D.)	Skull	Skull
Gouladoo	288	West Carbery (W.D.)	Kilcrohane	Bantry
Greenane	57	West Carbery (W.D.)	Kilmoe	Skull
Greenmount	355	West Carbery (W.D.)	Kilcoe	Skull
Gubbeen	828	West Carbery (W.D.)	Skull	Skull
Gunpoint	135	West Carbery (W.D.)	Skull	Skull
Gurteennakilla	520	West Carbery (W.D.)	Skull	Skull
Gurteenroe	234	West Carbery (W.D.)	Skull	Skull
Gurteenulla	151	West Carbery (W.D.)	Kilcoe	Skull
Horse Island	154	West Carbery (W.D.)	Skull	Skull
Illaunriemonia	1	West Carbery (W.D.)	Skull	Skull
Illaunroe	6	West Carbery (W.D.)	Skull	Skull
Illaunroemore	15	West Carbery (W.D.)	Kilcoe	Skull
Inchingerig	390	West Carbery (W.D.)	Caheragh	Skibbereen
Inchybegga	264	West Carbery (W.D.)	Caheragh	Skibbereen
Kealanine	779	West Carbery (W.D.)	Caheragh	Skibbereen
Kealfadda	477	West Carbery (W.D.)	Kilmoe	Skull
Kealties	614	West Carbery (W.D.)	Durrus	Bantry
Keilnascarta	317	West Carbery (W.D.)	Kilmocomoge	Bantry
Kilbarry	79	West Carbery (W.D.)	Kilmoe	Skull
Kilbronoge	645	West Carbery (W.D.)	Skull	Skull
Kilbrown	191	West Carbery (W.D.)	Kilmoe	Skull
Kilcoe	586	West Carbery (W.D.)	Kilcoe	Skull
Kilcomane	424	West Carbery (W.D.)	Skull	Skull
Kilcrohane	287	West Carbery (W.D.)	Kilcrohane	Bantry
Killeane	102	West Carbery (W.D.)	Kilmoe	Skull
Killeen North	380	West Carbery (W.D.)	Kilcrohane	Bantry
Killeen South	361	West Carbery (W.D.)	Kilcrohane	Bantry
Killeenleagh	270	West Carbery (W.D.)	Caheragh	Skibbereen
Killoveenoge	398	West Carbery (W.D.)	Durrus	Bantry
Kilnagospagh	346	West Carbery (W.D.)	Caheragh	Skibbereen
Kilpatrick	123	West Carbery (W.D.)	Skull	Skull
Knock	135	West Carbery (W.D.)	Skull	Skull
Knockagallane	118	West Carbery (W.D.)	Kilmoe	Skull
Knockatassonig	94	West Carbery (W.D.)	Kilmoe	Skull
Knockeennagearagh	125	West Carbery (W.D.)	Kilmoe	Skull
Knockeens	225	West Carbery (W.D.)	Skull	Skull
Knockeens	313	West Carbery (W.D.)	Kilcrohane	Bantry
Knockgorm	421	West Carbery (W.D.)	Caheragh	Skibbereen
Knockroe	218	West Carbery (W.D.)	Kilcrohane	Bantry
Knockroe	433	West Carbery (W.D.)	Kilcoe	Skull
Lackareagh	326	West Carbery (W.D.)	Skull	Skull
Lackavaun	222	West Carbery (W.D.)	Kilmoe	Skull
Lackenafasoge	282	West Carbery (W.D.)	Caheragh	Skibbereen
Lackenakea	112	West Carbery (W.D.)	Kilmoe	Skull
Laharan	225	West Carbery (W.D.)	Skull	Skull
Laharandota	67	West Carbery (W.D.)	Kilcrohane	Bantry
Laharandota Mountain	33	West Carbery (W.D.)	Kilcrohane	Bantry
Lassanaroe	374	West Carbery (W.D.)	Caheragh	Skibbereen
Leamcon	136	West Carbery (W.D.)	Skull	Skull
Leenane	95	West Carbery (W.D.)	Kilmoe	Skull
Letter	219	West Carbery (W.D.)	Kilmoe	Skull
Letter	703	West Carbery (W.D.)	Skull	Skull
Letter East	259	West Carbery (W.D.)	Kilcrohane	Bantry
Letter Lower	49	West Carbery (W.D.)	Kilcrohane	Bantry
Letter West	117	West Carbery (W.D.)	Kilcrohane	Bantry
Letterlicky East	320	West Carbery (W.D.)	Kilmocomoge	Bantry
Letterlicky Middle	647	West Carbery (W.D.)	Kilmocomoge	Bantry
Letterlicky West	525	West Carbery (W.D.)	Kilmocomoge	Bantry
Letter-mountain	233	West Carbery (W.D.)	Kilcrohane	Bantry
Lisheenacrehig	196	West Carbery (W.D.)	Kilcoe	Skull
Lisheennacreagh	656	West Carbery (W.D.)	Skull	Skull
Lissacaha (North)	349	West Carbery (W.D.)	Skull	Skull
Lissacaha	779	West Carbery (W.D.)	Skull	Skull
Lissaclarig East	360	West Carbery (W.D.)	Kilcoe	Skull
Lissaclarig West	392	West Carbery (W.D.)	Kilcoe	Skull
Lissagriffin	344	West Carbery (W.D.)	Kilmoe	Skull
Lissangle	443	West Carbery (W.D.)	Caheragh	Skibbereen
Lissydonnell	223	West Carbery (W.D.)	Skull	Skull
Lognagappul	383	West Carbery (W.D.)	Caheragh	Skibbereen
Long Island	341	West Carbery (W.D.)	Skull	Skull
Lowertown	431	West Carbery (W.D.)	Skull	Skull
Madore	208	West Carbery (W.D.)	Caheragh	Skibbereen
Mallavoge	254	West Carbery (W.D.)	Kilmoe	Skull
Mannin Island	13	West Carbery (W.D.)	Kilcoe	Skull
Mannions Island Large	3	West Carbery (W.D.)	Durrus	Bantry
Mannions Island Small	1	West Carbery (W.D.)	Durrus	Bantry
Mauladinna	319	West Carbery (W.D.)	Skull	Skull
Maulagallane	155	West Carbery (W.D.)	Caheragh	Skibbereen
Maulinward	219	West Carbery (W.D.)	Kilmocomoge	Bantry
Maulnaskehy	535	West Carbery (W.D.)	Kilcrohane	Bantry
Maune	142	West Carbery (W.D.)	Caheragh	Skibbereen
Maunvough	230	West Carbery (W.D.)	Caheragh	Skibbereen
Meenvane	154	West Carbery (W.D.)	Skull	Skull
Milleen and Carrigacat	838	West Carbery (W.D.)	Kilmoe	Skull
Milleenahorna	119	West Carbery (W.D.)	Caheragh	Skibbereen
Mountgabriel	758	West Carbery (W.D.)	Skull	Skull
Mullaghmore	271	West Carbery (W.D.)	Caheragh	Skibbereen
Murrahin	138	West Carbery (W.D.)	Skull	Skull
Murrahin North	214	West Carbery (W.D.)	Kilcoe	Skull
Murrahin South	162	West Carbery (W.D.)	Kilcoe	Skull
Murreagh	180	West Carbery (W.D.)	Durrus	Bantry
Oughtminnee	167	West Carbery (W.D.)	Kilmoe	Skull
Oughtohig	182	West Carbery (W.D.)	Kilcoe	Skull
Owen's Island	1	West Carbery (W.D.)	Kilcrohane	Bantry
Parkana	218	West Carbery (W.D.)	Kilmocomoge	Bantry
Pointabullage	1	West Carbery (W.D.)	Kilcrohane	Bantry
Raferigeen	197	West Carbery (W.D.)	Kilcrohane	Bantry
Raheenroe	242	West Carbery (W.D.)	Skull	Skull
Rangaroe	197	West Carbery (W.D.)	Kilmocomoge	Bantry
Rathcool	401	West Carbery (W.D.)	Skull	Skull
Rathruane Beg	302	West Carbery (W.D.)	Skull	Skull
Rathruane More	267	West Carbery (W.D.)	Skull	Skull
Ratooragh	1,183	West Carbery (W.D.)	Skull	Skull
Reagh	221	West Carbery (W.D.)	Kilcrohane	Bantry
Reenacappul	185	West Carbery (W.D.)	Kilcrohane	Bantry
Rock Island	61	West Carbery (W.D.)	Kilmoe	Skull
Rossard	63	West Carbery (W.D.)	Kilcoe	Skull
Rossbrin	276	West Carbery (W.D.)	Skull	Skull
Rosskerrig	577	West Carbery (W.D.)	Kilcrohane	Bantry
Rosskerrig Mountain	283	West Carbery (W.D.)	Kilcrohane	Bantry
Rossmore	307	West Carbery (W.D.)	Durrus	Bantry
Rossnacaheragh	846	West Carbery (W.D.)	Kilcrohane	Bantry
Rusheenaniska	83	West Carbery (W.D.)	Durrus	Bantry
Scartbaun	240	West Carbery (W.D.)	Kilmocomoge	Bantry
Scarteenakillin	452	West Carbery (W.D.)	Skull	Skull
Scrahanyleary	433	West Carbery (W.D.)	Skull	Skull
Shanavagh	256	West Carbery (W.D.)	Skull	Skull
Shanavalla	128	West Carbery (W.D.)	Caheragh	Skibbereen
Shanavally	85	West Carbery (W.D.)	Kilmoe	Skull
Shantullig North	271	West Carbery (W.D.)	Skull	Skull
Shantullig South	737	West Carbery (W.D.)	Skull	Skull
Shronagree	495	West Carbery (W.D.)	Skull	Skull
Skeagh	483	West Carbery (W.D.)	Skull	Skull
Skeaghanore East	332	West Carbery (W.D.)	Kilcoe	Skull
Skeaghanore West	378	West Carbery (W.D.)	Kilcoe	Skull
**Skull**	Town	West Carbery (W.D.)	Skull	Skull
Skull	674	West Carbery (W.D.)	Skull	Skull
Spanishcove	84	West Carbery (W.D.)	Kilmoe	Skull
Sparrograda	262	West Carbery (W.D.)	Skull	Skull
Stouke	247	West Carbery (W.D.)	Skull	Skull
Toor	213	West Carbery (W.D.)	Kilmoe	Skull
Tooreen	121	West Carbery (W.D.)	Kilmoe	Skull
Tooreen	319	West Carbery (W.D.)	Kilcrohane	Bantry
Toormore	601	West Carbery (W.D.)	Kilmoe	Skull
Town Lands	53	West Carbery (W.D.)	Ross	Clonakilty
Trawlebane	499	West Carbery (W.D.)	Caheragh	Skibbereen
Tullig	192	West Carbery (W.D.)	Durrus	Bantry
Tullig	23	West Carbery (W.D.)	Kilcrohane	Bantry
Woodlands	267	West Carbery (W.D.)	Skull	Skull
