= Ahiohill =

Village in County Cork, Ireland

Ahiohill Achadh Eochaille
- Village
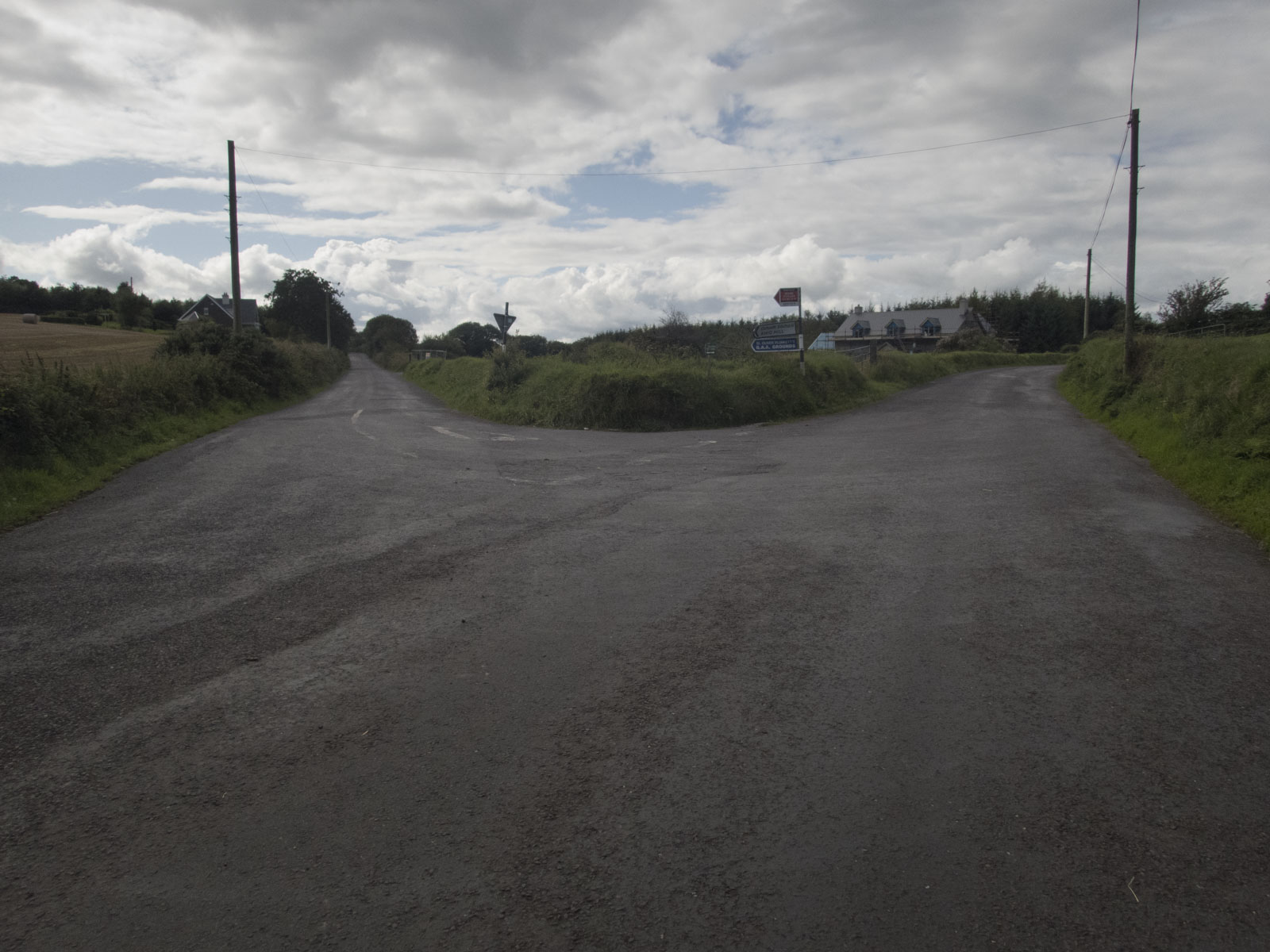
- R588 road near Ahiohill

- Location in Ireland
- Coordinates: 51.7102°N 8.8924°W
- Country: Ireland
- Province: Munster
- County: County Cork

Ahiohill (Irish: Achadh Eochaille, meaning 'field of the yew') is a small village in County Cork, Ireland. The historical spelling for the area, Aghyohil, is reflected in the names of two local townlands, Aghyohil Beg and Aghyohil More. As of the 2011 census, Aghyohil Beg was home to 29 people and Aghyohil More had a population of 76.

The village of Ahiohill lies between the towns of Bandon, Clonakilty and Ballineen/Enniskean. Ahiohill has one pub, "The Four Winds", and is home to Oliver Plunkett's GAA. The local national (primary) school, Ahiohill National School, had an enrollment of 74 pupils as of 2024. Ahiohill's Catholic church, the Church of the Assumption, dates from c. 1825 and is in the parish of Enniskeane & Desertserges in the Roman Catholic Diocese of Cork and Ross.

== See also ==
- List of towns and villages in Ireland
