= List of townlands of the barony of Courceys =

This is a sortable table of the townlands in the barony of Courceys, County Cork, Ireland. Duplicate names occur where there is more than one townland with the same name in the barony, and also where a townland is known by two alternative names. Names marked in bold typeface are towns and villages, and the word Town appears for those entries in the area column.

== Townland list ==
| Townland | Area (acres) | Barony | Civil parish | Poor law union |
|---|---|---|---|---|
| Ballincurrig | 281 | Courceys | Ringrone | Kinsale |
| Ballinroe | 110 | Courceys | Ringrone | Kinsale |
| **Ballinspittle** | Town | Courceys | Ringrone | Kinsale |
| Ballinspittle | 12 | Courceys | Ringrone | Kinsale |
| Ballinvredig | 248 | Courceys | Ringrone | Kinsale |
| Ballycatteen | 325 | Courceys | Templetrine | Kinsale |
| Ballyhander | 303 | Courceys | Ringrone | Kinsale |
| **Ballymackean** | Town | Courceys | Ringrone | Kinsale |
| Ballymackean | 295 | Courceys | Ringrone | Kinsale |
| Ballymacredmond | 61 | Courceys | Ringrone | Kinsale |
| Ballynagaragh | 297 | Courceys | Templetrine | Kinsale |
| Ballyrub | 57 | Courceys | Ringrone | Kinsale |
| Carrigvulleen | 251 | Courceys | Ringrone | Kinsale |
| Coolbane | 355 | Courceys | Ringrone | Kinsale |
| Coolyrahilly | 190 | Courceys | Ringrone | Kinsale |
| Courtaparteen | 153 | Courceys | Kilroan | Kinsale |
| Crohane | 124 | Courceys | Kilroan | Kinsale |
| Currahoo | 273 | Courceys | Ringrone | Kinsale |
| Dooneen Lower | 161 | Courceys | Kilroan | Kinsale |
| Dooneen Upper | 117 | Courceys | Kilroan | Kinsale |
| Downmacpatrick (or Oldhead) | 202 | Courceys | Ringrone | Kinsale |
| Dromdough | 332 | Courceys | Ringrone | Kinsale |
| Garrettstown | 967 | Courceys | Templetrine | Kinsale |
| Garrylucas | 151 | Courceys | Ringrone | Kinsale |
| Gortnacrusha North | 279 | Courceys | Templetrine | Kinsale |
| Gortnacrusha South | 257 | Courceys | Templetrine | Kinsale |
| **Kilcolman** | Town | Courceys | Ringrone | Kinsale |
| Kilcolman | 305 | Courceys | Ringrone | Kinsale |
| Kilkerran North | 260 | Courceys | Ringrone | Kinsale |
| Kilkerran South | 230 | Courceys | Ringrone | Kinsale |
| Killowny | 230 | Courceys | Kilroan | Kinsale |
| Kilmore | 418 | Courceys | Templetrine | Kinsale |
| Kilnacloona | 241 | Courceys | Ringrone | Kinsale |
| Knockgorm | 107 | Courceys | Kilroan | Kinsale |
| Knocknabinny | 226 | Courceys | Ringrone | Kinsale |
| Lispatrick Lower | 304 | Courceys | Ringrone | Kinsale |
| Lispatrick Upper | 271 | Courceys | Ringrone | Kinsale |
| Oldcourt | 334 | Courceys | Ringrone | Kinsale |
| Oldhead (or Downmacpatrick) | 202 | Courceys | Ringrone | Kinsale |
| Pikesland | 67 | Courceys | Ringrone | Kinsale |
