= Desertserges =

Desertserges An Díseart / Díseart Seargus
- Civil parish
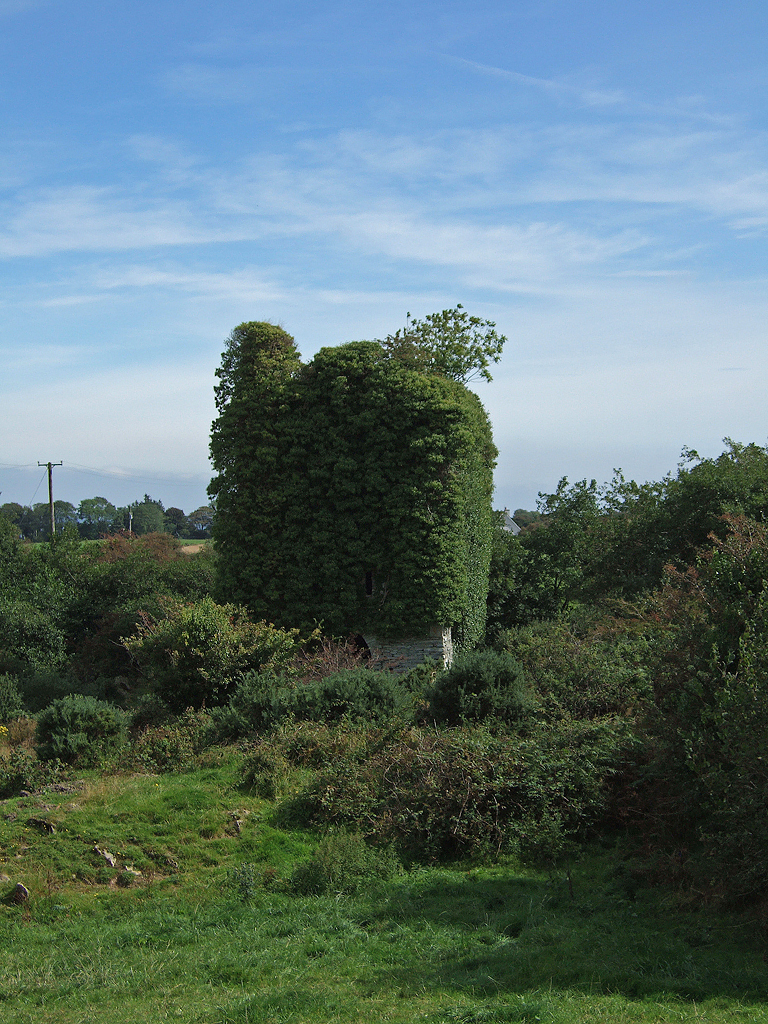
- Ruins of Derryleamleary Castle in Castlederry townland in Desertserges

- Location in Ireland
- Coordinates: 51°44′06″N 8°53′10″W
- Country: Ireland
- Province: Munster
- County: County Cork
- District: Bandon

Area
  - Total: 51.8 km^{2} (20.0 sq mi)
- Time zone: UTC+0 (WET)
  - Summer (DST): UTC-1 (IST (WEST))
- Irish Grid Reference: W413537

Desertserges (Irish: An Díseart) is a civil parish in County Cork, Ireland. It is also an ecclesiastical parish in the Roman Catholic Diocese of Cork and Ross. The parish lies between the towns of Enniskeane and Bandon. It consists of about 20 square miles (52 km^{2}) of land on the south side of the River Bandon - the river being its northern boundary for about 4 miles (6 km). Most of the area is hilly, rising from 60 to 230 meters. The fertility of the land is varied with some fertile areas as well as barren uplands.

== History ==
It is believed that the site at Desertserges may well have been sacred before the arrival of Christianity in Ireland. Looked at from the air the graveyard is fairly circular in shape, which is often an indication of pre-Christian antiquity. The early Christians often adopted sites that were already sacred.

The name of the parish comes from a hermit, named Serges who made his home somewhere in the parish. The Irish word "Díseart Seargus" literally means "the hermitage of Serges". There was a Celtic Christian monastic community at nearby Kinneigh which is believed to have been founded by St Colman between 617 and 619 CE. It is likely that Serges was a part of that community even though he would have spent much time in solitude. Desertserges was a half day's walk away from Kinneigh through the scrub and woods that grew in this area at that time, and across the river Bandon. It is not known for certain exactly where the hermitage of Serges was – some historians say it was a few metres east of the present church and that is probably where the original church stood. The present church (St Mary's) was built in 1805.

Prior to the 12th century, Desertserges was one of seven parishes which comprised a diocese of Kinneigh. In 1199 it was included in new diocese of Cork by papal decree.

In A Topographical Dictionary of Ireland, published by Samuel Lewis in 1837, Desertserges is described as containing 6,629 inhabitants.

== Today ==
Today, Desertserges remains a rural parish. There was one primary school, Desertserges National School, which was described as "Ireland's smallest primary school" prior to its closure in 2020.

Agriculture remains a dominant local industry.

== People ==
The 19th-century economist, Samuel Mountifort Longfield (1802–1884), was born in Desertserges.

== Townlands ==
- Aghyohil Beg
- Aghyohil More
- Ardkitt East
- Ardkitt West
- Ballinard
- Ballyvoige
- Breaghna
- Boulteen
- Cappaknockane
- Castlederry
- Carhoovauler
- Carrigroe
- Cashel Beg
- Cashel Commons
- Cashelmore
- Crohane East
- Crohane West
- Currane
- Dangan More
- Derry
- Derrymeeleen
- Drombofinny
- Farrannasheshery
- Garranelahan
- Garranes
- Kilbeloge
- Kilcolman
- Kilcolmanpark
- Killeen
- Kilnameela
- Kilrush
- Kill South
- Kilmoylerane South
- Kilmoylerane North
- Knockacullen
- Knockmacool
- Knocknanuss
- Knocknagallagh
- Knocknastooka
- Knocks
- Lisbehegh
- Lisnacunna
- Maulbrack East
- Maulbrack West
- Maulnarouga South
- Maulnarouga North
- Maulrour
- Moneens
- Tullymurrihy
