= Charleville, County Cork =

Town in County Cork, Ireland

Charleville Ráth Luirc (Irish)
- Town
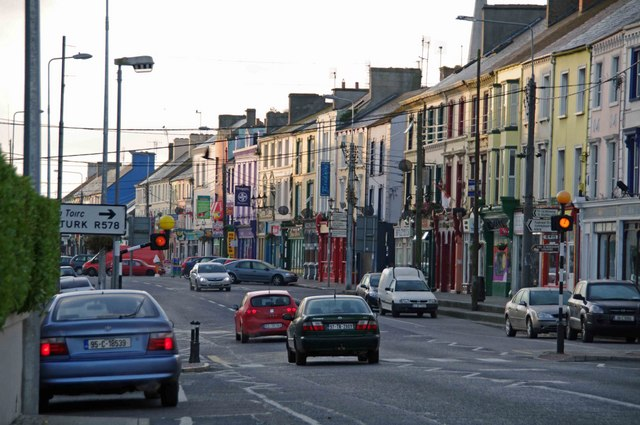
- Charleville town centre

- Location in Ireland
- Coordinates: 52.355°N 8.684°W
- Country: Ireland
- Province: Munster
- County: Cork
- Elevation: 100 m (330 ft)

Population (2022)https://www.citypopulation.de/en/ireland/towns/cork/18777__rathluirc
  - Total: 3,970
  - Ethnicity (2011 Census): Ethnic groups: 93.44% White; 69.72% White Irish; 19.51% White Other; 4.21% Irish Traveller; 1.86% Asian/Asian Irish; 0.66% Black/Black Irish; 3.02% Bi-Racial/Other; 1.02% Not Stated
- Irish Grid Reference: R530230

Charleville (Irish: Ráth Luirc or An Ráth) is a town in County Cork, Ireland. It lies in the Golden Vale, on a tributary of the River Maigue, known as the Glen River, near the border with County Limerick. Charleville is on the N20 road and is the second-largest town between Limerick and Cork after Mallow. The Roman Catholic parish of Charleville is within the Diocese of Cloyne. Significant industries in the town include Kerry Dairy Ireland, the engineering, construction and services sectors.

== Names ==
The old name for the place was Rathcogan, later Rathgogan or Rathgoggan, the last (Irish: Ráth an Ghogánaigh) still the name of the civil parish around the town. The name means Cogan's rath (ringfort), after the family of Miles de Cogan, granted lands there after the 12th-century Norman invasion. The new town begun by Roger Boyle, 1st Earl of Orrery in 1661 was named Charleville after Charles II, who had been restored to the throne the previous year.

Later Irish speakers referred to the town as An Ráth "the rath", a short form of the older Irish name. The name Ráth Luirc ["Lorc's rath"] was first attached to Charleville in an 1849 collection of 18th-century Irish-language poems with English translations. (Note: The English versions were by James Clarence Mangan, who knew no Irish and so must have received assistance from an unknown translator.) The translation of an aisling by Conchúbhar Máistir Ó Ríordáin interpreted Ráth Loirc as denoting the town of Charleville. T. F. O'Rahilly felt that Ráth Loirc, like the more common Clár Loirc, was a poetic name for Ireland. D. A. Binchy felt the term, also used by Aogán Ó Rathaille, did refer to a specific place, but likely somewhere in Muskerry, not Charleville. After the 1920 local elections, Sinn Féin-dominated councils loyal to the self-proclaimed Irish Republic often sought to replace placenames having British monarchic allusions with older Gaelic names. Although Rathgoggan was mooted by Charleville Rural District Council, Risteárd Ó Foghladha ["Fiachra Eilgeach"] advised that Ráth Luirc was the old name, and it was changed to Rathluirc in 1920. Ó Foghladh claimed Lorc was an ancient king of Munster; in fact Lóegaire Lorc was a mythical High King of Ireland.

The Placenames Commission was established in the 1940s to systematically determine the authentic Irish names of places, and based on its advice that An Ráth was the commonly used name among the last generations of local Irish speakers, this was legally made the Irish name in 1975. Thus the town had the anomalous position that its English-language legal name was an Irish name different from its Irish-language legal name. The name "Charleville" remained in common use. In December 1989, a plebiscite of residents under the Local Government Act 1946 voted on four names: of 2,200 electors, 1,500 (over 68%) voted for Charleville. Official documents before and after 1989 have often used "Rathluirc (Charleville)" or similar formulations. Local sports teams have a rath or fort in their crest, reflecting the Irish name.

The town of Charleville, Queensland, Australia may well have been named after the County Cork town.

== History ==
Charleville was founded in 1661 by Roger Boyle, 1st Earl of Orrery. Roger Boyle had been a supporter of Oliver Cromwell in the English Civil War. When King Charles II was restored in 1660, he had to prove his loyalty to the crown. He did this by naming Charleville after the English king. The villages of Brohill and Rathgoggin, who in their former guise preceded the formation of the town of Charleville in the area, fell under the rule of the following political entities: the Eoghanachta of southern Munster, at some point by the Hiberno-Norman Lordships of Ireland 1169–1541 (although this rule was nominal rather than actual), and subsequently by the Kingdom of Desmond 1118 – 1596. The lands of Broghill and Rathgogan were purchased by Roger's father Richard Boyle as a part of the Plantation of Munster and Roger subsequently established his residency there after the founding of Charleville.

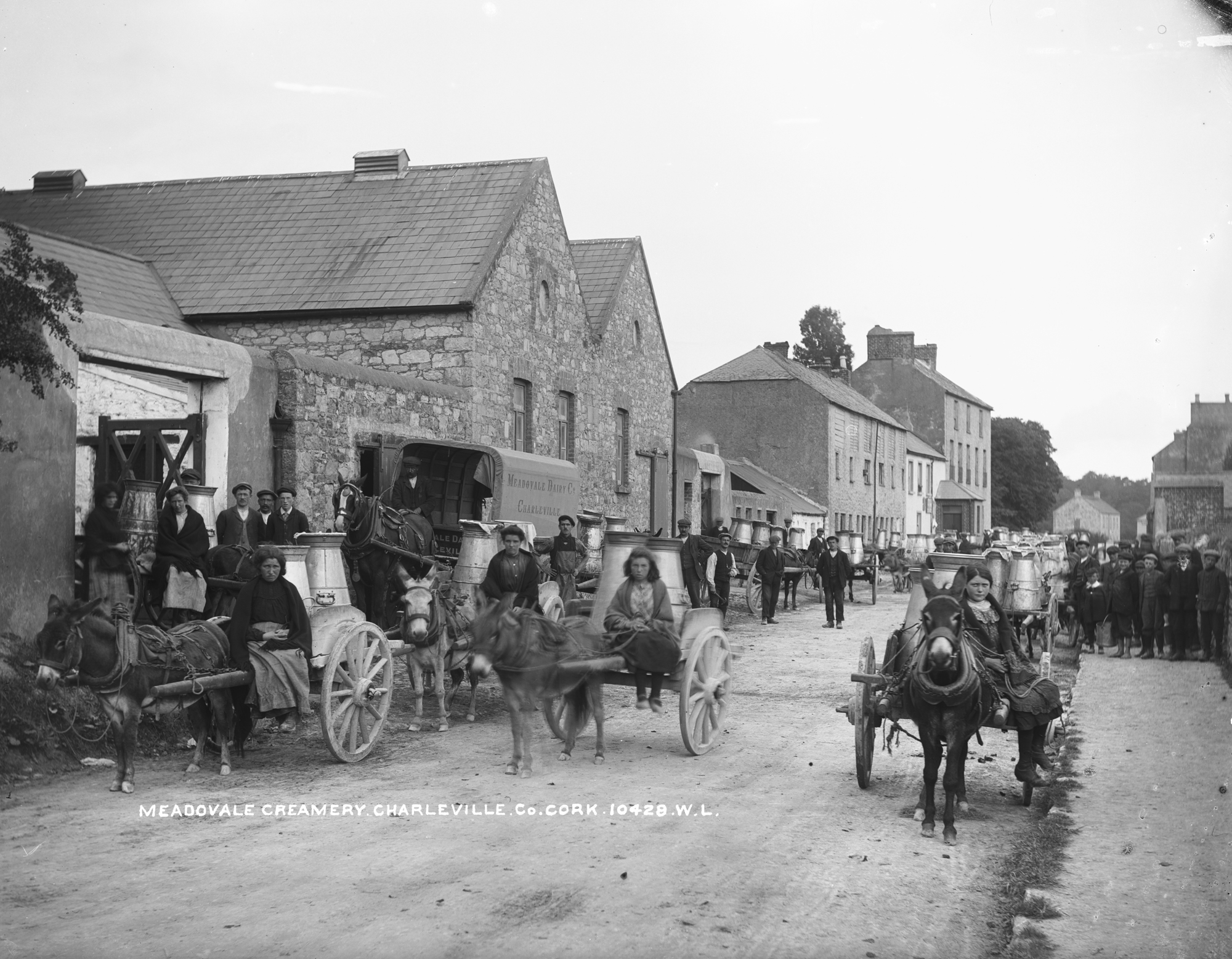
Charleville, c.1909–1912

During the time of the Penal Laws, practising the Catholic faith was illegal. As a result, the parish of Charleville was amalgamated with the parishes Bruree and Colmanswell, both in the Diocese of Limerick. In 1704, Fr. Daniel Mac Namara of Bruree was registered as the Catholic priest for this very large pastoral area. The fact that Catholics had to attend Mass secretly meant that the old chapel in Holy Cross cemetery was abandoned. The remains of this church – now overgrown with ivy – are still to be seen in the centre of the graveyard. Indeed, like so many other pre-1700 churches, the old church of Holy Cross literally became part of the surrounding graveyard, in that several gravestones, both marked and unmarked, are to be found within the building itself. Upon one such gravestone is a Latin epitaph to none other than Seán Clárach Mac Domhnaill (1691–1754), who was, in his time, the Chief Poet of Munster, as well as a resident of Charleville.

William Alcock Tully, commissioner of Crown lands in the Kennedy and Warrego pastoral districts and 2nd Surveyor General of Queensland spent his formative years here. During this time, he surveyed the townsite of Charleville, Queensland which he named after Charleville, County Cork.

== Geography ==
Charleville is geographically located at 'the heart of Munster', within the Golden Vale region. It is 60 km from Cork city to the south and 40 km from Limerick city to the north.

A controversial modular home site for Ukrainian refugees was built near the charleville park hotel in 2023-24. It contains 68 two-bedroom units, housing over 200 people.

== Economy ==
=== Engineering ===
Numerous spin-offs both in the town of Charleville and the surrounding area were created when Golden Vale Engineering closed its doors in 1983. The largest amongst these were BCD Engineering, Diamond Engineering and Sapphire Engineering. BCD is the second largest employer in Charleville. One of Ireland’s largest plant and platform hire companies, Charleville Plant Hire, owned by British multinational VP plc is headquartered in Charleville.

=== Dairy ===
Charleville is a centre for the food processing industry. Kerry Foods (part of Kerry Dairy Ireland and formerly of Kerry Group) produce cheese products in the town. One such product is Cheestrings, a peelable cheese stick marketed to children. It is a hugely successful product since being launched in 1994 and is currently sold in Ireland, the UK and many countries in mainland Europe. It also produces Low Low cheese spreads. Kerry Foods is the largest employer in Charleville.

== Culture ==
=== Social ===
Charleville has numerous pubs as well as two theatre facilities and is home to the North Cork Drama Festival which is held in the Parochial Hall. The second facility is the Schoolyard Theatre which is home to the Shoestring Theatre group.

=== Sport ===
Sporting clubs in the area include Charleville GAA club and Charleville Camogie Club. The Ráth Luirc GAA Sports Centre has squash, badminton and tennis facilities. There is also a handball court in the area.

The local rugby club is Charleville and District RFC, and soccer club is Charleville AFC.

Charleville Golf Club and Charleville Pitch and Putt Club are also based locally.

The town also has a successful Muay Thai Club, Wolfhound Muay Thai.

== Transport ==
Charleville is at the junction of the N20 national road and the R515 regional road. The N20 runs north–south from Limerick to Cork cities, the R515 east–west from Tipperary town to near Abbeyfeale. The R578 runs from Charleville to Ballydesmond. Charleville is on Bus Éireann routes 51 (Cork – Limerick – Shannon Airport – Ennis - Galway) and 320 (Limerick – Charleville). It is 65 km from both Cork Airport and Shannon Airport.

Charleville railway station is on the Dublin–Cork railway line. It opened in 1849 on the Great Southern and Western Railway. The former Cork–Limerick line branched off the Cork–Dublin line at Charleville, continuing via Croom; the final goods train ran in 1976, since when Limerick Junction, already the junction for Dublin–Limerick, has also been the junction for Cork–Limerick.

== Politics ==
Charleville lies within the Cork North-West Dáil constituency. It has been represented nationally by Fianna Fáil TDs Michael Moynihan, Andreas Moynihan and Fine Gael TD John Paul O'Shea since the 2024 general election.

Charleville is located within the Kanturk Local Electoral Area of Cork County Council. Its local councillor is Ian Doyle.

== Education ==
Secondary schools in the area include CBS Charleville, St. Mary's Secondary School Charleville, and Mannix College (which is no longer a secondary School, but has since become part of Cork College of FET Charleville Centre). Other schools include Charleville CBS Primary, St. Anne's Primary School, St. Joseph's National School and the Holy Family School, a school for children with special needs.

Charleville's library is located in the former Church of Ireland church of the parish (which went into disrepair in the 1950/1960s when the Protestant population of the area declined).

== People ==
- Éamon de Valera (1882–1975), former Taoiseach and President, was educated at C.B.S Charleville
- Aaron Doran (b.1991), Irish soccer and 2015 Scottish Cup winner with Inverness Caledonian Thistle
- Darragh Fitzgibbon (b.1997), hurler for the Cork senior hurling team, three time Munster championship winner, twice All Star
- Keith Hanley (b.1993), winner of The Voice of Ireland series 2
- Con Leahy (1876–1921), athlete who won Olympic medals at the 1906 and 1908 Games, born Charleville
- Eliza Lynch (1833–1886), former first lady of Paraguay, was born locally
- Seán Clárach Mac Domhnaill (1691–1754), Chief Poet of Munster who was born in nearby Churchtown, lived in the area
- Daniel Mannix (1864–1963), Archbishop of Melbourne for 46 years, and one of the most influential public figures in 20th-century Australia, was born near Charleville
- William Reeves (1815–1892), antiquarian, bishop, and President of the Royal Irish Academy, was born in Charleville

== Town twinning ==
Charleville is twinned with Plouaret – Le Vieux-Marché, Brittany, in France.

== See also ==
- List of towns and villages in Ireland
- Market Houses in Ireland
- Charleville (Parliament of Ireland constituency)
