= Ireland's Greatest =

Television series

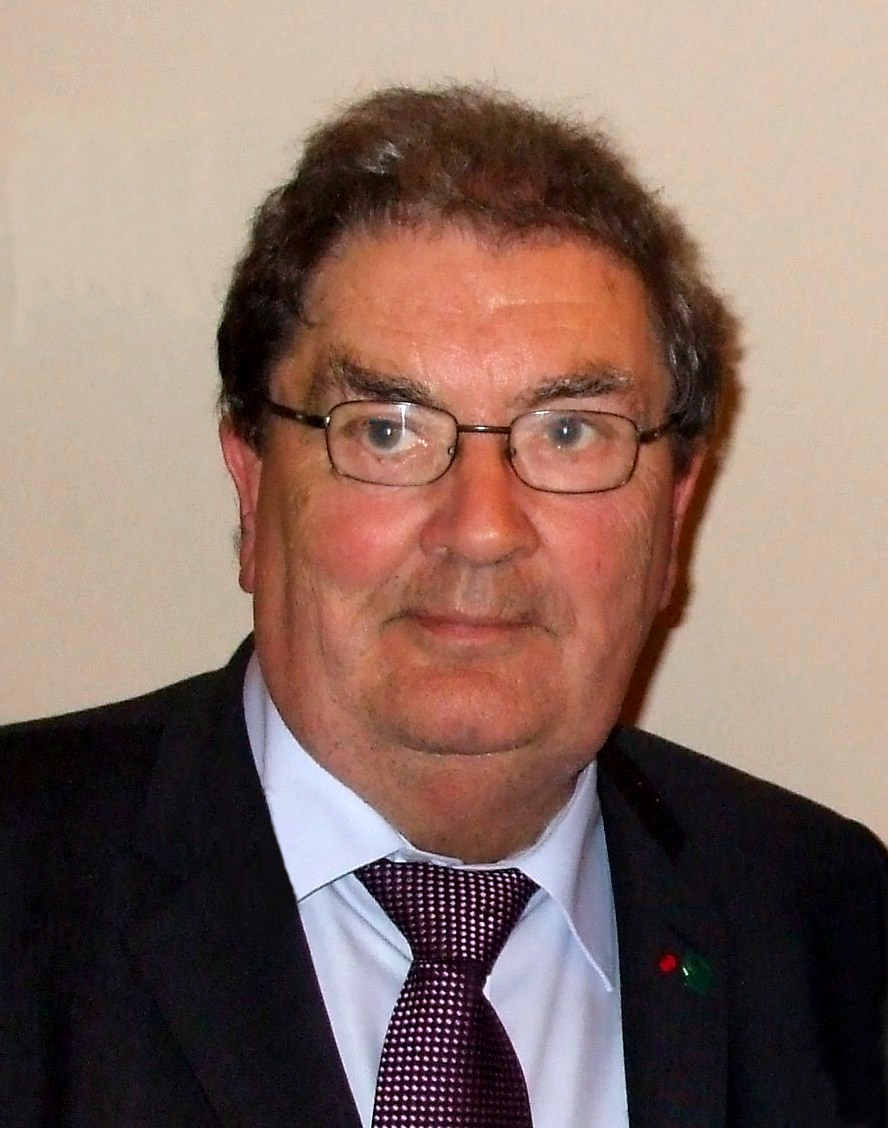
1. John Hume was leader of the Social Democratic and Labour Party, recipient of the 1998 Nobel Peace Prize and key figure in the Northern Ireland peace process.

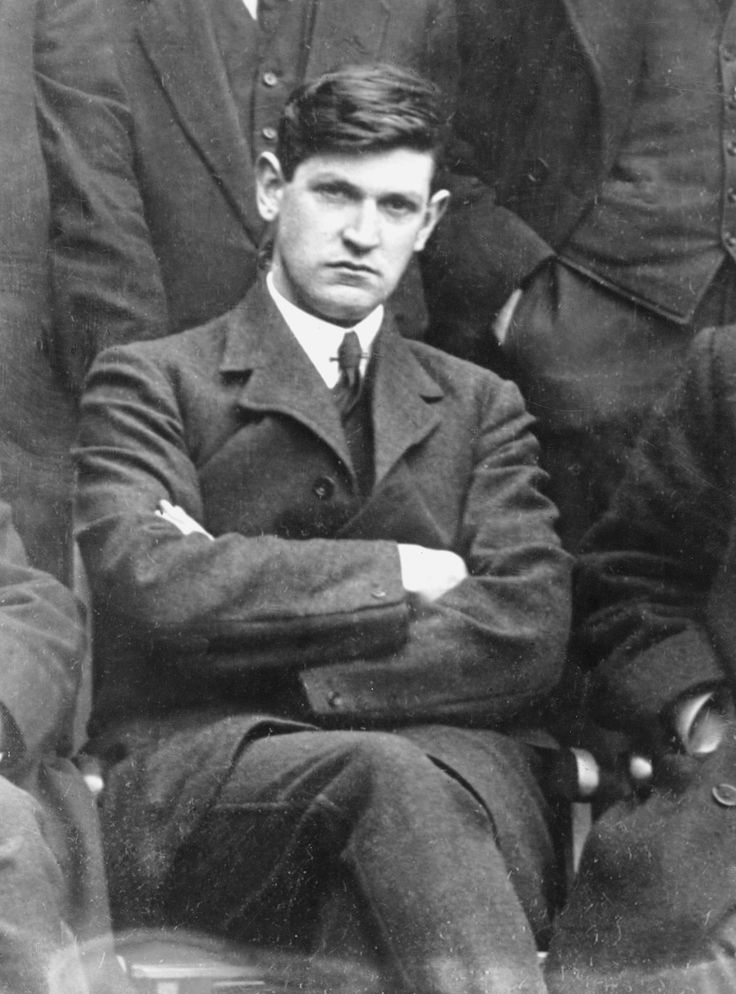
2. Michael Collins was a leading political and military figure in the fight for Irish independence.

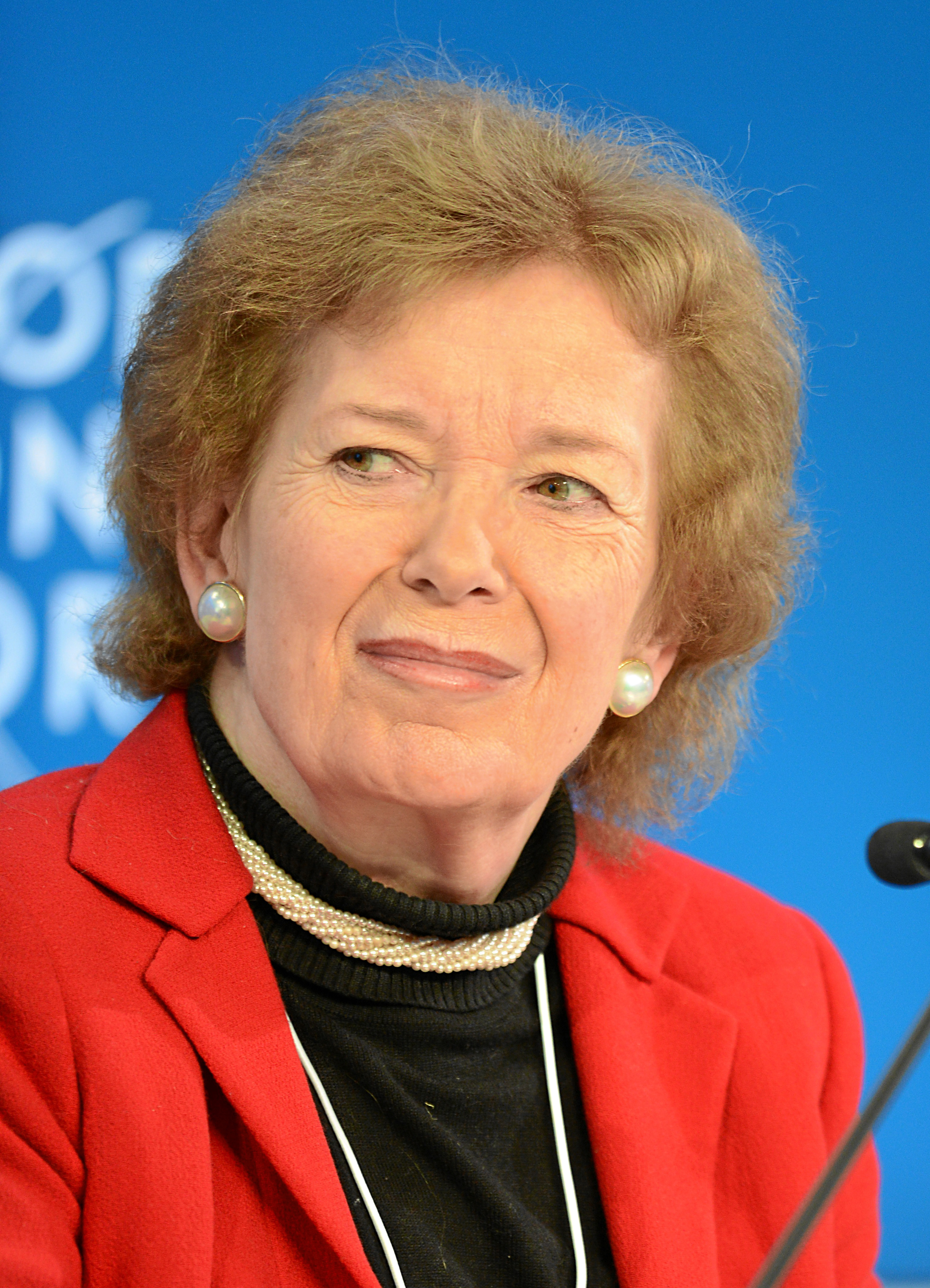
3. Mary Robinson was the first female President of Ireland and also United Nations High Commissioner for Human Rights and Global Elder.

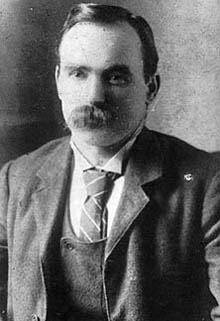
4. James Connolly was a socialist leader, founder of the Labour Party and leader in the Easter Rising.

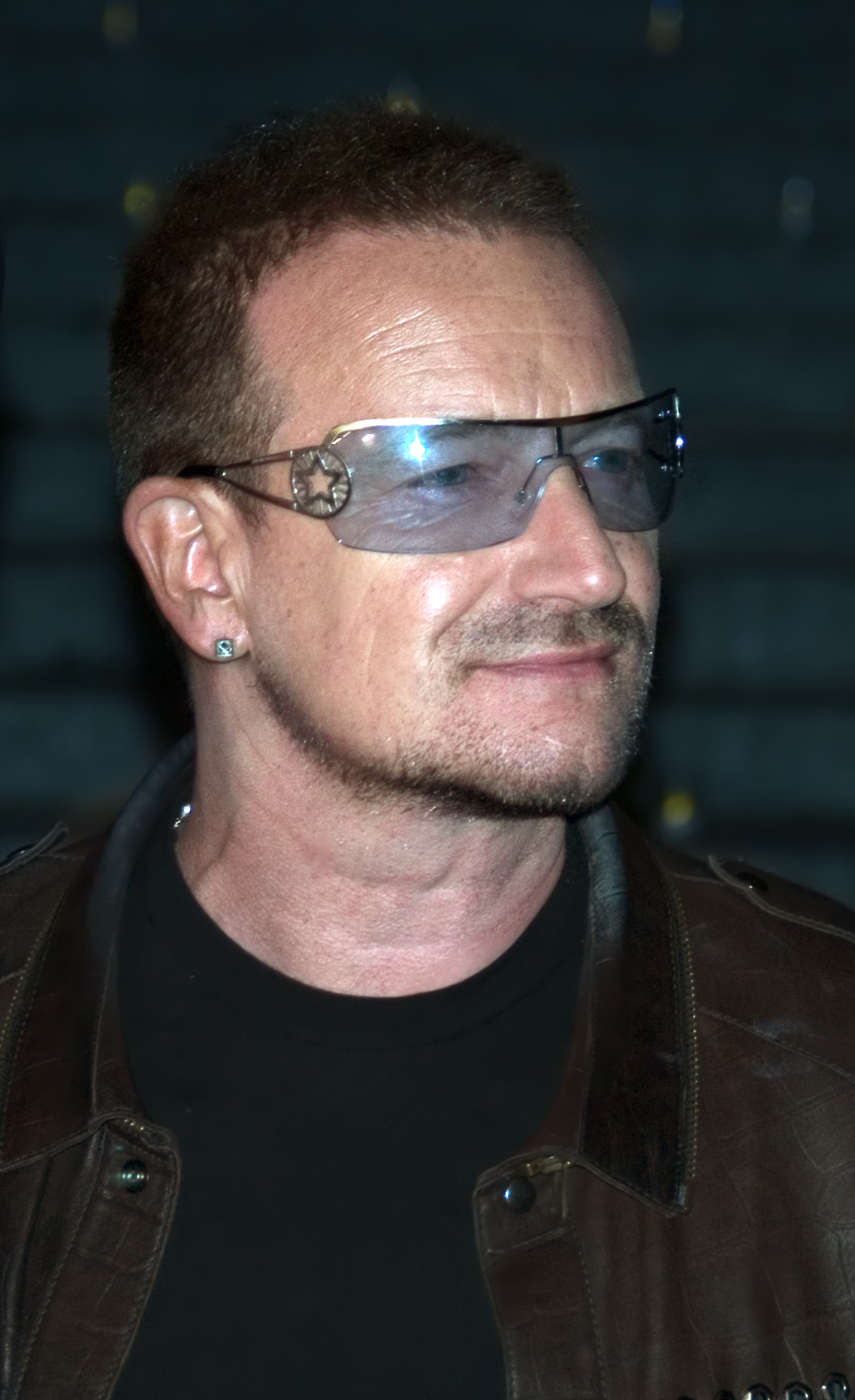
5. Bono is the lead singer in rock band U2.

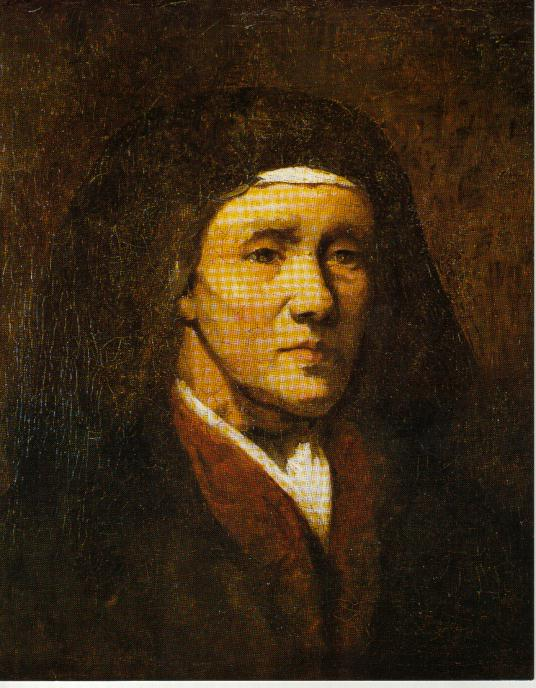
Ireland's Greatest Woman: Nano Nagle founded the Presentation Sisters.

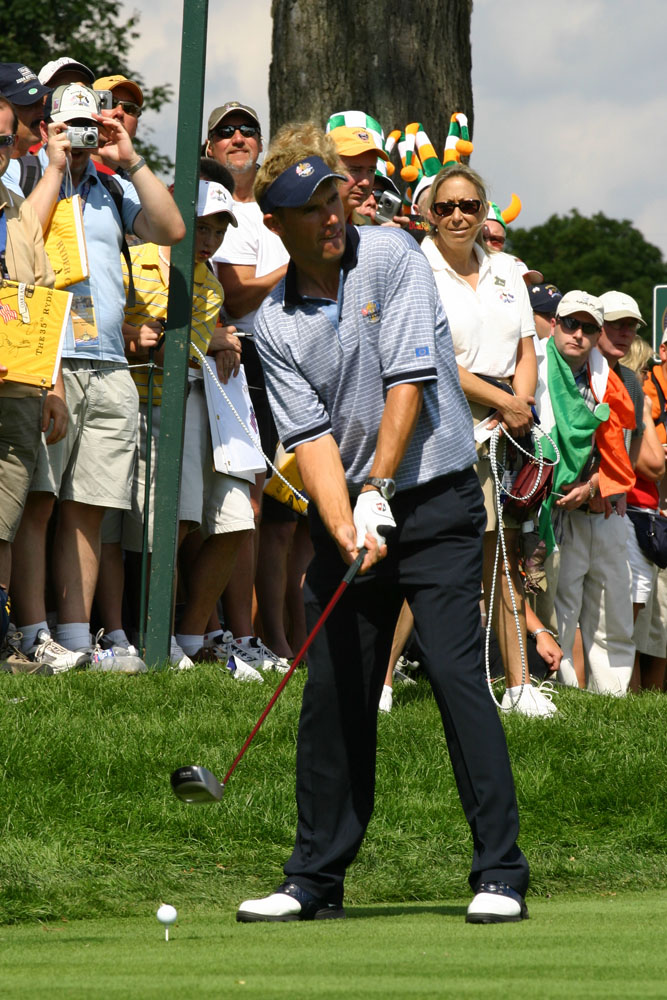
Ireland's Greatest Sportsperson: Pádraig Harrington has won three golf majors.

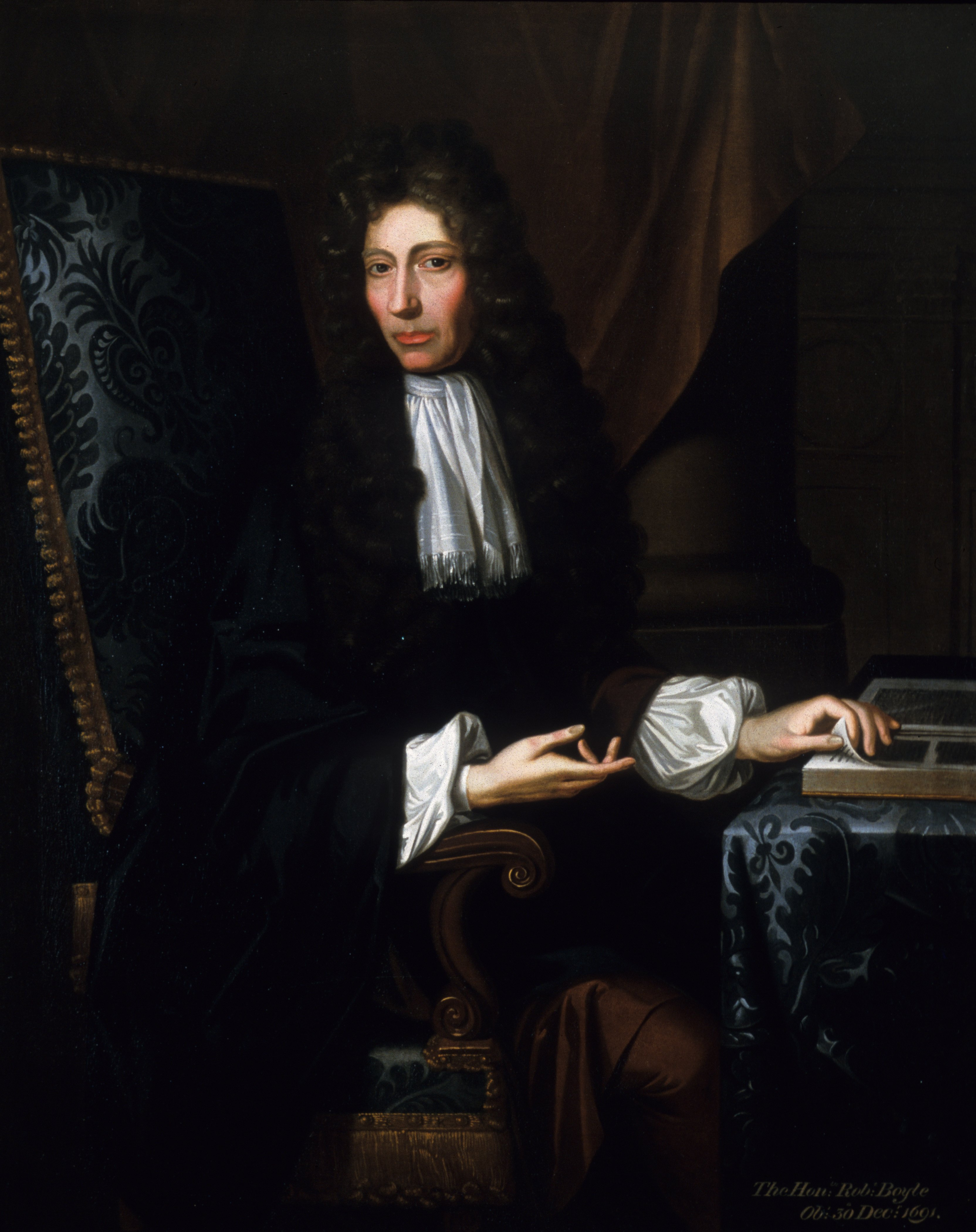
Ireland's Greatest Scientist: Robert Boyle founded modern chemistry and discovered Boyle's law.

Ireland's Greatest is a 2010 public poll by Raidió Teilifís Éireann (RTÉ), and an associated television documentary series broadcast on RTÉ One, where viewers voted to choose the greatest person in the history of Ireland. The concept was based on the BBC series 100 Greatest Britons. The winner was John Hume.

== Format ==
To draw up an initial shortlist of 40 names, RTÉ commissioned an opinion poll of 1,000 members of the public, carried out by Ipsos MRBI in late 2009. The shortlist was published on 22 March 2010 on the RTÉ.ie website, and readers could vote for their preferred person for 12 days, ending on 2 April; one vote per IP address was permitted. The top ten was announced on The Tubridy Show with Myles Dungan on 5 April 2010. The top five was established at this point, but not publicised until RTÉ's programming schedule for autumn 2010 was unveiled in August. Each of the top five was profiled in a one-hour documentary programme broadcast in autumn 2010 and presented by a public figure advocating that person's claim to the title of "greatest person". Viewers voted for the overall winner, announced on The Late Late Show on 22 October 2010.

== Rankings ==
=== Top five ===
The ranking of the top five, and the advocates who each present a one-hour documentary about one of them, were as follows:

Place	Nominee	Presenter
1	John Hume	Miriam O'Callaghan
2	Michael Collins	Michael McDowell
3	Mary Robinson	David McWilliams
4	James Connolly	Joe Duffy
5	Bono	Dave Fanning

=== Top 40 ===
The following people were shortlisted:

Rank	Name	Born	Died	Field(s)
1	John Hume	1937	2020	Politics
2	Michael Collins	1890	1922	Politics
3	Mary Robinson	1944		Politics
4	James Connolly	1868	1916	Politics
5	Bono	1960		Music, charity
6–10	Noël Browne	1915	1997	Politics
6–10	Stephen Gately	1976	2009	Music
6–10	Phil Lynott	1951	1986	Music
6–10	Pádraig Pearse	1879	1916	Politics
6–10	Adi Roche	1955		Charity
11–40	Éamon de Valera	1882	1975	Politics
11–40	Joe Dolan	1939	2007	Music
11–40	Ronnie Drew	1934	2008	Music
11–40	Colin Farrell	1976		Acting
11–40	Garret FitzGerald	1926	2011	Politics
11–40	Bob Geldof	1951		Charity, music
11–40	Pádraig Harrington	1971		Sport
11–40	Charles Haughey	1925	2006	Politics
11–40	Séamus Heaney	1939	2013	Literature
11–40	James Joyce	1882	1941	Literature
11–40	John B. Keane	1928	2002	Literature
11–40	Roy Keane	1971		Sport
11–40	Ronan Keating	1977		Music
11–40	Seán Lemass	1899	1971	Politics
11–40	Jack Lynch	1917	1999	Politics, sport
11–40	Paul McGrath	1959		Sport
11–40	Christy Moore	1945		Music
11–40	Liam Neeson	1952		Acting
11–40	Daniel O'Connell	1775	1847	Politics
11–40	Daniel O'Donnell	1961		Music
11–40	Brian O'Driscoll	1979		Sport
11–40	Michael O'Leary	1961		Business
11–40	John O'Shea	1944		Charity
11–40	Sonia O'Sullivan	1969		Sport
11–40	Charles Stewart Parnell	1846	1891	Politics
11–40	Christy Ring	1920	1979	Sport
11–40	Theobald Wolfe Tone	1763	1798	Politics
11–40	Louis Walsh	1952		Music manager
11–40	Oscar Wilde	1854	1900	Literature
11–40	William Butler Yeats	1865	1939	Literature

== Criticism ==
The list of nominees for Ireland's Greatest was criticised by historians Diarmuid Ferriter, Tim Pat Coogan, and Maurice Manning, and Irish Times columnist Noel Whelan. They said that the list was skewed towards recent times, and that many nominees were celebrities from popular culture or sport rather than people who had made a lasting contribution to society; Ferriter said "It is going to be very hard to take this seriously for historians". Ryan Tubridy, who presents The Late Late Show, commented, "There are some really silly names in there. It's contentious to say the least". Liam Dolan in the Sunday Independent called it "a shambolic litany of well-intentioned do-gooders and talented non-entities". People whose inclusion attracted criticism included Stephen Gately, Louis Walsh and Daniel O'Donnell. The Belfast Telegraph noted the absence of Van Morrison and George Best; other absentees noted were Michael Davitt, John McCormack, William Rowan Hamilton, Lady Gregory, and Samuel Beckett. Ken Sweeney in the Irish Independent criticised the ranking of Stephen Gately ahead of Éamon de Valera. The dearth of women —3 out of 40— was also noted. Website science.ie responded to the lack of scientists on the RTÉ shortlist by organising its own poll for Ireland's greatest scientist, won by Robert Boyle.

=== Ireland's Greatest Women ===
In 2005, Marian Finucane's radio show organised a similar poll to find Ireland's greatest woman. There were some claims of ballot-stuffing. The top ten were:

1. Nano Nagle, (1718-1784) founder of the Presentation Sisters
2. Mary Robinson, (1944-) President of Ireland and UN High Commissioner for Human Rights
3. Michelle Smith, (1969-) winner of three gold medals and a bronze medal in swimming at the 1996 Summer Olympics
4. Saint Brigid, (451–525) 4th/5th century abbess and one of Ireland's patron saints (many modern historians believe Brigid to be fictional)
5. Grace O'Malley, (c.1530–c.1603) Galway pirate
6. Christina Noble, (1944-) founder of the Christina Noble Children's Foundation
7. Edel Quinn, (1907-1944) Catholic missionary
8. Sophia McColgan, child abuse survivor
9. Kathleen Lynn, (1874-1955) suffragette, Sinn Féin TD and Easter Rising participant
10. Nora Herlihy, (1910–1988) co-founder of the Irish League of Credit Unions

=== Ireland's Greatest Sportsperson ===
In September 2009, RTÉ ran an online poll in sponsored by Paddy Power to nominate Ireland's greatest sportsperson. A shortlist of 32 names was selected by a panel of experts. The top ten was announced on 31 December 2009:

1. Pádraig Harrington (1971-) (golf)
2. Brian O'Driscoll (1979-) (rugby union)
3. Joey Dunlop (1952-2000) (motorcycling)
4. George Best (1946-2005) (soccer)
5. Roy Keane (1971-) (soccer)
6. Sean Kelly (1956-) (cycling)
7. Sonia O'Sullivan (1969-) (athletics)
8. Christy Ring (1920-1979) (hurling and Gaelic football)
9. Vincent O'Brien (1917-2009) (horse racing)
10. Paul McGrath (1959-) (soccer)

The other 22 were: D. J. Carey, Eamonn Coghlan, Ronnie Delany, Ken Doherty, Mike Gibson, Johnny Giles, Kevin Heffernan, Alex Higgins, Jack Kyle, Eddie Macken, Tony McCoy, Barry McGuigan, Aidan O'Brien, Mick O'Connell, Christy O'Connor Snr, Mick O'Dwyer, Jack O'Shea, Mary Peters, Stephen Roche, Henry Shefflin, Michelle Smith, and John Treacy.

=== Ireland's Greatest Scientist ===
In 2010, the website www.sfi.ie selected its Top 10 Irish scientists, in response to the exclusion of scientists from the RTÉ longlist.

1. Robert Boyle, (1627-1691) founder of modern chemistry and discover of Boyle's law
2. William Rowan Hamilton, (1805-1865) mathematician who developed Hamiltonian mechanics and discovered quaternions
3. Ernest Walton, (1903-1995) physicist who "split the atom"; at the time of broadcast, the only Irish Nobel laureate in a science (Physics, 1951)
4. Kathleen Lonsdale, (1903-1971) X-ray crystallographer who discovered the molecular structure of benzene and diamonds
5. Dorothy Price, (1890-1954) introduced the BCG tuberculosis vaccine to Ireland
6. John Tyndall, (1820-1893) physicist who studied radiant energy in air
7. Harry Ferguson, (1884-1960) inventor of the modern tractor
8. George Gabriel Stokes, (1819-1903) physicist who worked in fluid dynamics, optics and mathematical physics; also discovered Stokes' theorem
9. Fr Nicholas Callan, (1799-1864) who invented the modern induction coil
10. Charles Algernon Parsons, (1854-1931) inventor of the steam turbine
11. William Thomson, 1st Baron Kelvin, (1824-1907) who formulated the first and second Laws of Thermodynamics

== Other editions ==
Other countries have produced similar shows; see Greatest Britons spin-offs
