= Kiskeam =

Village in County Cork, Ireland

Kiskeam Coiscéim na Caillí
- Village
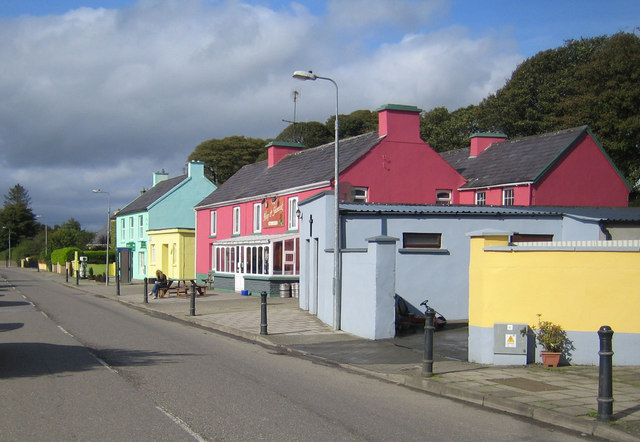
- Post office and bar on Kiskeam's main street

- Location in Ireland
- Coordinates: 52.176°N 9.157°W
- Country: Ireland
- Province: Munster
- County: County Cork
- Time zone: UTC+0 (WET)
  - Summer (DST): UTC-1 (IST (WEST))

Kiskeam or Kishkeam (Irish: Coiscéim na Caillí) is a village in north-west County Cork, Ireland. It is in the civil parish of Kilmeen in the historical barony of Duhallow. Kiskeam is within the Cork North-West Dáil constituency. It is around 35 km west of Mallow, and 55 km north-west of Cork city.

== Transport ==
Kiskeam lies on the R577 road which connects the N72 at Cloonbannin Cross to Castleisland and the N21, linking Mallow to Tralee.

The closest rail links include Millstreet, Rathmore and Mallow train stations.

== Sport ==
In men sports Kiskeam is represented by Kiskeam GAA which is a Gaelic Football club only and competes in the Cork Senior Football Championship.

In women's Gaelic football Kiskeam play for Araglen Desmonds Buí which is a combined team representing Kiskeam, Ballydesmond and Boherbue.
