= R668 road (Ireland) =

Road in Ireland

R668 road
- Bóthar R668
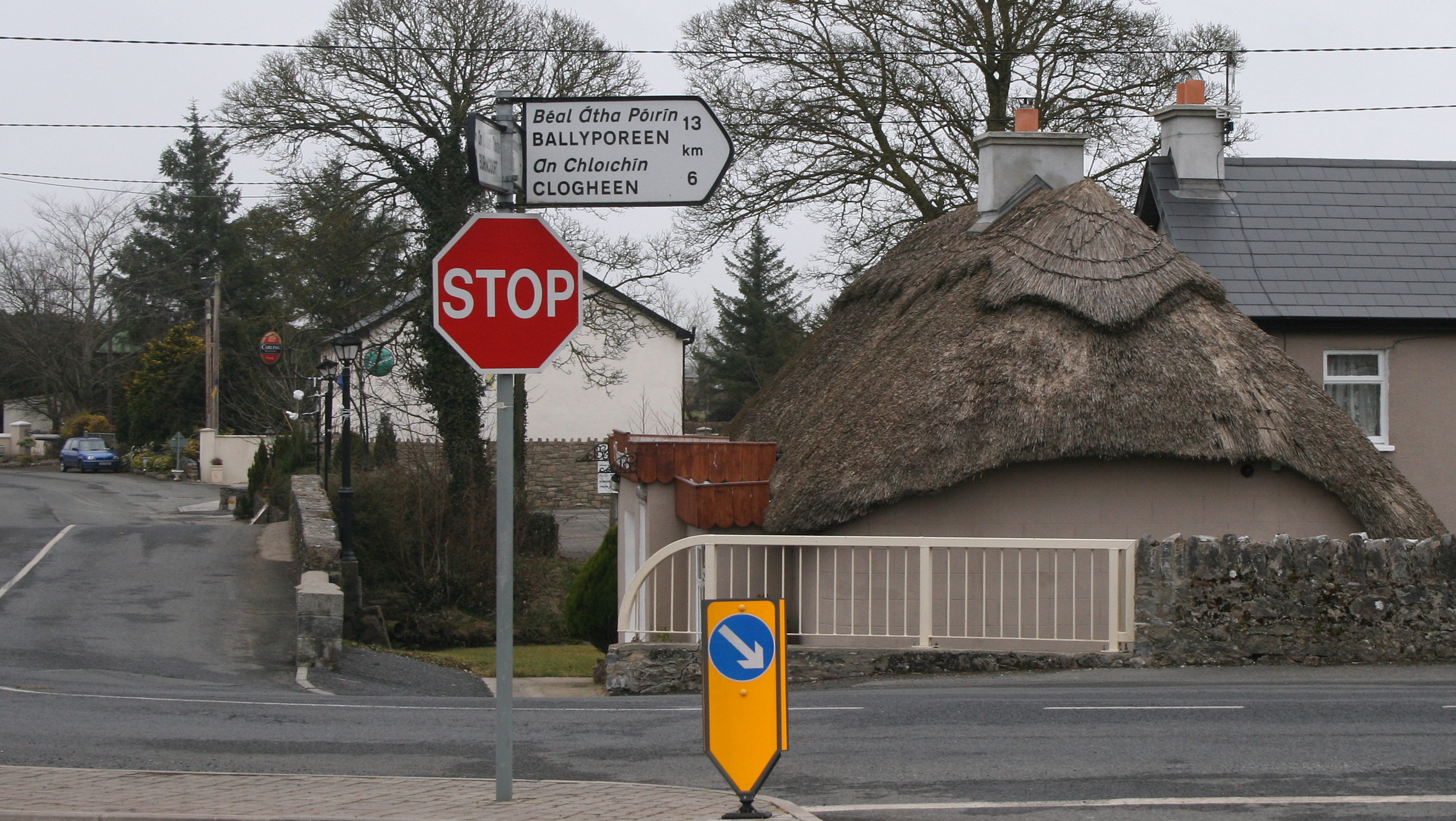
- R668 through Ballylooby

Major junctions
- From: R913 at Mitchelstown Road, Cahir, County Tipperary
- R665 at Parsons Green; Enter County Waterford
- To: N72 at Ballyrafter

Location
- Country: Ireland

Highway system
- Roads in Ireland; Motorways; Primary; Secondary; Regional
← R667	→ R669

The R668 road is a regional road in Ireland from Lismore, County Waterford to Cahir in County Tipperary, through Clogheen and Ballylooby. The Lismore–Clogheen section is a scenic route through the Vee Gap (Irish: Bóthar na gCorr) in the Knockmealdown Mountains, between Sugarloaf Hill and Knockshanahullion.

In the eighteenth century, the Cahir–Clogheen section was part of the main road from Cashel to Cork city. It was superseded in the early 19th century by the construction of what is now the R639 road between Cahir and Mitchelstown.

The R665 crosses the R668 at Clogheen. At Glentanagree Bridge, the R669 forks off to the south east past Mount Melleray to Cappoquin.
