= R577 road =

R577 road may refer to:

- R577 road (Ireland)
- R577 (South Africa)
