= River Allow =

River in Counties Cork and Limerick, Ireland, tributary of the Munster Blackwater

Coordinates: 52.312156°N 9.069836°W

- Etymology: echoing river / swan river
- Native name: Abhainn Ealla (Irish)

Physical characteristics
- Source
  - location: Mullaghareirk Mountains
- Mouth: River Dalua and Munster Blackwater
  - location: Leader's Bridge, County Cork
- Length: 36.61 km (22.75 mi)
- Basin size: 316 km^{2} (122 sq mi)
- Discharge
  - average: 7.46 m^{3}/s (263 cu ft/s)

The River Allow (/ˈæloʊ/; Irish: Abhainn Ealla) is a river in Ireland, flowing through County Limerick and County Cork.

== Course ==
The Allow rises in the Mullaghareirk Mountains and forms part of the County Limerick–County Cork border before flowing eastwards, passing under the R579 and meeting a tributary near Freemount, passing under the R578 and continuing southward to Kanturk where it meets the River Dalua. The Allow then flows southwards, passing under the N72 at Leader's Bridge and enters the Munster Blackwater at Ballymaquirk/Dromcummer Beg. The Munster Blackwater drains into the Celtic Sea at Youghal Harbour.

== Special Area of Conservation ==
The River Allow is included in the Special Area of Conservation: Blackwater River (Cork/Waterford) SAC (Site Code 002170).

== Wildlife ==
The River Allow is a salmon fishery.

In conjunction with conservation and remedial ecological work, a biodiversity audit was carried out by the IRD Duhallow Life+ project to establish baselines for the species which inhabit this catchment and those which would be expected but were missing, with a view to reparative action. The audit was primarily directed at specific species: European Otter (Lutra lutra), Kingfisher (Alcedo atthis) and the Irish subspecies of Dipper (Cinclus cinclus hibernicus). Numbers of each species were recorded between 2011 and 2015. Otter activity was noted at 56.56% of the surveyed sites on the Allow, with the lowest rates recorded in 2012. While a previous study in 2010 by Cummins et al found no kingfishers on the River Allow, six distinct Kingfisher territories were noted in this study (either currently or previously inhabited). Kingfisher nest-tunnels and adult birds were recorded across the catchment. Dippers were observed through the period of the study (2011-2015) across much of the catchment. Their absence was noted on a 2-kilometre stretch of the river which had been damaged by an aluminium flocculate leak discovered in 2014.

In 2016, a number of local students carried out a Young Scientist project on exploring the factors affecting the presence of the Freshwater Pearl Mussel (Margaritifera margaritifera) on the Allow River. The project results showed that the pearl mussel was present in this catchment and the distribution of the species was primarily dependent on substrate size and siltation, and pollution had a negative effect on the presence of this species. The freshwater Pearl Mussel is protected under Annex II and V of the EU Habitats Directive and under Schedule 1 of the Irish Wildlife Act and the European Communities (Natural Habitats) Regulations.

The IRD Duhallow RaptorLIFE project, which commenced in 2015, focused on conservation work based around four species: the Hen Harrier (Circus cyaneus), Merlin (Falco columbarius), Atlantic salmon (Salmo salar) and Brook lamprey (Lampetra planeri). This project included the catchment of the River Allow.

== IRD Duhallow ==
The IRD Duhallow LIFE SAMOK Programme was a conservation and restoration strategy for the protected and endangered species living in the Munster Blackwater SAC, including the River Allow. This project ran until 2015. The restoration and conservation work has continued in this area with the Duhallow Farming for Blue Dot EIP Project. This project formally finished in December 2023. It had involved approximately 100 local farmers, and had achieved improvements in 4 of the 18 river catchments included, while 13 more maintained good status.

== Fish kill ==
On Monday 10 June 2024, Inland Fisheries Ireland announced a significant fish kill had occurred in the River Allow, estimating approximately 5,000 fish had died. Fish species affected included juvenile Atlantic salmon, brown trout, lamprey, eel, stone loach, roach, and dace. Inland Fisheries Ireland, the State agency responsible for the protection and conservation of freshwater fish and habitats, opened an investigation into the cause of the fish kill. Uisce Éireann, which operates a water treatment plant in Freemount Co Cork, was reported to be investigating a possible chemical spillage at the plant which may be responsible for the fish kill. Preliminary investigations reported that approximately 2,500 liters of polyaluminium chloride were released from a burst pipe at the Uisce Éireann plant. Uisce Éireann announced at the time that they would fully cooperate with Inland Fisheries Ireland, and claimed that drinking water would not be impacted by the spill.

On 16 December 2024, in a legal case brought by Inland Fisheries Ireland at Mallow District Court, Uisce Éireann pleaded guilty to one pollution charge under the Fisheries (Consolidation) Act, 1959, of permitting or causing deleterious matter to fall into waters of the river. Two other charges were withdrawn. The spill was found to come from a large bulk tank (13 m^{3}) at Freemount water treatment plant, which contained polyaluminium chloride. This compound is used as a water clarification agent and is corrosive. The bulk tank was double-bunded with the required two layers of containment, however, the pipework had not been double-bunded and was damaged, resulting in a leak and a point source of water pollution. It was suggested that a valve malfunctioned, causing a buildup of heat at the pipe and its subsequent disintegration. A senior fisheries environmental officer with Inland Fisheries Ireland described the damage found at the site, including dark brown material at the spill site, wilting vegetation at the site, and severe damage to the respiratory systems of the fish. Fish found downriver were discoloured with degradation of their bodies and the river bed was found to be significantly discoloured. The officer estimated the death toll of the spill to be ten thousand fish, but was more likely to be tens of thousands of fish, as there were fish deaths noted up to 8 km downstream of the spill and including 40,000 m^{2} of river. It was noted that the staff of the water treatment plant made significant efforts to manage the spill once located. Storage of the polyaluminium chloride is now in two smaller bunded tanks on trays, and with security screening around them. Uisce Éireann has spent €100,000 on bunding equipment and €65,000 on the river clean-up. Information was communicated to Inland Fisheries Ireland and the Irish Environmental Protection Agency about the spill and clean-up. Uisce Éireann initiated a national chemical safety project as a response to the spill. Uisce Éireann were fined €3,500 with one month to pay and were ordered to pay legal costs amounting to €3,267.

== History ==
On his march from Dursey Island, after the Dursey Massacre in 1602, Donal Cam O'Sullivan Beare, Prince of Beare, 1st Count of Berehaven attempted to cross the River Allow on his 14-day journey with the remainder of his followers to meet Lord Tyrone at Lough Neagh. At the Ford of Bellaghan, John Barry, the brother of a Viscount Barry led forty footsoldiers and eight horsemen from Liscarroll Castle against the chieftain at the Allow River. From historical accounts, the site of the confrontation was likely to be at the ford of Bellaghan which is likely to be at or near John’s Bridge at Ballybahallagh. A Captain Cuffe was said to hold the ford with a superior force of Englishmen, according to at least one account. From these accounts, it is said that many of O’Sullivan Beare’s followers were wounded but only a small number were killed. From there, the O’Sullivan Beare group moved on to the Ballyhoura Mountains.

== See also ==
- Rivers of Ireland
- List of Special Areas of Conservation in the Republic of Ireland
