= N72 road =

N72 road may refer to:

- N72 road (Belgium)
- N72 road (Ireland)
