= R582 road (Ireland) =

Road in southwestern Ireland

Coordinates: 52.034205°N 9.070013°W

R582 road
- Bóthar R582
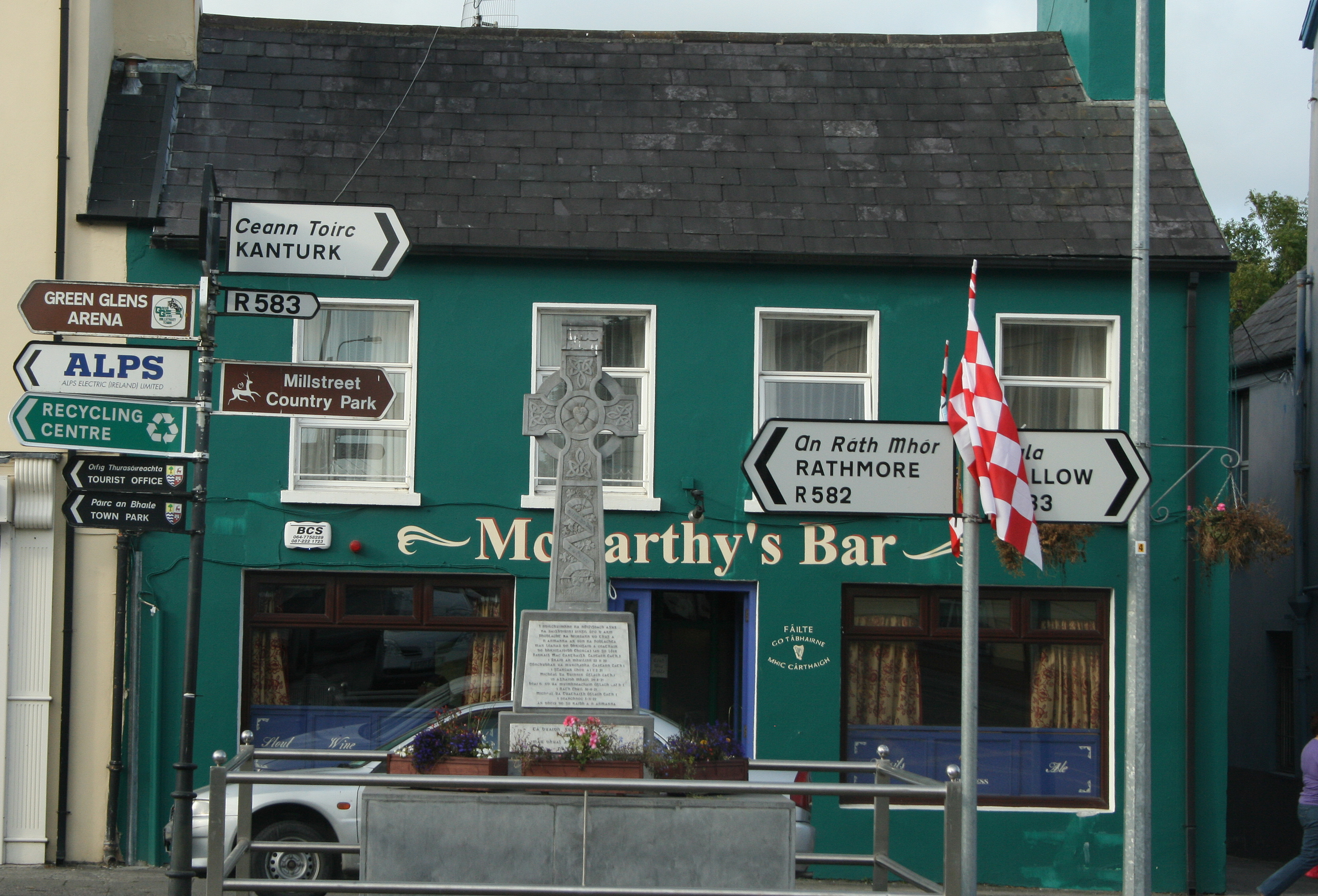
- Main Street, Millstreet, on the R582

Route information
- Length: 43.1 km (26.8 mi)

Major junctions
- From: R577 Ballydesmond
- Crosses Munster Blackwater (Nohaval Bridge) and enters County Kerry; N72 Rathmore; Reenters County Cork; R583 Millstreet
- To: N22 Macroom

Location
- Country: Ireland

Highway system
- Roads in Ireland; Motorways; Primary; Secondary; Regional

The R582 road is a regional road in Ireland, located in County Cork and County Kerry.
