= Freemount, County Cork =

Village in County Cork, Ireland

Coordinates: 52.277°N 8.885°W

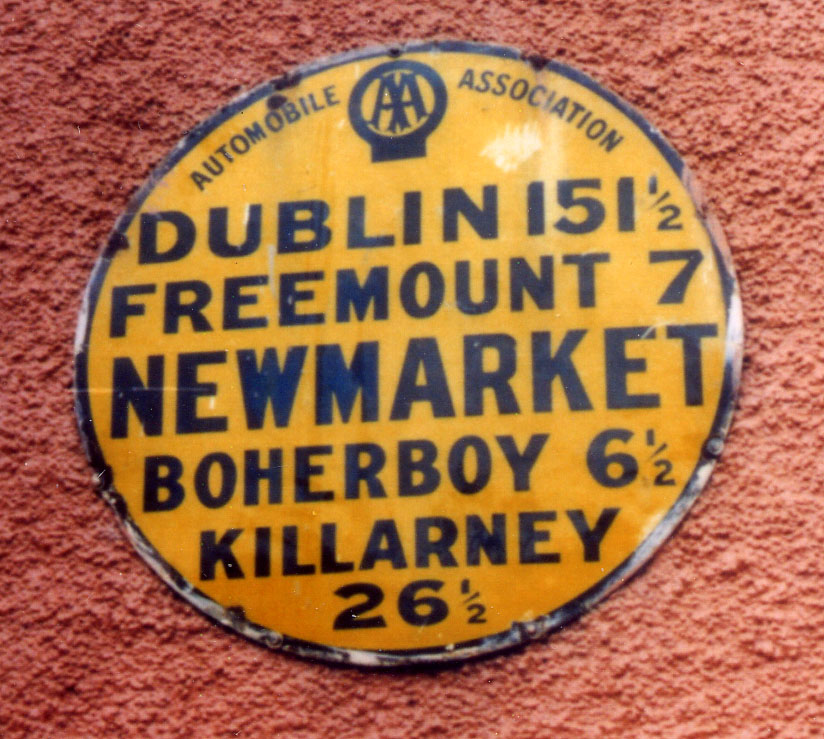
Old Automobile Association sign indicating the distance to Freemount from Newmarket, County Cork

Freemount (Irish: Cillín an Chrónáin, meaning 'small church of Crónán') is a village in County Cork in Ireland. It lies on the River Allow, which is crossed by Allow Bridge (dated 1834) on the R578 regional road. As of the 2022 census, Freemount village had a population of 257.

== History and name ==
The village and surrounding townland takes its original Irish name, Cillín an Chrónáin, from an early Christian church which was located on an earlier ringfort site.

The village's later English name, Freemount, was first recorded in the mid-18th century, and reputedly associated with the Freeman family of nearby Castlecor House. The Freeman family purchased Castlecor House, in neighbouring Kilbrin, in the early 18th century.

== Amenities ==
The Catholic church in the village is dedicated to Saint Michael and is in the Diocese of Cloyne. A plaque on the facade of the church is dated 1842.

The local Gaelic Athletic Association club, Freemount GAA, competes in the Duhallow division.

As of 2021, Freemount's national (primary) school had approximately 80 pupils enrolled.
