= R578 road (Ireland) =

Regional road in County Cork, Ireland

Coordinates: 52.317856°N 8.791836°W

R578 road
- Bóthar R578
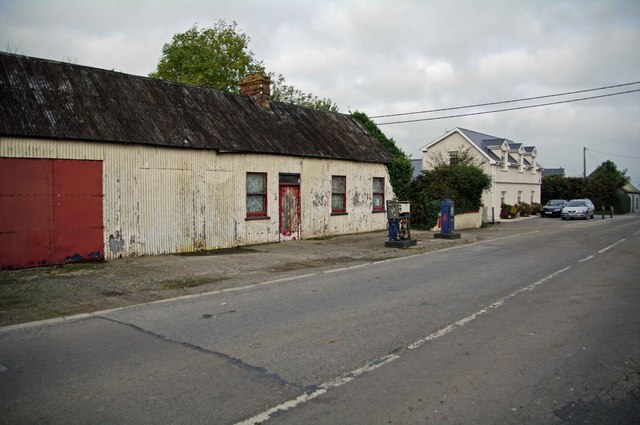
- R578 near Dromina, County Cork

Route information
- Length: 42.1 km (26.2 mi)

Major junctions
- From: R577 Ballydesmond
- R576 Newmarket; R579 Freemount; Crosses River Allow; R522 Aughrim
- To: R515 Newtown South (west of Charleville)

Location
- Country: Ireland

Highway system
- Roads in Ireland; Motorways; Primary; Secondary; Regional

The R578 road is a regional road in Ireland, located in County Cork.
