= R669 road (Ireland) =

Regional road in Ireland

R669 road
- Bóthar R669
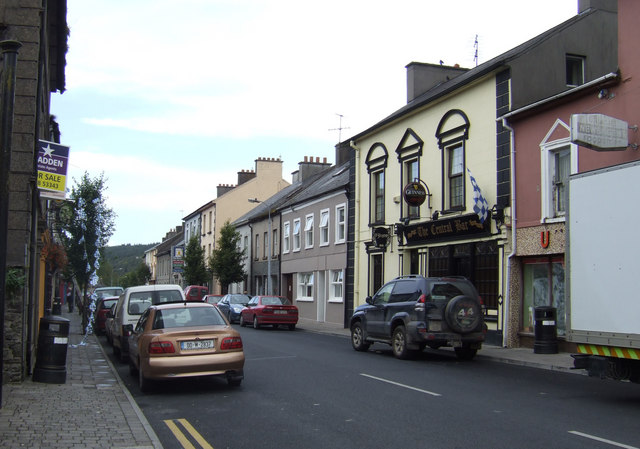
- Main Street, Cappoquin, on the R669

Route information
- Length: 13.8 km (8.6 mi)

Major junctions
- From: R668 at Glentanagree Bridge, County Waterford
- To: N72 at Cappoquin

Location
- Country: Ireland

Highway system
- Roads in Ireland; Motorways; Primary; Secondary; Regional
← R668	→ R670

The R669 road is a regional road in County Waterford, Ireland. It travels from the R668 road to Cappoquin. The road for Mount Melleray Abbey leaves the R669 at Boola. The R669 is 13.8 kilometres (8.6 mi) long.
