= R583 road (Ireland) =

Road in Ireland

R583 road
- Bóthar R583
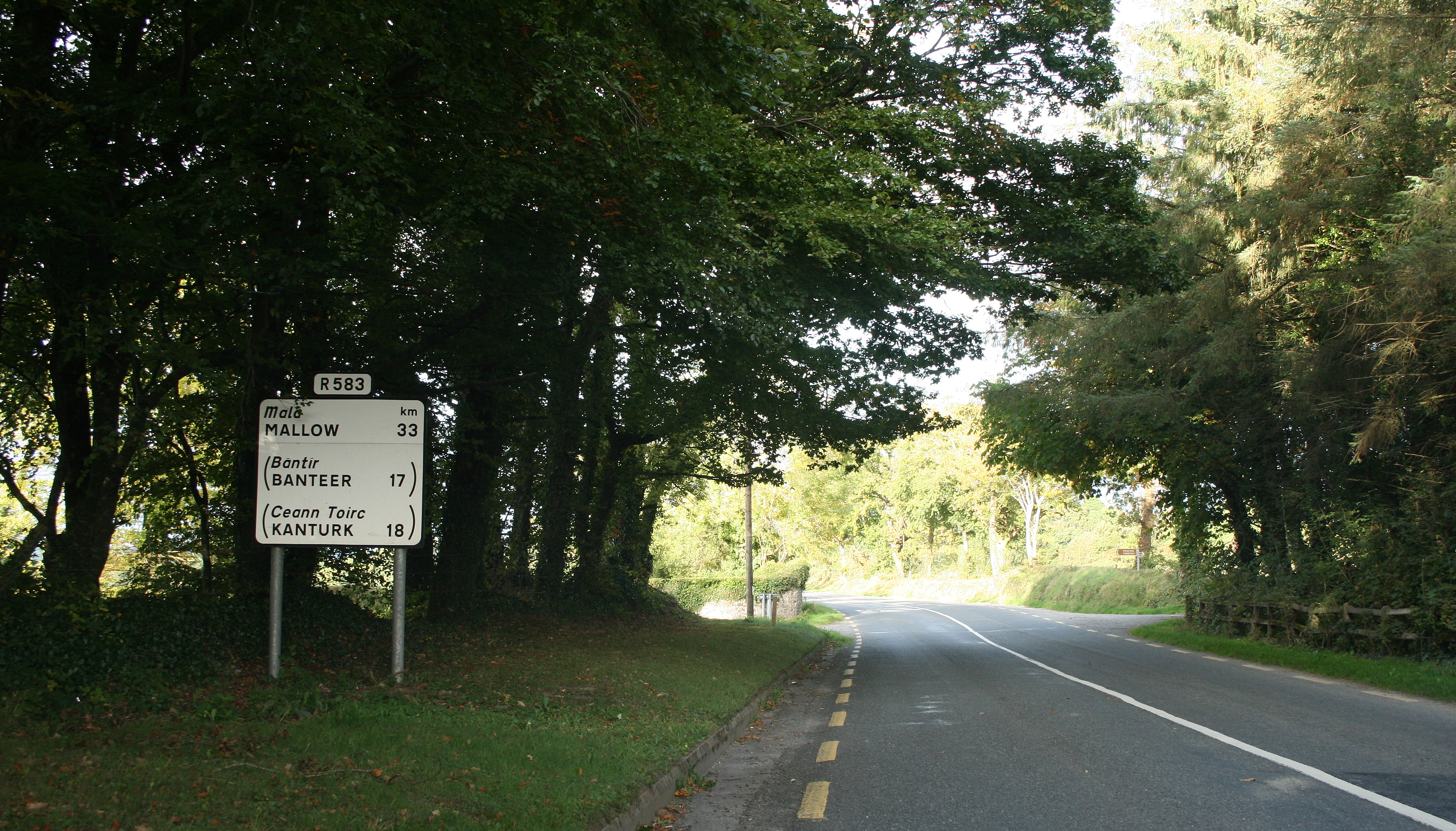
- R583 leaving Millstreet

Route information
- Length: 9 km (5.6 mi)

Location
- Country: Ireland
- Primary destinations: County Cork; Millstreet - leaves the R582; Crosses the Mallow to Killarney railway line; Crosses the Blackwater river; Terminates at the N72

Highway system
- Roads in Ireland; Motorways; Primary; Secondary; Regional

The R583 road is a regional road in Ireland in County Cork. It runs southwest to northeast from Millstreet to the N72 national secondary road between Mallow and Killarney. The road is 9 km long.

== See also ==
- Roads in Ireland
- National primary road
- National secondary road
