= Nora Herlihy =

Nora Herlihy

Nora Herlihy (1910–1988) was an Irish schoolteacher and one of the key founders of the credit union movement in Ireland.

== Early life and work as teacher ==
Nora Herlihy was born on 27 February 1910 in Ballydesmond, on the Cork-Kerry Border. She attended school in Newcastle West at the Sisters of Mercy Secondary School and trained to become a teacher at Carysfort College, graduating in 1931. She began teaching in Ferrybank and in 1936 was hired by the Irish Sisters of Charity school in Dublin. She was a national school teacher, educating in Dublin during the 1950s. As a teacher she observed the effects of poverty, unemployment and money-lending on her students and their families.

== Work as founder of credit unions ==
Herlihy was a student of the Liberal Arts Extramural Course at University College Dublin. There she met social economics student Tomas O'Hogain who invited her to a December 1953 meeting with Seamus MacEoin about the co-operative model. In March 1954 she and O'Hogain founded the Dublin Central Co-operative Society with the goal of reducing unemployment and emigration through the formation of worker co-operatives. The United States' Credit Union National Association (CUNA) asked Herlihy to form a subcommittee to examine how the credit union model could be put to use in Ireland. With Sean Forde and O'Hogain she formed the Credit Union Extension Service. In 1957, Minister for Industry and Commerce Seán Lemass appointed Herlihy to a legislative advisory committee on non-agricultural co-operatives. The first two Irish credit unions were formed under Herlihy's influence in 1958 and she promoted credit unions throughout Ireland. She was instrumental in the formation of the Civil Service Credit Union and the Irish League of Credit Unions, which was founded in 1960 and run from the living room of her Dublin house. She served as unpaid secretary for the organisation, teaching full-time and funding the movement's development with her earnings. In 1963 the board of the Credit Union League of Ireland recognized her as having made the greatest individual contribution to the Irish credit union movement. Her efforts aided the passage of the 1966 Credit Union Act and she stood beside President Éamon de Valera as he signed the act into law.

== Death and legacy ==
Nora Herlihy died on 7 February 1988, 28 years after the creation of the Irish League of Credit Unions. The Nora Herlihy Memorial Centre in Ballydesmond is named for her. The centre includes graphic panels depicting Herlihy's life. Herlihy's niece is RTÉ broadcaster Marian Finucane.
