= Kerry Co-operative Creameries =

Irish agricultural co-operative

Kerry Co-operative Creameries Limited
- Trade name: Kerry Co-op
- Type: Producer Co-operative
- Industry: Investments, Dairy Processing
- Founded: 1 January 1974
- Headquarters: Tralee, County Kerry, Ireland
- Website: kerryco-op.com

Kerry Co-Operative Creameries is an Irish agricultural co-operative society whose primary activity as of 2022 is the holding of investments on behalf of its farmer-members, with its largest investment being a 11.3% holding in Kerry Group.

== History ==
Kerry Co-op was originally formed through the amalgamation of a number of smaller dairy co-operatives in County Kerry and the purchase of assets of the state-owned Dairy Disposal Board in Kerry. The majority of the co-operatives dairy processing business was transferred to Kerry Group as part of its partial demutualisation with a significant number of shares issued to the co-operative in return.
