= R577 road (Ireland) =

Regional road in Ireland

R577 road
- Bóthar R577
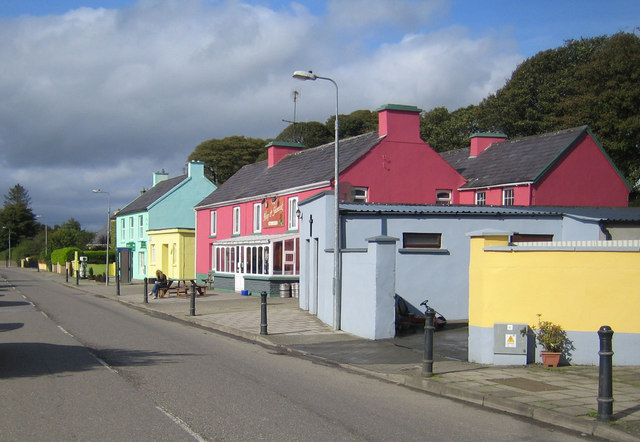
- Village of Kiskeam on the R577

Route information
- Length: 36.7 km (22.8 mi)

Major junctions
- From: N21 at Knockannagore, County Kerry
- Enter County Cork; R578 at Ballydesmond; R582 at Glencollins Lower
- To: N72 at Cloonbannin Cross, County Cork

Location
- Country: Ireland

Highway system
- Roads in Ireland; Motorways; Primary; Secondary; Regional
| ← R576 | → R578 |

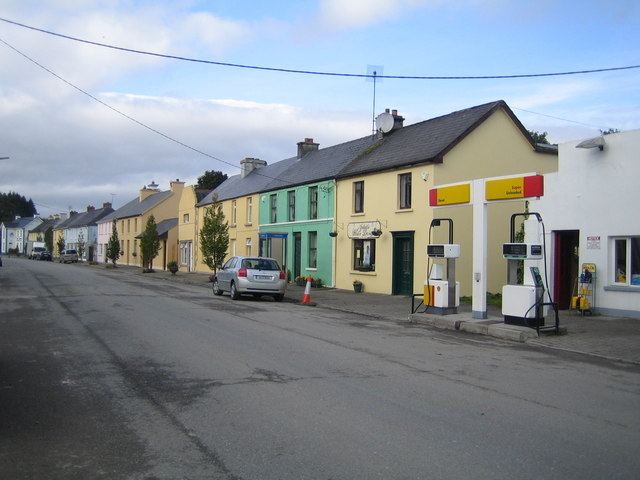
Main Street, Ballydesmond on the R577

The R577 road is a regional road in Ireland. It travels from the N21 road to the N72 road, via the town of Castleisland in County Kerry and the villages of Ballydesmond, Kiskeam and Boherbue in County Cork. The road is 36.7 kilometres (22.8 mi) long.
