= Kerry Group =

Irish food ingredients company

Kerry Group plc
- Type: Public limited company
- Traded as: Euronext Dublin: KRZ; LSE: KYGA; ISEQ 20 component
- ISIN: IE0004906560
- Founded: 1972; 54 years ago in Listowel, County Kerry, Ireland
- Headquarters: Tralee, County Kerry
- Key people: Fiona Dawson (Chair); Edmond Scanlon (CEO)
- Products: Food ingredients, flavours and enzymes
- Revenue: ▼€6,757.6 million (2025)
- Operating income: ▼€804.6 million (2025)
- Net income: ▼€658.8 million (2025)
- Total assets: ▼€10,669.1 million (2025)
- Total equity: ▼€5,953.6 million (2025)
- Number of employees: 19,000+ (2026)
- Website: kerry.com

Kerry Group plc is an Irish food ingredients company headquartered in Tralee, County Kerry. It supplies taste and nutrition ingredients to food, beverage and pharmaceutical manufacturers and is listed on Euronext Dublin and the London Stock Exchange. Following the sale of Kerry Dairy Ireland in 2024, the company focuses on its business-to-business taste and nutrition operations.

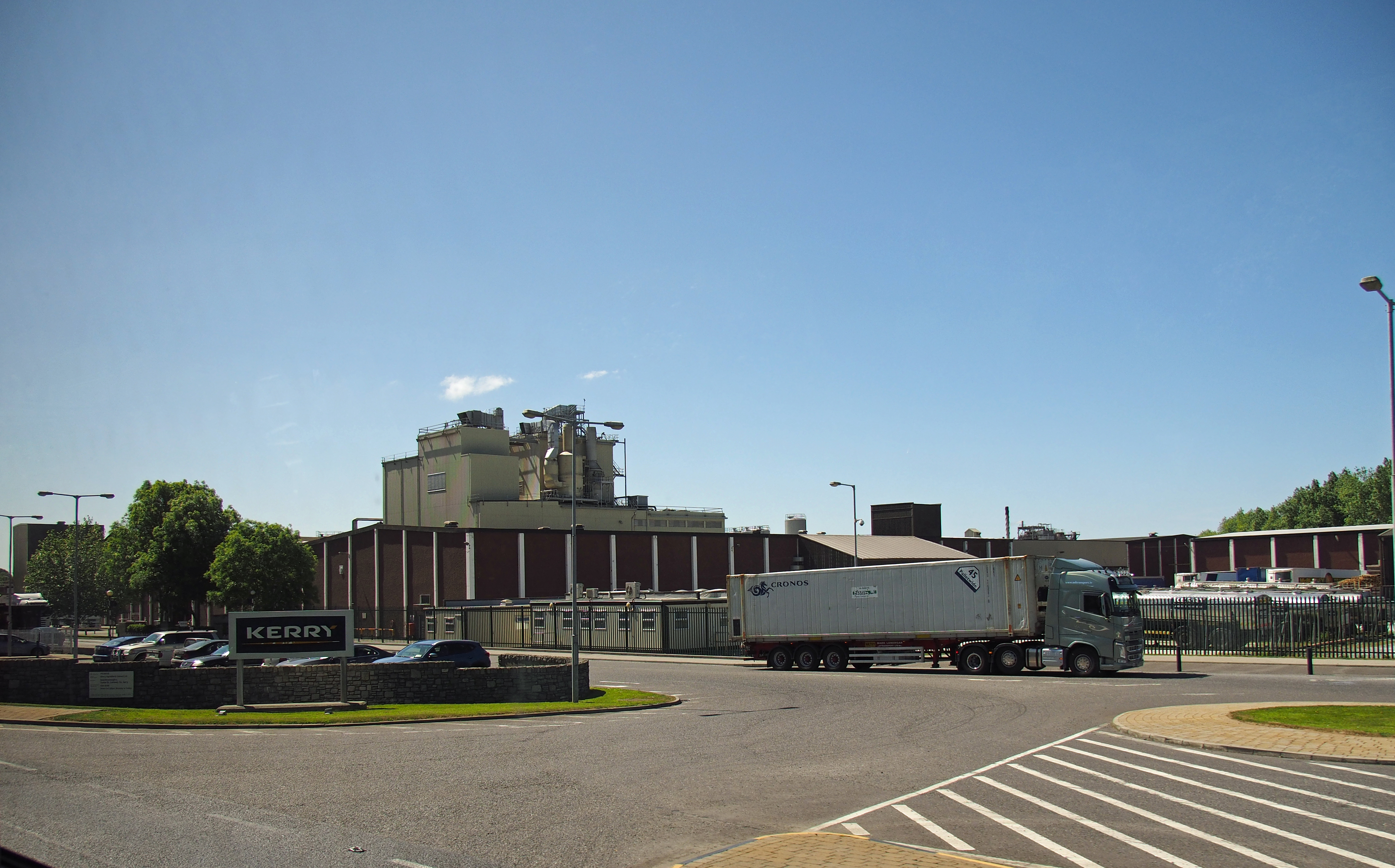
Kerry Group headquarters in Tralee

The company originated in the co-operative movement. Kerry Co-operative Creameries, which had held a substantial shareholding in Kerry Group, ceased to be a shareholder following the first phase of the sale of Kerry Dairy Ireland in December 2024.

== History ==
Kerry was founded in 1972 in Listowel, County Kerry as a private company (North Kerry Milk Products) with three shareholders – state-owned Dairy Disposal Company (42.5%), a federation of eight small farmer co-operatives in Kerry (42.5%) and Erie Casein Company Inc. from the US (15%).

In 1986, a significant milestone in the formation of the public limited company involved the group acquiring the undertaking, property and assets of Kerry Co-operative Creameries and as a consideration 90 million ordinary shares in Kerry Group plc being issued to the Co-op. It floated on the Irish Stock Exchange at a price of 52p per share.

Kerry Group has a long history of acquisitions. In 1982, the company acquired pork manufacturer Duffy Meats and Henry Denny & Sons. In 1988, it acquired Beatreme Food Ingredients, a division of the Beatrice Corporation for $130m. In 2000, it acquired Shade Foods Inc, a US sweet ingredients provider for US$80 million, Armor Foods, a savory flavorings company for US$35 million and Solnuts, a provider of value-added soy-based nutritional ingredients.

In March 2004, the company bought the Food Ingredients division of Quest International, for US$440 million. Then in August 2005, the company acquired Noon Products, a supplier of Indian and Thai ready meals, for £124m.

In September 2012, the company acquired Cargill Flavor Systems, a manufacturer of food flavouring, for $230 million.

In February 2015, the company acquired Rollover, a supplier of hot dogs. Then in October 2015, the company acquired Red Arrow Products, Island Oasis and Wellmune, three businesses in the US taste and nutrition sector, for US$735 million.

In 2021, Kerry was on the list of Industry Outlook's Top 10 Food Additive Manufacturers, in addition to being ranked second on the Top 20 Global Food Preservative Companies list by FoodTalks, a Chinese food media platform.

In April 2021, Kerry announced plans to invest approximately €30 million in a taste manufacturing facility in Karawang, West Java, Indonesia. The 50,000 m² facility opened in June 2023 and comprises a manufacturing plant, a research and development pilot plant, and a sampling hub. In April 2025, Kerry opened its first taste manufacturing facility in Kigali, Rwanda. The company had previously established a technology and innovation centre in Kenya in 2018.

In June 2021, Pilgrim's Pride agreed to buy Kerry Group's consumer foods in the meat and meals business. In June 2021, Kerry Group also agreed to acquire Niacet for the value of €853 million.

In July 2021, the company acquired Biosearch Life, a biotechnology company focused on the pharmaceutical, nutraceutical and functional food sectors.

In February 2022, the organisation announced two acquisitions: c-LEcta, a biotechnology company, and Enmex, a Mexican-based enzyme manufacturer.

In April 2022, Kerry Group acquired Natreon, Inc, a US based supplier of branded Ayurvedic botanical ingredients.

In August 2022, Kerry Group acquired the B2B powdered cheese business and related assets of The Kraft Heinz Company for consideration of $107.5 million.

In January 2023, IRCA, Advent International's portfolio company, agreed to buy Kerry Group's Sweet Ingredients Portfolio for €500 million.

In December 2023, the company acquired the lactase enzyme business of Danish companies Chr. Hansen and Novozymes for €150 million.

In November 2024, Kerry acquired the LactoSens biosensor platform from the Austrian company DirectSens. The technology is used to detect lactose in dairy products and verify low-lactose and lactose-free product claims.

In November 2024, Kerry Group agreed to sell Kerry Dairy Ireland, its Irish consumer dairy products and dairy ingredients business, to Kerry Co-operative Creameries on the basis of an enterprise value of approximately €500 million. Under the agreement, the Co-op acquired an initial 70 per cent interest for €350 million. Kerry Group shareholders approved the transaction later that month, and its first phase was completed on 31 December 2024. Following completion of the first phase of the transaction, Kerry Dairy Ireland was treated as a discontinued operation in Kerry Group's 2024 financial results. In May 2026, the business was renamed Kinisla as part of a rebranding announced alongside a €300 million five-year investment programme.

== Operations ==
Kerry Group is headquartered in Tralee, County Kerry, and supplies taste and nutrition ingredients to the food, beverage and pharmaceutical industries. The company operates manufacturing facilities, customer innovation centres and biotechnology research centres across multiple regions, including its Global Innovation Centre in Naas, County Kildare. In February 2025, Kerry announced a digital centre of excellence at its Global Innovation Centre in Naas, County Kildare, focused on digital initiatives across operations, research and development, commercial activities and global business services.

=== Pharmaceutical and life science ingredients ===
Kerry produces cell culture media supplements, pharmaceutical excipients and acetates for the pharmaceutical and biotechnology industries. The company's cell nutrition products include protein hydrolysates, yeast extracts, recombinant proteins and chemically defined media used in cell culture, vaccine production, microbial fermentation and diagnostics. In 2012, the company expanded its cell science laboratory in Beloit, Wisconsin. In 2019, Kerry began a research collaboration with Ireland's National Institute for Bioprocessing Research and Training (NIBRT) on the characterisation of protein hydrolysates used in the manufacture of therapeutic proteins.

Kerry owns Niacet, a producer of propionates and acetates for the food, feed and pharmaceutical industries, with manufacturing facilities in Niagara Falls, New York, and Tiel, the Netherlands. FoodNavigator reported that the acquisition added pharmaceutical-grade acetates used in the manufacture of insulin, dialysate and phosphate binders to Kerry's existing range of cell culture media and pharmaceutical excipients.

=== Biotechnology and fermentation ===
Kerry owns biotechnology companies including the Mexican enzyme manufacturer Enmex and the Leipzig-based enzyme engineering and precision fermentation company c-LEcta, which was founded in 2004 as a spin-out from Leipzig University.

== Business structure ==
Kerry Group reports its continuing taste and nutrition operations through three geographic segments: Europe, the Americas and Asia-Pacific, Middle East and Africa (APMEA). These operations supply ingredients and related products to the food, beverage and pharmaceutical markets.

== Corporate governance ==
Edmond Scanlon has served as chief executive officer since October 2017, and Marguerite Larkin as chief financial officer since September 2018. Philip Toomey chaired the board from 2018 until 2022, when he was succeeded by Tom Moran. Fiona Dawson became chair following Moran's retirement at the company's annual general meeting on 30 April 2026.

== Brands ==
Brands of the Kerry Group include:

- Big Train
- Island Oasis
- DaVinci Gourmet
- Golden Dipt

== See also ==
- List of companies of Ireland
