= Cappoquin =

Town in County Waterford, Ireland

Cappoquin Ceapach Choinn
- Town
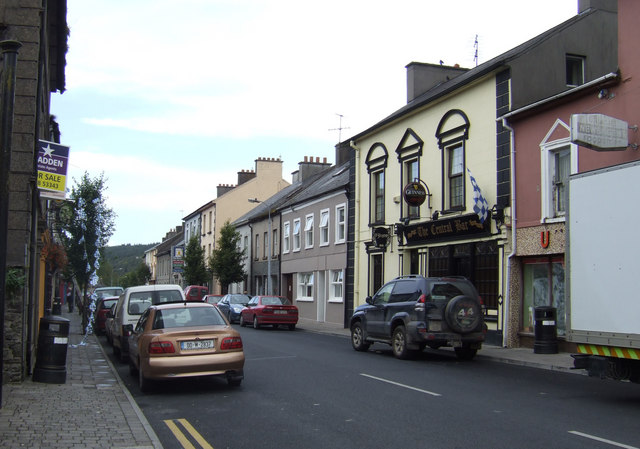
- Main Street

- Location in Ireland
- Coordinates: 52°09′N 7°51′W
- Country: Ireland
- Province: Munster
- County: Waterford

Population (2022)
  - Total: 778
- Time zone: UTC+0 (WET)
  - Summer (DST): UTC-1 (IST (WEST))

Cappoquin (Irish: Ceapach Choinn, meaning 'tillage-plot of Conn'), also sometimes spelt Cappaquin, is a town in western County Waterford, Ireland. It is on the Blackwater river at the junction of the N72 national secondary road and the R669 regional road. It is positioned on a sharp 90-degree bend in the river and lies at the foot of the Knockmealdown Mountains. The town is a few miles from Mount Melleray and Lismore, County Waterford.

== Name ==
Cappoquin is an Anglicisation of the Irish Ceapach Choinn, referring to a plot of land (or tillage plot) associated with a person named Conn. According to historian Patrick Weston Joyce, "no one can tell who this Conn was". Variant English spellings include Cappaquin or Capaquin and, in some older texts, Caperquin.

== History ==
Historical population
Year	Pop.	±%
1821	1,826	—
1831	2,289	+25.4%
1841	2,341	+2.3%
1851	2,144	−8.4%
1861	1,774	−17.3%
1871	1,526	−14.0%
1881	1,555	+1.9%
1891	1,366	−12.2%
1901	1,214	−11.1%
1911	1,069	−11.9%
1926	1,012	−5.3%
1936	1,038	+2.6%
1946	912	−12.1%
1951	826	−9.4%
1956	758	−8.2%
1961	806	+6.3%
1966	785	−2.6%
1971	872	+11.1%
1981	950	+8.9%
1986	920	−3.2%
1991	829	−9.9%
1996	780	−5.9%
2002	756	−3.1%
2006	740	−2.1%
2011	759	+2.6%
2016	699	−7.9%
2022	778	+11.3%

Evidence of Mesolithic settlement in the area was discovered during an archaeological dig, at nearby Lefanta, during the 1980s. Ancient fortifications in the area include ringforts in the neighbouring Lyre East and Fadduaga townlands, and records of a former medieval castle within Cappoquin Demesne.

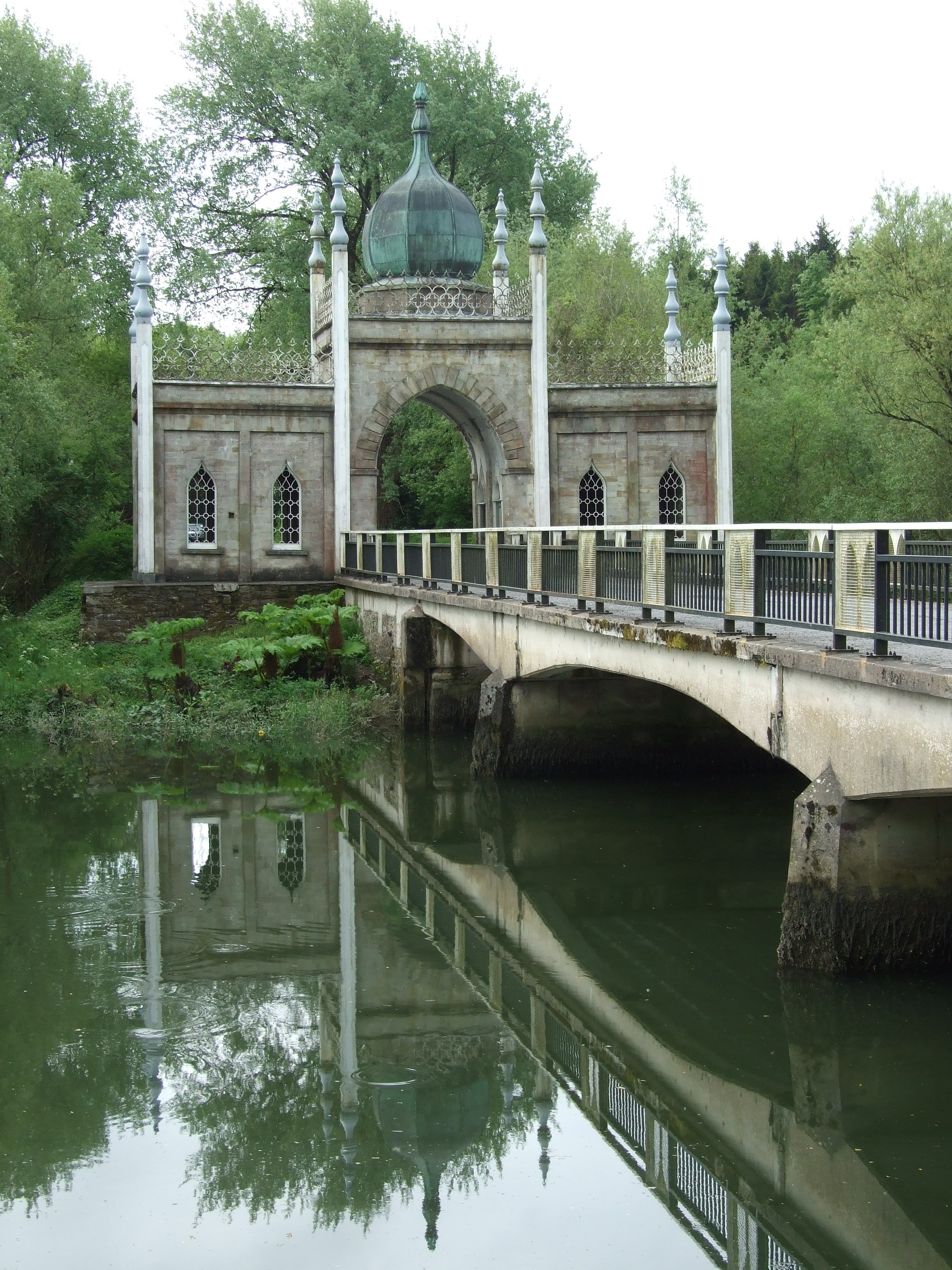
Dromana House gate lodge

Outside the town is Cappoquin House, which was built in the 1770s on the site of an earlier Fitzgerald castle. It overlooks the town, and has formal gardens and landscaped grounds which are open to the public. The 18th century Dromana House, and its elaborate gate lodge, are also located near Cappoquin. Cappoquin Market House, within the town, was built c.1775 as a three bay market house. It is now used as a shop.

In September 1849, a number of local members of the Young Ireland movement led an unsuccessful attack against the constabulary barracks in Cappoquin.

== Economy ==
Within the town's centre, employers include a number of shops and businesses, including a supermarket, pharmacy, post office and credit union.

Some of the largest individual local employers are located on the Cappoquin industrial estate, located a half mile into adjoining Lefanta.

Being surrounded by fertile fields on all sides, farming and agriculture play a role in the town, providing employment on the farms and orchards in the area. Near Cappoquin is West Waterford Vineyards, an Irish wine producer.

The town has suffered with the decline in the local economy and the loss of both Cappoquin pork and bacon as well as Cappoquin chickens as well as local shops and secondary school.

== Sport ==
Affane Cappoquin GAA is the local Gaelic Athletic Association club. Formed in 1969, with the merging of Affane GAA and Cappoquin GAA, the team won its only Waterford Senior Football Championship title in 1974. Affane went on to represent Waterford in the Munster Senior Club Football Championship, losing to Austin Stacks of Kerry.

Cappoquin Rowing Club is the town's oldest sporting and social organisation, and was founded in 1862 by James M. Moore and John Stanley. They were assisted by Sir John H. Keane who became the first president of the rowing club, and who had previously captained the Trinity Boat at Cambridge and rowed for Cambridge in 1936 when they defeated Oxford. In the 1880s Cappoquin joined with other rowing clubs nationwide to establish the Irish Amateur Rowing Association.

Railway Athletic FC was founded in 1980 and is situated at Danes Field, Cappoquin. Jayson Molumby, who later went on to play with Brighton & Hove Albion F.C. and the Republic of Ireland national football team, formerly played for Railway Athletic FC.

== Transport ==
=== Bus services ===
Since December 2015 there have been improvements to the frequency of the Local Link (formerly known as Déise Link) bus service. There are now four services a day each way Mondays to Saturdays inclusive to Dungarvan including a commuter service. Connections to Waterford and Rosslare Europort can be made at Dungarvan. In the other direction there are four services to and from Tallow via Lismore. Connections for Fermoy can be made at Tallow. On Saturdays, a local bus company operate a service to Cork. On Sundays, Bus Éireann route 366 provides one service to Dungarvan and Waterford. This route only operates on Sundays and comprises a single journey in one direction (no return service on any day of the week).

=== Rail ===
Cappoquin railway station opened on 12 August 1878, but closed on 27 March 1967. It was located on the now dismantled Waterford to Mallow line and served by the Cork to Rosslare boat train.

The construction of the railway bridge below the river bend was to result in tall-masted schooners being no longer able to pass under what was now known as the 'red bridge'. As compensation for this, a new "steamers' quay" was constructed just downriver.

The station is still extant.

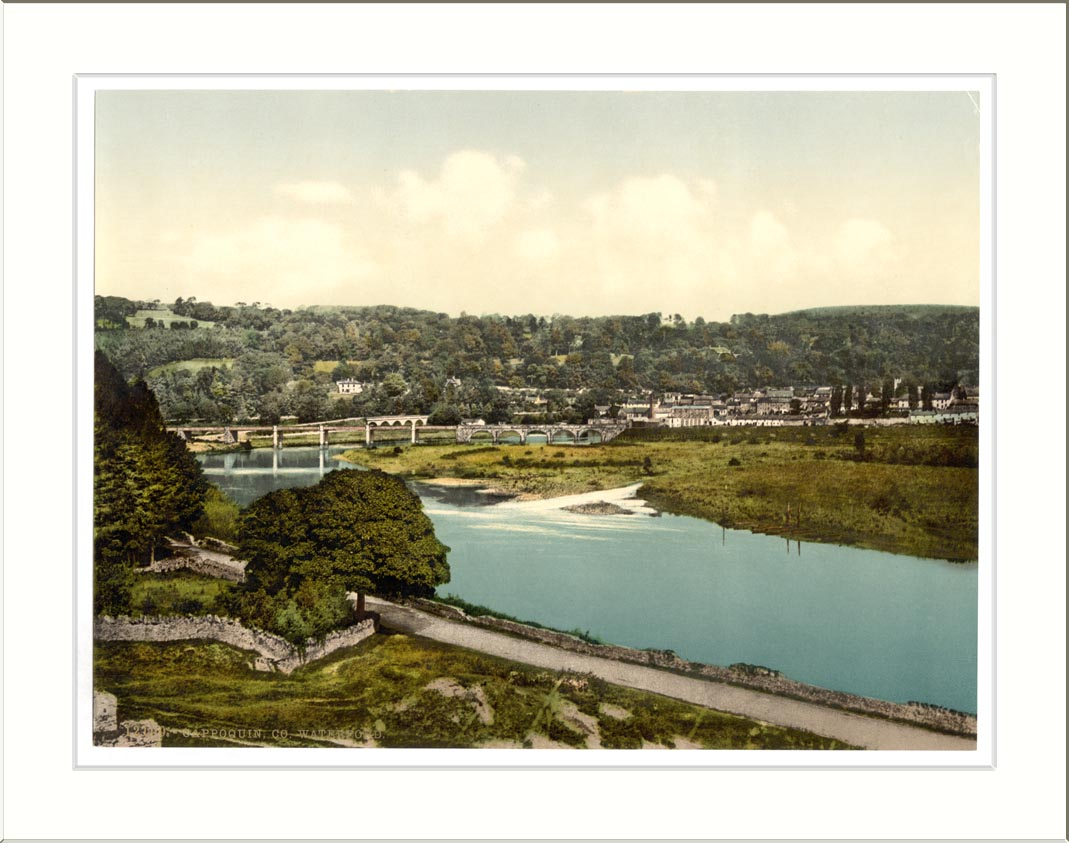
View of Cappoquin and the Blackwater River

== Twinning ==
Cappoquin is twinned with Chanat-la-Mouteyre in France.

== Notable people ==
- Jayson Molumby, professional footballer
- Thomas McCarthy, poet, was born in Cappoquin.
- Kate Baker, teacher and literary guardian of the works of Joseph Furphy, was born in Cappoquin.

== See also ==
- List of towns in the Republic of Ireland
- Market Houses in the Republic of Ireland
