= R666 road (Ireland) =

Road in Ireland

R666 road
- Bóthar R666
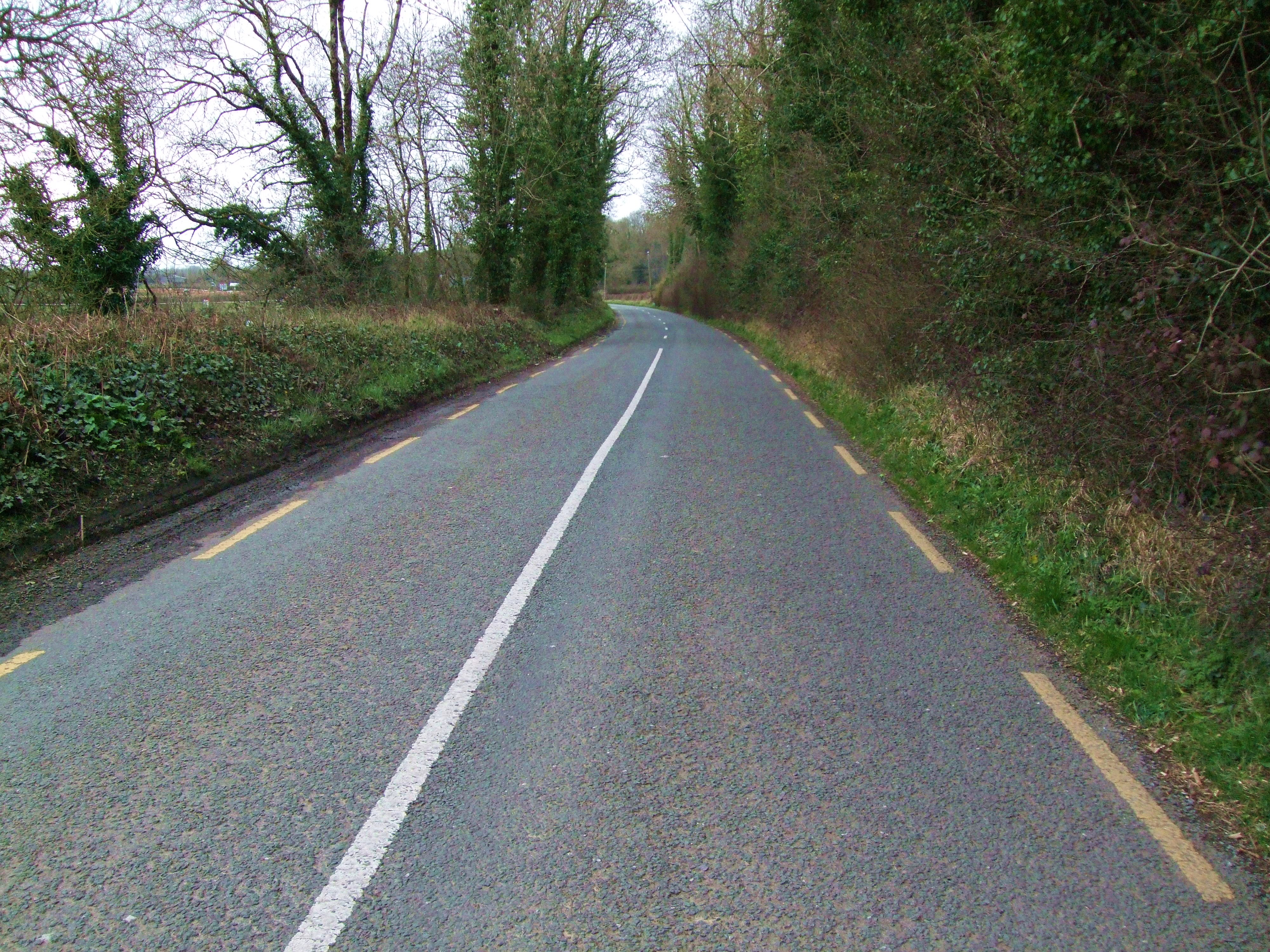
- The R666 between Ballyduff and Fermoy

Route information
- Length: 28 km (17 mi)

Location
- Country: Ireland
- Primary destinations: County Cork; Fermoy; Passes under the M8; County Waterford; Ballyduff; Lismore

Highway system
- Roads in Ireland; Motorways; Primary; Secondary; Regional

The R666 road is a regional road in Ireland which runs west-east from the R639 in Fermoy town centre to the bridge over the River Blackwater on the outskirts of Lismore. The road passes through Ballyduff, and beneath the River Blackwater viaduct which carries the M8 motorway. The R666 begins in Fermoy as the Rathhealy Road. From here to its merger with the R667 road 3km south of Kilworth, the R666 was once part of the historic road linking Dublin and Cork. It was mapped as such by Herman Moll in his 1714 New Map of Ireland.

The route is 28 km (17 mi) long.

Locally, the road is sometimes humorously known as the road to hell from its name being the same as the Number of the Beast.

== See also ==
- Roads in Ireland
- Motorways in Ireland
- National primary road
- National secondary road
- History of roads in Ireland
