= Irish League of Credit Unions =

Irish trade association

Coordinates: 53.338163°N 6.242885°W

- Headquarters: 33-41 Lower Mount Street, Dublin 2, Ireland
- President: Martin Busch
- Vice-President: Margaret Heffernan
- Treasurer: Joe Mulvey
- Chief Executive Officer: David Malone
- Board of directors: Martin Busch, Margaret Heffernan, Joe Mulvey, Michael Byrne, Martin Dolan, Vanessa Foran, Geraldine Gilsenan, Colm Lawless, David McAuley, Helene McManus, Eamonn Sharkey, Patrick Sheehan, Jim Toner
- Website: https://www.creditunion.ie/

The Irish League of Credit Unions (ILCU) (Irish: Conradh na hÉireann de Chomhair Chreidmheasa) is a trade association for credit unions in Ireland. It operates in both the Republic of Ireland and Northern Ireland. It is an unincorporated body governed by a board of directors elected by member credit unions.

== History ==
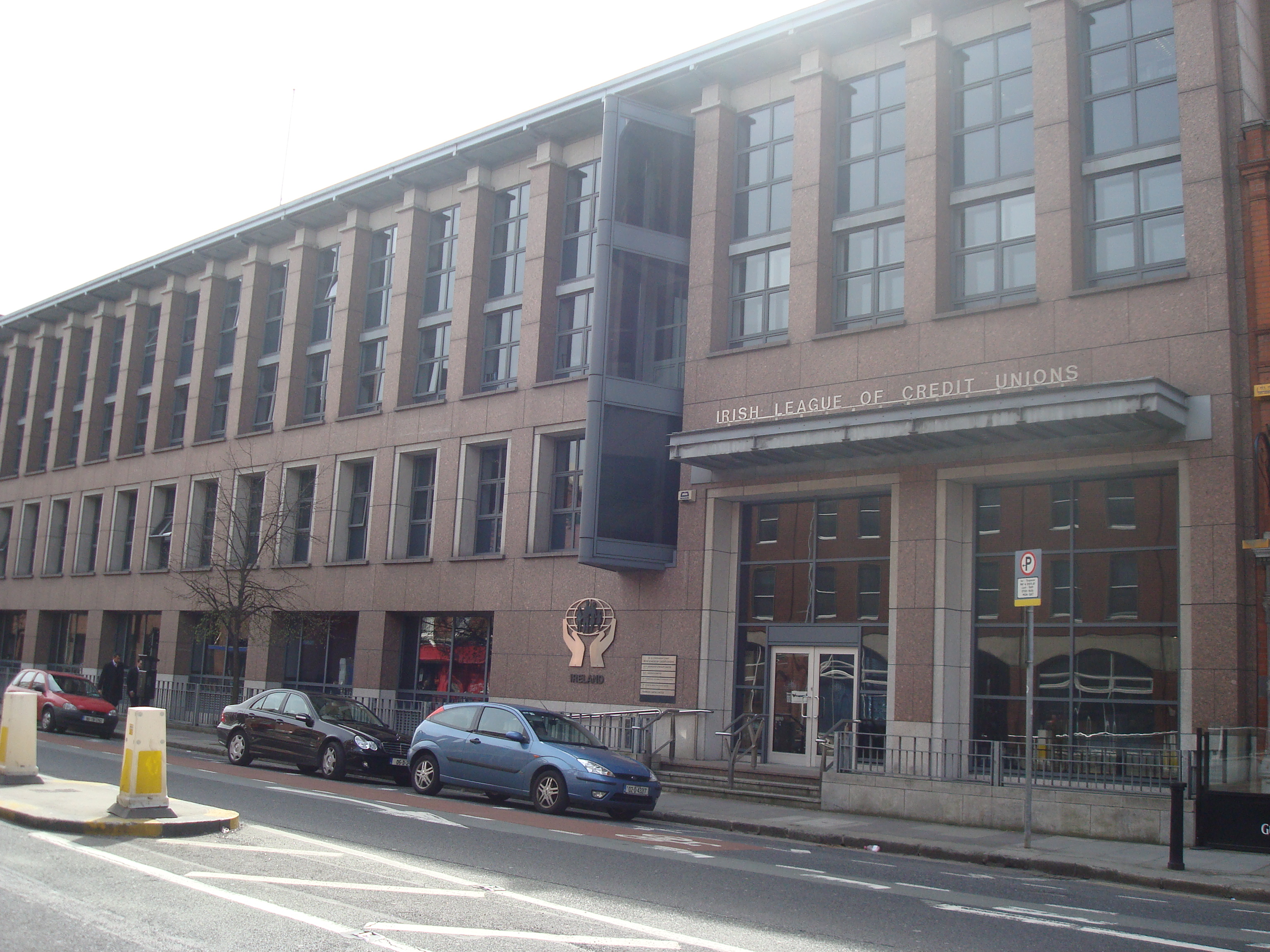
Irish League of Credit Unions building on Lower Mount Street, Dublin

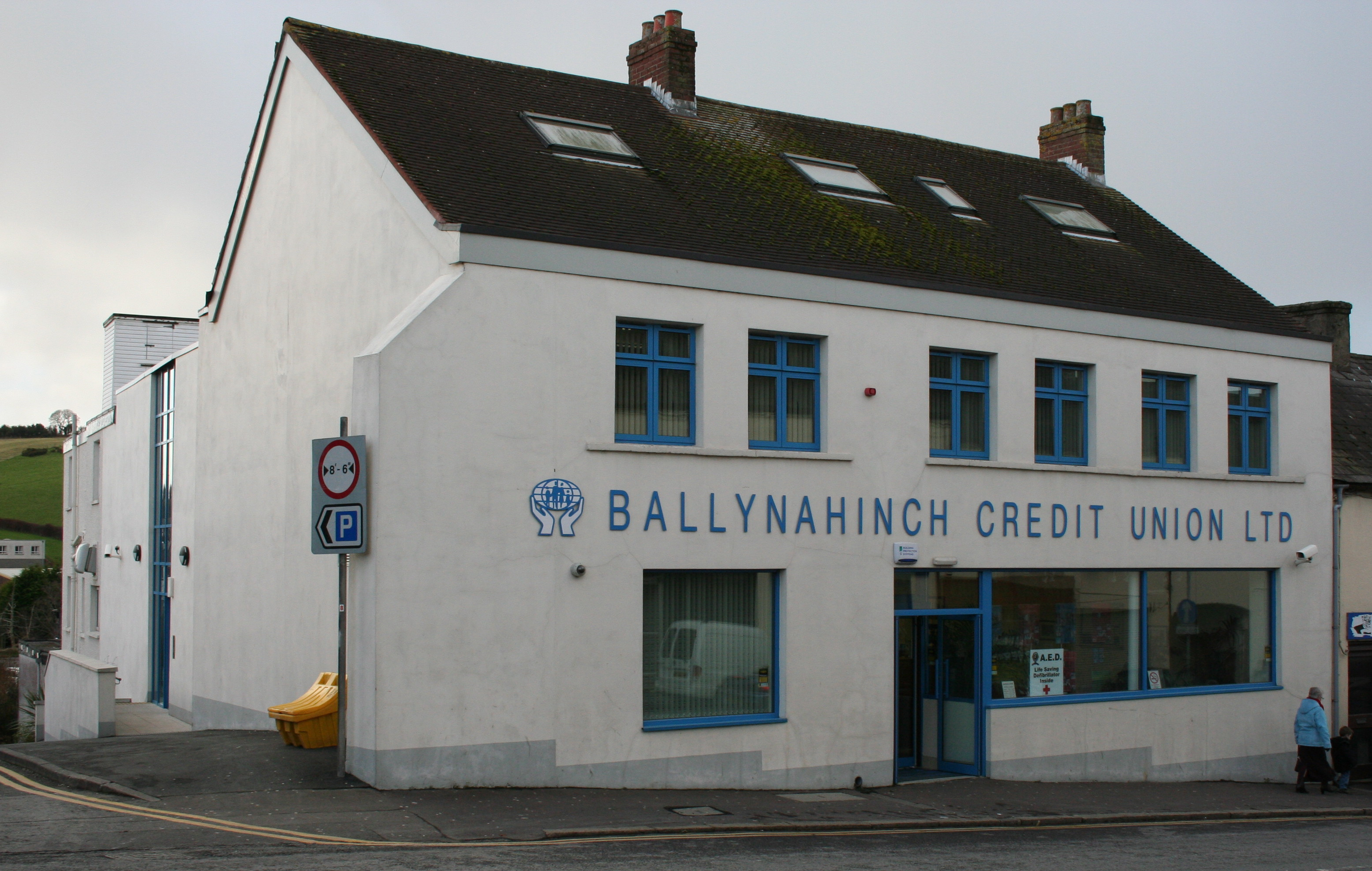
Ballynahinch Credit Union, County Down, Northern Ireland

The Credit Union movement in Ireland arose out of the Dublin Central Cooperative Society, which was formed in 1952 with the following office holders: Chairman: Thomas Hogan; Secretary: Seamus McEoin, a civil servant; and Treasurer: Eugene O'Riordan, an engineer and native of Macroom, County Cork. The aims and objectives were to promote industry to create jobs.

In 1954 the chairman, Thomas Hogan, died and in the ensuing officer shuffle Seamus McEoin became chairman. Eugene O'Riordan remained as the treasurer and Nora Herlihy, a National School teacher from Ballydesmond, who had recently joined the society, was elected Secretary.

Eugene O'Riordan set up the Dublin Central Co-op investment bank to provide capital for industrial development. A surge of support for the investment bank from America, Britain and the Continent resulted in the secretary becoming fearful of the capacity of the society to handle an investment bank and she proposed that it be discontinued. This was a bitter disappointment for Eugene O'Riordan in particular as it was obvious to him that a chord was struck with the Irish diaspora who wanted to help. He felt that the prospects were enormous, especially after a letter in the Catholic Universe brought astonishing results with strong support internationally.

Nora Herlihy then obtained literature on the credit union movement from an acquaintance in America and proposed the adoption of the credit union model instead of the investment bank model for the purpose of getting capital for industrial development.

With the exception of Eugene O'Riordan, the society decided to establish a Credit Union. The credit union movement thus started, and that was the end for the Dublin central co-operative society and the Emergent Investment Bank. The credit union movement became a great success in its own right although it was felt that there was still a gap in terms of supporting industry, as the credit unions could not be a means of obtaining and dispersing venture capital. At that stage Seán Forde, an employee at a Dublin bakery, played an important role in the movement.

The economy of the Republic was depressed, urban poverty and emigration were increasing, and the credit union movement was envisaged as a way to help working-class people manage their finances.

The Irish League of Credit Unions (ILCU) was established in 1960.

== Functions ==
The ILCU represents credit unions in social partnership negotiations and lobbying national governments and European Union bodies. It does marketing and research and development. It provides services for members, including legal advice, secretarial service, human resources, information technology, training, and business services. It also takes responsibility for savings protection and monitoring and supervision of member unions.

== Board of Directors & Supervisory Committee ==
The Board of Directors is elected every two years, by means of a postal ballot of member Credit Unions in advance of the AGM. Each member Credit Union has two votes and the election of the Board is conducted in accordance with PR-STV. Following the election of a Board, the Directors-Elect take their seats on the Board at the conclusion of the AGM. Every two years at the ILCU Annual General Meeting, affiliated credit unions elect the Officers for the Board of Directors and members of the Supervisory Committee. Working through the CEO and the Senior Management Team, the Board responds to the needs of the affiliated credit unions during their term of office. The 2023-25 ILCU Board and Supervisory Committee are:

=== Board of Directors ===
Martin Busch, President	Office of President
Margaret Heffernan	Office of Vice-President
Joe Mulvey	Office of Treasurer
Michael Byrne	Director
Martin Dolan	Director
Vanessa Foran	Director
Geraldine Gilsenan	Director
Colm Lawless	Director
David McAuley	Director
Helene McManus	Director
Eamonn Sharkey	Director
Patrick Sheehan	Director
Jim Toner	Director

=== Supervisory Committee ===
Patricia Doherty	Committee Supervisor
Seamus Kilgannon	Committee Supervisor
Joan Jennings	Committee Supervisor

== Regulation ==
Each credit union is an autonomous organisation and manages its own affairs. In the Republic of Ireland, the Central Bank of Ireland has overall responsibility for credit unions, in order to protect members’ funds and maintain the financial stability and well-being of credit unions in general. The League, in response to the consolidation of the sector, has accused the Central Bank of acting beyond its statutory powers and has warned the Central Bank against trying “to scare the public or exaggerate risk for the sake of achieving unarticulated policy objectives." The cost to the State of the proposed rationalisation was expected to be in the region of €250 million.

A separate Registrar of Credit Unions for Northern Ireland regulates ILCU members in that jurisdiction.

== See also ==
- List of European cooperative banks
- List of banks in the Republic of Ireland
