= R667 road (Ireland) =

Road in Ireland

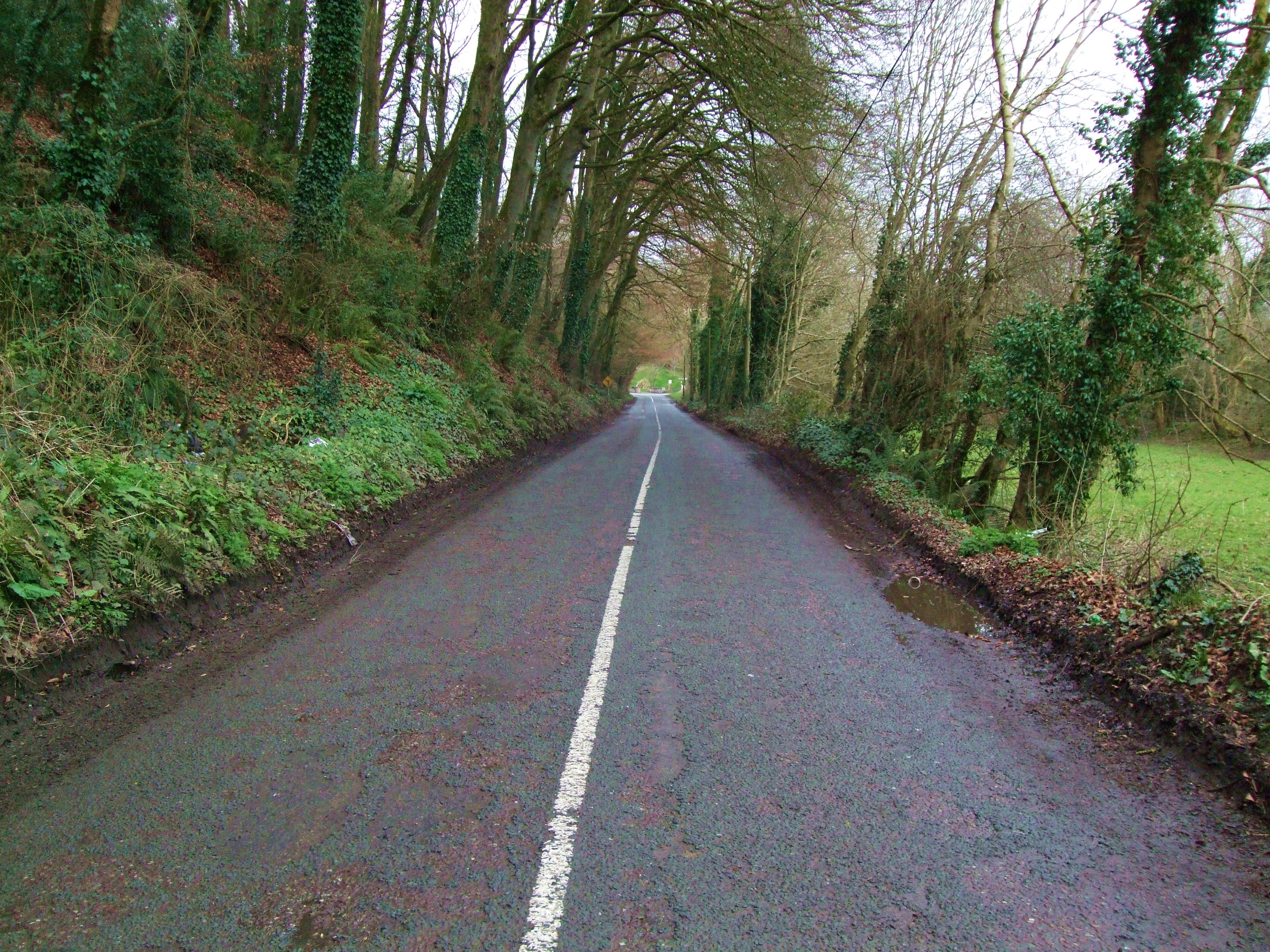
The R667 between Fermoy and Kilworth.

The R667 road is a regional road in Ireland. The route runs from its junction with the N8 1 km from Kilworth for approximately 5 km until it meets the R666 road northeast of Fermoy. The R667 was once part of the main road from Dublin to Cork, and was mapped as such by Herman Moll in his New Map of Ireland in 1714. The road is located entirely in County Cork.

== See also ==
- Roads in Ireland
- Motorways in Ireland
- National primary road
- National secondary road
- History of roads in Ireland
