= N72 road (Ireland) =

Road in Ireland

N72 road
- Bóthar N72
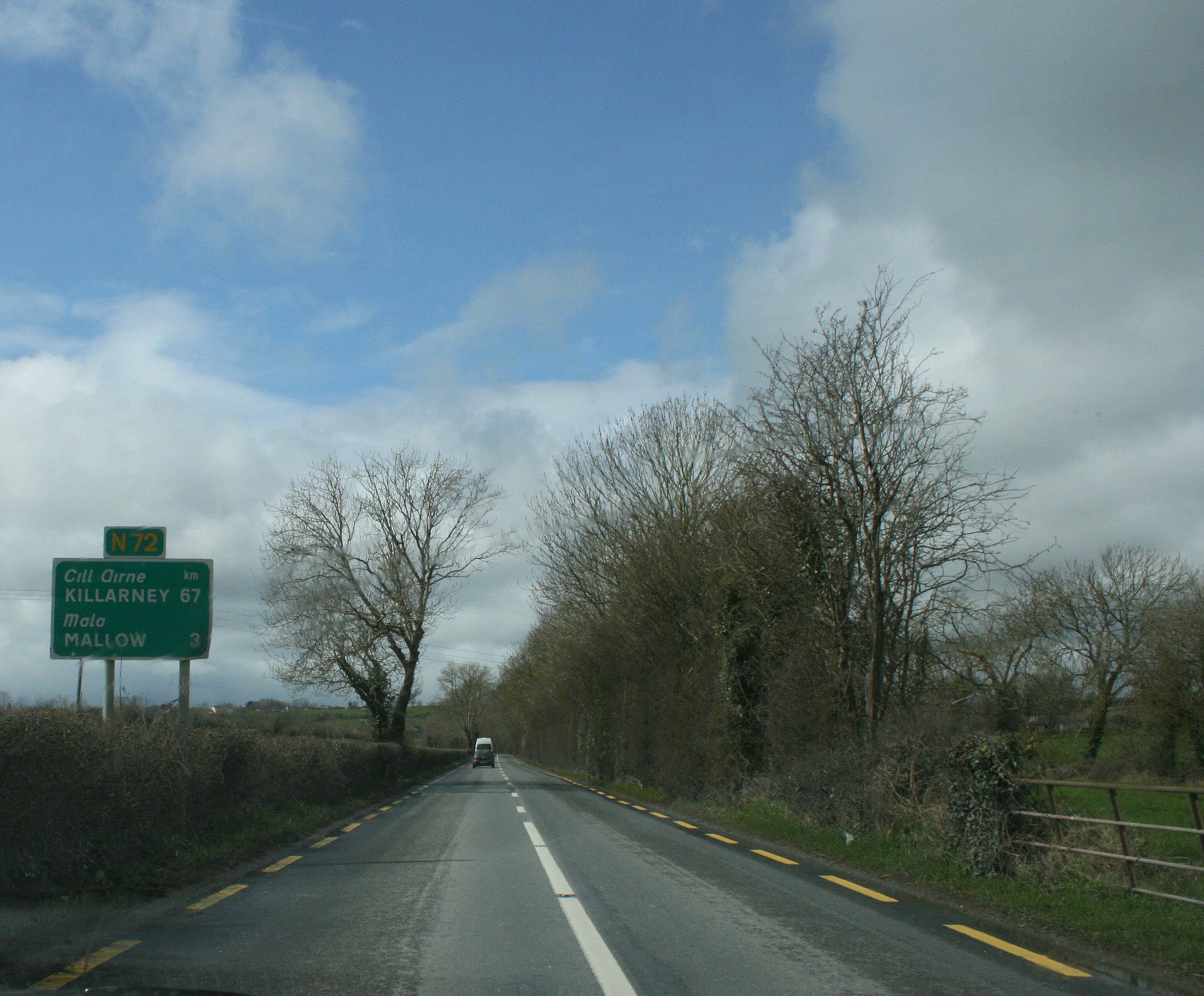
- Approaching Mallow from the east

Route information
- Length: 165.923 km (103.100 mi)

Location
- Country: Ireland
- Primary destinations: County Waterford; Leaves the N25 north of Dungarvan; Ballymacmague - joins/leaves the R672; Crosses the Finisk River; (R671); Cappoquin - (R669); Lismore - crosses the River Blackwater; (R668, R666); Tallowbridge - crosses the River Bride; R634; County Cork; Currabeha; Fermoy - passes under the M8; joins/leaves the R639 crossing the River Blackwater; (R512); Ballyhooley; Castletownroche - crosses the River Awbeg; (N73); Mallow - (N20); (R579); Dromagh; (R583); (R577); County Kerry; Rathmore - R582 joins/leaves; Barraduff - (R570); Killarney - joins the N22 east of the town and after 5 km leaves it north of the town; (N71); (R563); Killorglin - terminates at the N70

Highway system
- Roads in Ireland; Motorways; Primary; Secondary; Regional

The N72 road is a national secondary road in Ireland that runs east-west from its junction with the N25 near Dungarvan in County Waterford to the N70 in Killorglin in County Kerry.

The road passes through Lismore – Fermoy (M8) – Mallow (N20) – Rathmore – Killarney (N22) – Killorglin.

The N72 is 165.923 km long.

== Route ==
Like most national secondary roads, the N72 is mainly a single carriageway two-lane road. Some stretches are narrow with sharp bends. The N72 begins in County Waterford at the N25 near Dungarvan on the main Cork to Rosslare road. Travelling west from there to Cappoquin the road is single carriageway. From Cappoquin to Lismore the road is of good quality, with hard shoulders and a good surface. Past Lismore the road is of poorer quality, travelling via Tallowbridge and Fermoy to Mallow in County Cork. Some sections between Fermoy and Mallow are narrow with sharp bends and few hard shoulders. The section from Mallow to the R579 junction (Banteer) has hard shoulders. After the R579 junction, this section of the N72 has no hard shoulders until it joins the N22 in County Kerry, east of Killarney. Further west, after bypassing Killarney, the N72 leaves the N22 again, becoming part of the Ring of Kerry route to Killorglin, where the road terminates at the N70. When the N72 leaves the N22, it reaches its roundabout with the N71 which goes to Kenmare.

== Proposed upgrades ==
Funding of €2.4 million has been secured in 2011 for realignment of a particularly accident-prone stretch of the N72.

== Gallery ==
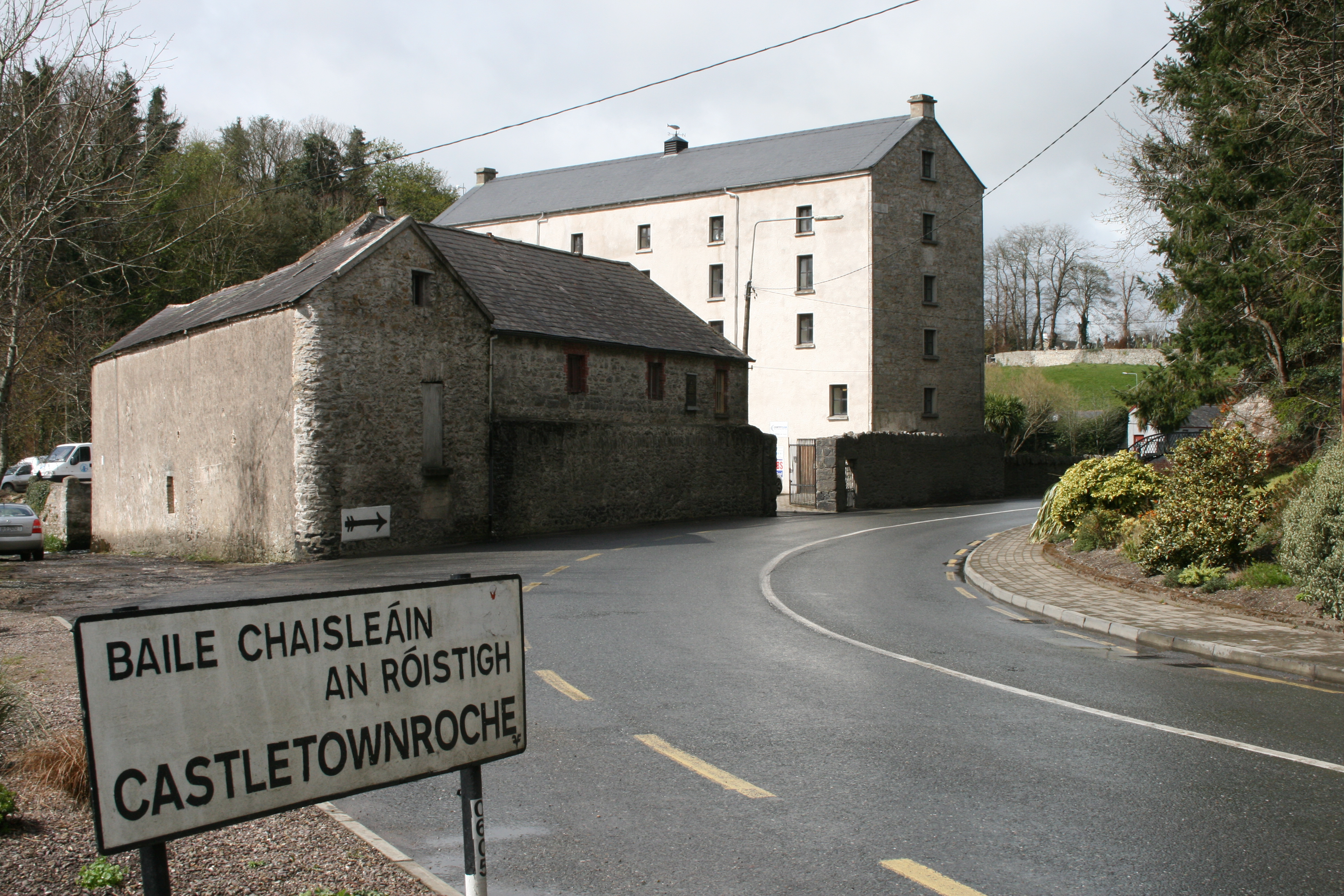
N72 entering Castletownroche from the east

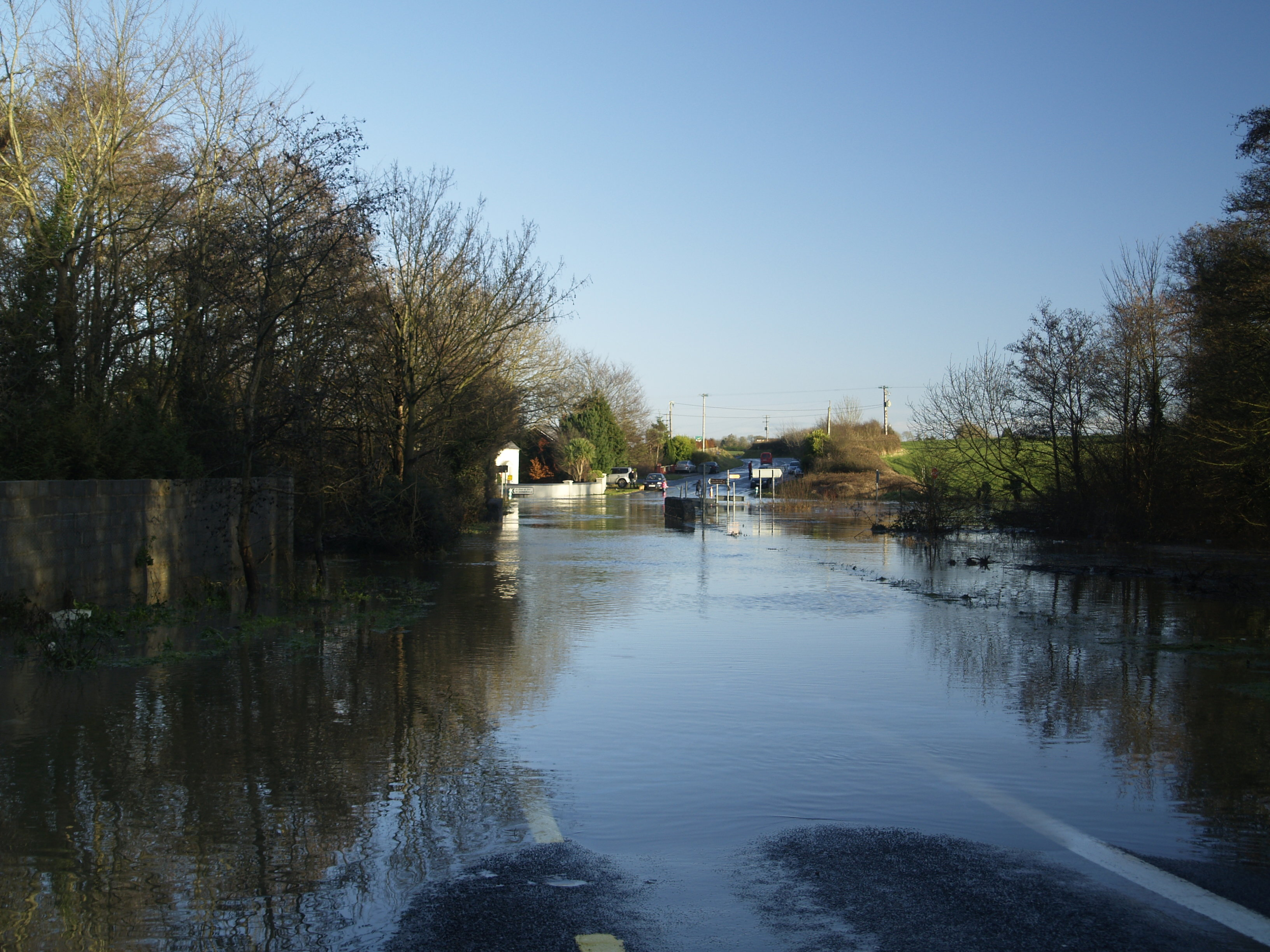
Floods on the N72 near Killavullen

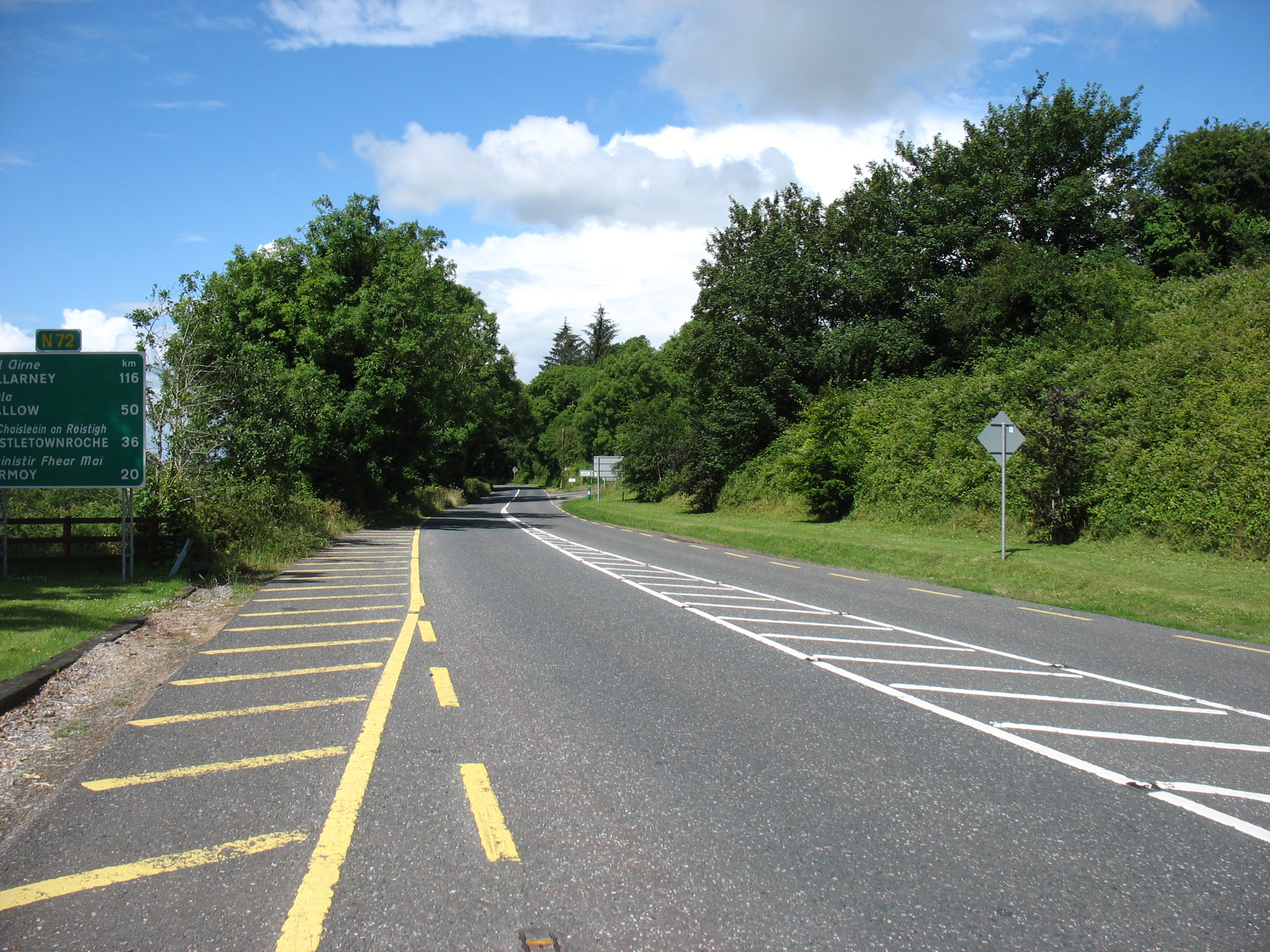
N72 north of Tallow, County Waterford

== See also ==
- Roads in Ireland
- Motorways in Ireland
- National primary road
- Regional road
