= Ballydesmond =

Village in County Cork, Ireland

Ballydesmond Baile Deasumhan
- Village
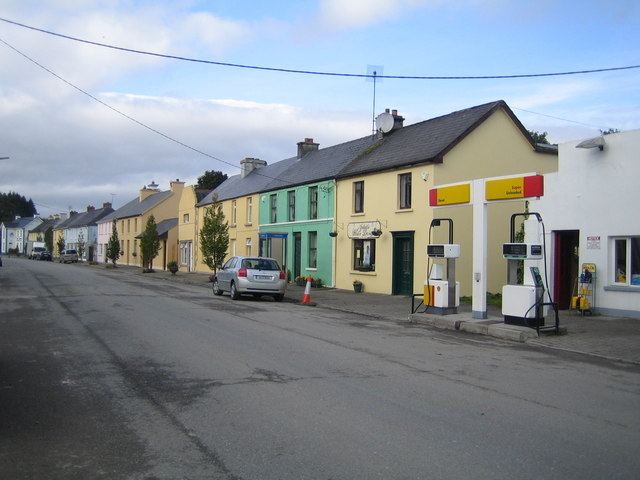
- Main Street

- Location in Ireland
- Coordinates: 52°11′N 9°14′W
- Country: Ireland
- Province: Munster
- County: County Cork

Population (2022)
  - Total: 216

Ballydesmond (Irish: Baile Deasumhan), formerly Kingwilliamstown, is a rural village in County Cork, Ireland. It lies on the Blackwater River (near its source in Menganine) on the Cork–Kerry border. The Ballydesmond quarry is an area of geological interest, containing the best example of tundra forest polygons found in Ireland. It is located at the junction of the R577 and R578 regional roads.

== History ==
Ballydesmond was established in the 1830s as a model village, and named Kingwilliamstown after King William IV of the United Kingdom. It had formerly been known as Tooreenkeogh. In 1951, it was officially renamed Ballydesmond, an anglicisation of the Irish name Baile Deasumhan. This is thought to refer to legendary rebel, the 15th Earl of Desmond, who is believed to have taken refuge in the nearby hills. However, Kingwilliamstown remained the official name of the townland.

Daniel Buckley, Hannah Riordan and Bridget Delia Bradley from Ballydesmond survived the sinking of the RMS Titanic.

The Tureengarriffe ambush occurred near Ballydesmond, where a number of British army officers were killed during the Irish War of Independence by untrained members of the local flying column of the Irish Republican Army. Nora Herlihy, a founder member of the Irish League of Credit Unions, is from Ballydesmond.

Near Ballydesmond lies the 600-acre Barna Bog, once a major peat-cutting site employing around 200 people. The bog was operated by Bord na Móna from 1941 to 1984. During peak production in 1957, it produced 10,000 tonnes of turf. In 2024, a local campaign group began seeking to conserve the bog, aiming to transform it into a nature reserve with walking trails, wildlife habitats and an education centre.

== Economy ==
Ballydesmond's local economy is based around a number of small businesses. Ballydesmond is home to Munster Joinery, a major window and door manufacturer which has an 80-acre production facility in the area and had a workforce of around 1,800 people across Ireland in 2022.

== Transport ==
The village is located on what was formerly the main Cork–Tralee road. The village centre is on the R577 regional road where it is joined by the R578 from the north and just west of where it is joined by the R582 from the south, and is about 17 kilometres (11 mi) west of Newmarket and 20 km (12 mi) east of Castleisland, County Kerry.

== Education ==
There are two primary schools in the parish. Ballydesmond National School sits beside the local church, overlooking the village. Foilogohig National School, or "Foyle" as it is locally known, used to operate in North Ballydesmond, catering for students who live a long distance from the village. There is also a crèche in Ballydesmond. Foilogohig N.S closed at the end of the 2008–2009 school year as there was insufficient numbers for the school to remain open. Ballydesmond N.S. got an internal refurbishment in 2010.

== Culture ==
Ballydesmond lies in the Sliabh Luachra area which is known for its traditional Irish music and culture.

== See also ==
- List of towns and villages in Ireland
- Ballydesmond GAA
