= List of towns and villages in County Cork =

This is a list of towns and villages in County Cork, Ireland.

== A ==
- Adrigole
- Aghabullogue
- Aghada
- Ahakista
- Aherla
- Ahiohill
- Allihies
- Ardfield
- Ardgroom

== B ==
- Ballinacurra
- Ballinadee
- Ballinagree
- Ballinascarty
- Ballincollig
- Ballindangan
- Ballineen
- Ballingeary
- Ballinhassig
- Ballinora
- Ballinspittle
- Ballintemple
- Ballymacoda
- Ballyclogh
- Ballydehob
- Ballydesmond
- Ballygarvan
- Ballylickey
- Ballymakeera
- Ballyvourney
- Ballymore
- Baltimore
- Bandon
- Banteer
- Bantry
- Bartlemy
- Béal na Bláth
- Belgooly
- Belvelly
- Bishopstown
- Blarney
- Boherbue
- Buttevant
- Bweeng

== C ==
- Canovee
- Cape Clear
- Carrigadrohid
- Carrigaline
- Carriganimmy
- Carrigtwohill
- Castlehaven
- Castlelyons
- Castlemartyr
- Castletownbere
- Castletownroche
- Castletownshend
- Castletown-Kinneigh
- Charleville
- Churchtown
- Cloghroe
- Clonakilty
- Clondrohid
- Clondulane
- Cloughduv
- Cloyne
- Coachford
- Cobh
- Conna
- Coolea
- Cork City
- Courtmacsherry
- Crookhaven
- Crookstown
- Crossbarry
- Crosshaven
- Cullen

== D ==
- Doneraile
- Donoughmore
- Douglas
- Drimoleague
- Drinagh
- Dripsey
- Dromahane
- Dunderrow
- Dungourney
- Dunmanway
- Durrus

== E ==
- Enniskean
- Eyeries

== F ==
- Farran
- Fermoy
- Fota Island
- Fountainstown

== G ==
- Glandore
- Glanmire
- Glanworth
- Glasheen
- Glenbrook
- Glengarriff
- Glounthaune
- Goleen
- Gougane Barra

== H ==
- Halfway

== I ==
- Innishannon

== K ==
- Kanturk
- Kealkill
- Kilbrittain
- Kilcrohane
- Kilmichael
- Kilnamartyra
- Kilumney
- Kilworth
- Kinsale
- Knockavilla
- Knocknagree
- Knockraha
- Killeagh

== L ==
- Ladysbridge
- Leap
- Little Island
- Liscarroll
- Lisgoold
- Lismire
- Lombardstown
- Lyre

== M ==
- Macroom
- Maine South
- Mallow
- Mayfield
- Meelin
- Midleton
- Milford
- Millstreet
- Minane Bridge
- Mitchelstown
- Mogeely
- Monkstown
- Montenotte
- Mourneabbey

== N ==
- Nad
- Newcestown
- Newmarket
- Newtownshandrum
- Nohoval

== O ==
- Ovens

== R ==
- Rathcormac
- Riverstick
- Rockchapel
- Rosscarbery
- Ringaskiddy

== S ==
- Sallybrook
- Schull
- Shanagarry
- Shanbally
- Shanballymore
- Sheep's Head
- Sherkin
- Skibbereen

== T ==
- Timoleague
- Togher
- Tower

== U ==
- Union Hall
- Upton

== W ==
- Waterfall
- Watergrasshill
- Whiddy
- Whitechurch
- Whitegate

== Y ==
- Youghal
