= List of townlands of the barony of Duhallow =

This is a sortable table of the townlands in the barony of Duhallow, County Cork, Ireland. Duplicate names occur where there is more than one townland with the same name in the barony, and also where a townland is known by two alternative names. Names marked in bold typeface are towns and villages, and the word Town appears for those entries in the area column.

== Townland list ==
Townland	Area (acres)	Barony	Civil parish	Poor law union
Acres	159	Duhallow	Kilmeen	Kanturk
Aghaneenagh	359	Duhallow	Kilmeen	Kanturk
Ahane Beg	158	Duhallow	Cullen	Millstreet
Ahane Lower	188	Duhallow	Cullen	Millstreet
Ahane Upper	303	Duhallow	Cullen	Millstreet
Aldworth	183	Duhallow	Kilshannig	Mallow
Anagloor	417	Duhallow	Drishane	Millstreet
Ardnageeha	311	Duhallow	Cullen	Millstreet
Assolas	303	Duhallow	Castlemagner	Kanturk
Ballagh	542	Duhallow	Tullylease	Kanturk
Ballinookery	204	Duhallow	Ballyclogh	Mallow
Ballintober	331	Duhallow	Castlemagner	Kanturk
Ballybahallagh	1,077	Duhallow	Churchtown	Kanturk
Ballybane	488	Duhallow	Kilbrin	Kanturk
Ballyboght	439	Duhallow	Kilshannig	Mallow
Ballyboneill	120	Duhallow	Kilshannig	Mallow
Ballyduane East	141	Duhallow	Clonfert	Kanturk
Ballyduane South	157	Duhallow	Clonfert	Kanturk
Ballyduane West	255	Duhallow	Clonfert	Kanturk
Ballygiblin	442	Duhallow	Castlemagner	Kanturk
Ballygrady North	354	Duhallow	Kilbrin	Kanturk
Ballygrady South	298	Duhallow	Kilbrin	Kanturk
Ballyhass	247	Duhallow	Castlemagner	Kanturk
Ballyheen Middle	142	Duhallow	Kilbrin	Kanturk
Ballyheen North	142	Duhallow	Kilbrin	Kanturk
Ballyheen South	154	Duhallow	Kilbrin	Kanturk
Ballyhest East	55	Duhallow	Kilbrin	Kanturk
Ballyhest West	88	Duhallow	Kilbrin	Kanturk
Ballyhoolahan East	235	Duhallow	Kilmeen	Kanturk
Ballyhoolahan Middle	418	Duhallow	Kilmeen	Kanturk
Ballyhoolahan West	694	Duhallow	Kilmeen	Kanturk
Ballymacmurragh	399	Duhallow	Castlemagner	Kanturk
Ballymacpierce	222	Duhallow	Kilbrin	Kanturk
Ballymaquirk	360	Duhallow	Dromtarriff	Kanturk
Ballynafeaha	167	Duhallow	Ballyclogh	Mallow
Ballynaguilla	396	Duhallow	Tullylease	Kanturk
Ballynamona	114	Duhallow	Castlemagner	Kanturk
Ballynoe	169	Duhallow	Kilbrin	Kanturk
Ballynoe	291	Duhallow	Kilshannig	Mallow
Ballyphilibee	225	Duhallow	Kilbrin	Kanturk
Ballyrusheen	378	Duhallow	Kilbrin	Kanturk
Ballysimon	300	Duhallow	Kilshannig	Mallow
Ballythomas	197	Duhallow	Ballyclogh	Mallow
Bannagh	251	Duhallow	Castlemagner	Kanturk
**Banteer**	Town	Duhallow	Clonmeen	Kanturk
Banteer	1,020	Duhallow	Clonmeen	Kanturk
Barleyhill	835	Duhallow	Clonfert	Kanturk
Barnacurra	508	Duhallow	Clonfert	Kanturk
Baunoulagh	53	Duhallow	Castlemagner	Kanturk
Bawnaneal	165	Duhallow	Kilmeen	Kanturk
Bawnmore North	443	Duhallow	Kilbrin	Kanturk
Bawnmore South	729	Duhallow	Kilbrin	Kanturk
Beenalaght	488	Duhallow	Kilshannig	Mallow
Beennamweel East	506	Duhallow	Kilshannig	Mallow
Beennamweel West	419	Duhallow	Kilshannig	Mallow
Bettyville	302	Duhallow	Castlemagner	Kanturk
Blueford	416	Duhallow	Clonfert	Kanturk
Bluepool	50	Duhallow	Castlemagner	Kanturk
**Boherbue**	Town	Duhallow	Kilmeen	Kanturk
Boola	403	Duhallow	Kilshannig	Mallow
Boolymore	1,031	Duhallow	Dromtarriff	Millstreet
Brittas	494	Duhallow	Kilshannig	Mallow
Caheraveelane	234	Duhallow	Kilshannig	Mallow
Cahernagh (Leland)	141	Duhallow	Tullylease	Kanturk
Cahernagh (Morgel)	200	Duhallow	Tullylease	Kanturk
Cahernagh East	110	Duhallow	Tullylease	Kanturk
Cappanagoul	509	Duhallow	Knocktemple	Kanturk
Cappaphaudeen	1,516	Duhallow	Kilmeen	Kanturk
Carragraigue	1,552	Duhallow	Dromtarriff	Millstreet
Carrigaline	380	Duhallow	Nohavaldaly	Millstreet
Carrigane	177	Duhallow	Rosskeen	Kanturk
Carriganes	1,013	Duhallow	Nohavaldaly	Kanturk
Carrigcastle	268	Duhallow	Clonfert	Kanturk
Carrigcleena Beg	314	Duhallow	Kilshannig	Mallow
Carrigcleena More	632	Duhallow	Kilshannig	Mallow
Castlecor Demesne	548	Duhallow	Kilbrin	Kanturk
Castlelohort Demesne	223	Duhallow	Castlemagner	Kanturk
Castlemacauliffe	214	Duhallow	Clonfert	Kanturk
Castlemagner	241	Duhallow	Castlemagner	Kanturk
**Cecilstown**	Town	Duhallow	Castlemagner	Kanturk
Cecilstown	239	Duhallow	Castlemagner	Kanturk
Charlesfield	684	Duhallow	Clonmeen	Kanturk
Church Hill	99	Duhallow	Cullen	Millstreet
Claragh More	462	Duhallow	Drishane	Millstreet
Claraghatlea North	397	Duhallow	Drishane	Millstreet
Claraghatlea South	185	Duhallow	Drishane	Millstreet
Clash	139	Duhallow	Kilbrin	Kanturk
Clashroe	404	Duhallow	Clonfert	Kanturk
Clashykinleen East	306	Duhallow	Kilmeen	Kanturk
Clashykinleen West	449	Duhallow	Kilmeen	Kanturk
Cleanrath	353	Duhallow	Cullen	Millstreet
Cloghboola	411	Duhallow	Kilbrin	Kanturk
Cloghvoula	1,249	Duhallow	Kilmeen	Kanturk
Clonfert	259	Duhallow	Clonfert	Kanturk
Clonmeen North	142	Duhallow	Clonmeen	Kanturk
Clonmeen South	392	Duhallow	Clonmeen	Kanturk
Clonrobin	545	Duhallow	Kilbrin	Kanturk
Cloonbannin East	476	Duhallow	Cullen	Millstreet
Cloonbannin West	258	Duhallow	Cullen	Millstreet
Cloongeel	659	Duhallow	Kilmeen	Kanturk
Cloongowan	238	Duhallow	Tullylease	Kanturk
Cloonteens	227	Duhallow	Rosskeen	Kanturk
Cloontycommade	297	Duhallow	Clonfert	Kanturk
Clyda	62	Duhallow	Kilshannig	Mallow
Clydaville	66	Duhallow	Kilshannig	Mallow
Coalpits	132	Duhallow	Cullen	Millstreet
Commons	185	Duhallow	Knocktemple	Kanturk
Commons North	258	Duhallow	Clonfert	Kanturk
Commons South	1,131	Duhallow	Clonfert	Kanturk
Coolacheesker	117	Duhallow	Clonmeen	Kanturk
Coolacoosane	315	Duhallow	Clonfert	Kanturk
Coolageela East	473	Duhallow	Kilbrin	Kanturk
Coolageela West	334	Duhallow	Kilbrin	Kanturk
Coolagh	335	Duhallow	Clonfert	Kanturk
Coolawaleen	291	Duhallow	Castlemagner	Kanturk
Coolbane	168	Duhallow	Knocktemple	Mallow
Coolbane	434	Duhallow	Tullylease	Kanturk
Coolclogh	465	Duhallow	Dromtarriff	Kanturk
Coolcloher East	215	Duhallow	Cullen	Millstreet
Coolcloher South	239	Duhallow	Cullen	Millstreet
Coolcloher West	214	Duhallow	Cullen	Millstreet
Coolmahane	197	Duhallow	Kilbrin	Kanturk
Coolnahane	484	Duhallow	Castlemagner	Kanturk
Coolnahilla	135	Duhallow	Kilbrin	Kanturk
Coolnamagh	138	Duhallow	Castlemagner	Kanturk
Coolnamagh	156	Duhallow	Ballyclogh	Mallow
Coolroebeg	392	Duhallow	Clonmeen	Kanturk
Coolroemore	1,159	Duhallow	Clonmeen	Kanturk
Coolykeerane	623	Duhallow	Drishane	Millstreet
Coolykereen	623	Duhallow	Clonfert	Kanturk
Copsefield	275	Duhallow	Clonfert	Kanturk
Corbally	468	Duhallow	Kilbrin	Kanturk
Creggane	218	Duhallow	Kilshannig	Mallow
Croanrea	701	Duhallow	Kilmeen	Kanturk
Cummerduff	216	Duhallow	Clonfert	Kanturk
Cummery Connell (North)	813	Duhallow	Clonfert	Kanturk
Cummery Connell (South)	1,536	Duhallow	Clonfert	Kanturk
Curraduff	565	Duhallow	Clonfert	Kanturk
Curragh	120	Duhallow	Kilmeen	Kanturk
Curragh	259	Duhallow	Kilbrin	Kanturk
Curragh	687	Duhallow	Clonfert	Kanturk
Curraghbower	220	Duhallow	Kilshannig	Mallow
Curraghcreen	181	Duhallow	Ballyclogh	Mallow
Curraghrour East	572	Duhallow	Clonmeen	Kanturk
Curraghrour West	480	Duhallow	Clonmeen	Kanturk
Curraghs	513	Duhallow	Kilbrin	Kanturk
Curraheen	606	Duhallow	Kilbrin	Kanturk
Curraleagh	157	Duhallow	Tullylease	Kanturk
Demesne	203	Duhallow	Clonfert	Kanturk
Dernagree	147	Duhallow	Dromtarriff	Millstreet
Derragh	317	Duhallow	Cullen	Millstreet
Derrishal	321	Duhallow	Kilmeen	Kanturk
Derry	776	Duhallow	Clonmeen	Kanturk
Derrygalun	397	Duhallow	Kilmeen	Kanturk
Derrygowna	410	Duhallow	Kilshannig	Mallow
Derryleagh	315	Duhallow	Kilmeen	Millstreet
Derrynamona	111	Duhallow	Kilmeen	Kanturk
Derrynatubbrid	375	Duhallow	Kilmeen	Millstreet
Doonasleen East	196	Duhallow	Kilmeen	Millstreet
Doonasleen North	526	Duhallow	Kilmeen	Millstreet
Doonasleen South	600	Duhallow	Kilmeen	Millstreet
Dromagh	446	Duhallow	Dromtarriff	Kanturk
Dromahoe	568	Duhallow	Dromtarriff	Kanturk
Dromalour	412	Duhallow	Dromtarriff	Kanturk
Dromanarrigle	467	Duhallow	Kilmeen	Kanturk
Dromaneen	790	Duhallow	Kilshannig	Mallow
Dromanig	297	Duhallow	Tullylease	Kanturk
Dromcummer Beg	249	Duhallow	Clonmeen	Kanturk
Dromcummer More	373	Duhallow	Clonmeen	Kanturk
Dromin	90	Duhallow	Kilbrin	Kanturk
Drominagh North	575	Duhallow	Dromtarriff	Millstreet
Drominagh South	463	Duhallow	Dromtarriff	Millstreet
Drominagore	405	Duhallow	Kilbrin	Kanturk
**Drommahane**	Town	Duhallow	Kilshannig	Mallow
Drommahane	531	Duhallow	Kilshannig	Mallow
Dromore	760	Duhallow	Kilshannig	Mallow
Dromore North	697	Duhallow	Kilshannig	Mallow
Dromore South	566	Duhallow	Kilshannig	Mallow
Drompeesh	292	Duhallow	Kilshannig	Mallow
Dromrastill	238	Duhallow	Ballyclogh	Mallow
Dromsicane	397	Duhallow	Cullen	Millstreet
Dromskarragh Beg	167	Duhallow	Kilmeen	Kanturk
Dromskarragh More	282	Duhallow	Kilmeen	Kanturk
Dromskehy	422	Duhallow	Dromtarriff	Kanturk
Dromtarriff	122	Duhallow	Dromtarriff	Kanturk
Duarrigle	147	Duhallow	Cullen	Millstreet
Duarrigle	520	Duhallow	Clonfert	Kanturk
Ducleagh	323	Duhallow	Dromtarriff	Kanturk
Duinch	690	Duhallow	Clonmeen	Kanturk
Dysert	639	Duhallow	Dromtarriff	Kanturk
Esk North	277	Duhallow	Kilshannig	Mallow
Esk South	471	Duhallow	Kilshannig	Mallow
Euglaune	137	Duhallow	Cullen	Millstreet
Farrangeel	391	Duhallow	Kilmeen	Kanturk
Farrankeal	408	Duhallow	Nohavaldaly	Millstreet
Fermoyle	380	Duhallow	Clonmeen	Kanturk
Firville West	350	Duhallow	Mallow	Mallow
Foiladaun	287	Duhallow	Clonfert	Kanturk
Foilogohig	735	Duhallow	Kilmeen	Kanturk
Fortgrady	506	Duhallow	Dromtarriff	Kanturk
Freemount	Town	Duhallow	Knocktemple	Kanturk
Freemount	382	Duhallow	Knocktemple	Kanturk
Gardeen	117	Duhallow	Kilcorcoran	Kanturk
Gardeen	178	Duhallow	Clonfert	Kanturk
Garragort	223	Duhallow	Knocktemple	Mallow
Garranbaun	93	Duhallow	Kilmeen	Kanturk
Garrane	244	Duhallow	Clonmeen	Kanturk
Garrane	599	Duhallow	Kilshannig	Mallow
Garrane North	175	Duhallow	Dromtarriff	Millstreet
Garrane South	201	Duhallow	Dromtarriff	Millstreet
Garrane West	194	Duhallow	Dromtarriff	Millstreet
Garranmacgarrett	323	Duhallow	Kilbrin	Kanturk
Garraunawarrig Lower	484	Duhallow	Clonfert	Kanturk
Garraunawarrig Upper	391	Duhallow	Clonfert	Kanturk
Garraunteefineen	137	Duhallow	Castlemagner	Kanturk
Garraveasoge	407	Duhallow	Dromtarriff	Kanturk
Garrison	471	Duhallow	Kilbrin	Kanturk
Gearanaskagh	280	Duhallow	Ballyclogh	Mallow
Glandine	755	Duhallow	Kilshannig	Mallow
Glanminnane	541	Duhallow	Kilshannig	Mallow
Glannaharee East	1,081	Duhallow	Kilshannig	Mallow
Glannaharee West	533	Duhallow	Kilshannig	Mallow
Glannoge	411	Duhallow	Kilshannig	Mallow
**Glantane**	Town	Duhallow	Kilshannig	Mallow
Glantane	482	Duhallow	Kilshannig	Mallow
Glantane Beg	222	Duhallow	Cullen	Millstreet
Glantane More	311	Duhallow	Cullen	Millstreet
Glantaunmacarthy	135	Duhallow	Kilmeen	Kanturk
Glanycummane Lower	265	Duhallow	Tullylease	Kanturk
Glanycummane Upper	329	Duhallow	Tullylease	Kanturk
Glashaboy East	567	Duhallow	Kilshannig	Mallow
Glashaboy West	633	Duhallow	Kilshannig	Mallow
Glasheenanargid	354	Duhallow	Clonfert	Kanturk
Glen North	541	Duhallow	Clonmeen	Kanturk
Glen South	1,023	Duhallow	Clonmeen	Kanturk
Glenacarney	897	Duhallow	Clonfert	Kanturk
Glenaknockane	915	Duhallow	Kilshannig	Mallow
Glenalougha	335	Duhallow	Kilmeen	Kanturk
Glencollins Lower	393	Duhallow	Nohavaldaly	Kanturk
Glencollins Upper	966	Duhallow	Nohavaldaly	Kanturk
Glenfield North	136	Duhallow	Knocktemple	Kanturk
Glenfield South	343	Duhallow	Knocktemple	Kanturk
Glenlahan	1,457	Duhallow	Kilmeen	Kanturk
Glenlara	951	Duhallow	Clonfert	Kanturk
Glenlohane	63	Duhallow	Castlemagner	Kanturk
Glennakeel North	307	Duhallow	Clonfert	Kanturk
Glennakeel South	1,540	Duhallow	Clonfert	Kanturk
Glennakeel West	791	Duhallow	Clonfert	Kanturk
Glennaknockane	646	Duhallow	Clonfert	Kanturk
Glennamucklagh East	843	Duhallow	Clonfert	Kanturk
Glennamucklagh West	1,320	Duhallow	Clonfert	Kanturk
Glenreagh	788	Duhallow	Kilmeen	Kanturk
Glentaneatnagh North	513	Duhallow	Clonmeen	Kanturk
Glentaneatnagh South	448	Duhallow	Clonmeen	Kanturk
Glentanedowney	363	Duhallow	Kilmeen	Kanturk
Glentanefinnane	1,621	Duhallow	Kilmeen	Kanturk
Glentanemacelligot	585	Duhallow	Clonfert	Kanturk
Gneeves	Town	Duhallow	Castlemagner	Kanturk
Gneeves	Town	Duhallow	Rosskeen	Kanturk
Gneeves	170	Duhallow	Castlemagner	Kanturk
Gneeves	425	Duhallow	Kilmeen	Kanturk
Gneeves	620	Duhallow	Kilshannig	Mallow
Gooseberryhill	1,361	Duhallow	Clonfert	Kanturk
Gortageen	569	Duhallow	Cullen	Millstreet
Gortateeboy	177	Duhallow	Kilmeen	Kanturk
Gortavoher	181	Duhallow	Kilshannig	Mallow
Gortbofinna	255	Duhallow	Ballyclogh	Mallow
Gortearagh	356	Duhallow	Kilmeen	Kanturk
Gorteennafinnoge	446	Duhallow	Cullen	Millstreet
Gortknockaneroe	290	Duhallow	Clonfert	Kanturk
Gortmolire	211	Duhallow	Kilshannig	Mallow
Gortmore	1,684	Duhallow	Clonmeen	Kanturk
Gortnacreha	225	Duhallow	Cullen	Millstreet
Gortnagark	93	Duhallow	Tullylease	Kanturk
Gortnaglogh	99	Duhallow	Clonfert	Kanturk
Gortnagross	55	Duhallow	Mallow	Mallow
Gortnagross	962	Duhallow	Ballyclogh	Mallow
Gortnascregga	336	Duhallow	Clonfert	Kanturk
Gortroe	376	Duhallow	Kilshannig	Mallow
Gougane	561	Duhallow	Clonmeen	Kanturk
Greenane	283	Duhallow	Kilroe	Kanturk
Greenfield	249	Duhallow	Clonfert	Kanturk
Grillough	356	Duhallow	Clonfert	Kanturk
Grillough	7	Duhallow	Kilcorcoran	Kanturk
Gurteen	536	Duhallow	Dromtarriff	Kanturk
Gurteenard	329	Duhallow	Clonmeen	Kanturk
Gurteenbeha	296	Duhallow	Castlemagner	Kanturk
Gurteennacloona	189	Duhallow	Rosskeen	Kanturk
Illaunknocknanagh	233	Duhallow	Kilmeen	Kanturk
Inchamay North	895	Duhallow	Clonmeen	Kanturk
Inchamay South	1,083	Duhallow	Clonmeen	Kanturk
Inchantotane	534	Duhallow	Clonfert	Kanturk
Inchidaly	208	Duhallow	Clonmeen	Kanturk
Island	534	Duhallow	Clonfert	Kanturk
Islandav	351	Duhallow	Kilmeen	Kanturk
Islandbrack	370	Duhallow	Kilmeen	Millstreet
Island-dahill	439	Duhallow	Dromtarriff	Millstreet
**Kanturk**	Town	Duhallow	Castlemagner	Kanturk
**Kanturk**	Town	Duhallow	Clonfert	Kanturk
**Kanturk**	Town	Duhallow	Kilroe	Kanturk
Kanturk	325	Duhallow	Clonfert	Kanturk
Keale North	258	Duhallow	Cullen	Millstreet
Keale South	210	Duhallow	Cullen	Millstreet
Kealmanagh	265	Duhallow	Cullen	Millstreet
Keel	206	Duhallow	Kilmeen	Kanturk
Keeltane	537	Duhallow	Tullylease	Kanturk
Kilbarrahan	126	Duhallow	Rosskeen	Kanturk
Kilbarry	498	Duhallow	Kilbrin	Kanturk
Kilberrihert	905	Duhallow	Knocktemple	Kanturk
Kilcaskan North	333	Duhallow	Clonmeen	Kanturk
Kilcaskan South	261	Duhallow	Clonmeen	Kanturk
Kilcolman	213	Duhallow	Dromtarriff	Kanturk
Kilcolman	410	Duhallow	Kilshannig	Mallow
Kilcranathan	409	Duhallow	Ballyclogh	Mallow
Kilgilky North	173	Duhallow	Castlemagner	Kanturk
Kilgilky South	378	Duhallow	Castlemagner	Kanturk
Kilgobban	152	Duhallow	Ballyclogh	Mallow
Kilgobnet	111	Duhallow	Kilshannig	Mallow
Kilknockane	675	Duhallow	Clonfert	Kanturk
Killarush	145	Duhallow	Clonmeen	Kanturk
Killasseragh	165	Duhallow	Kilmeen	Kanturk
Killavallig	339	Duhallow	Castlemagner	Kanturk
Killavoy	595	Duhallow	Clonmeen	Kanturk
Killeenleagh	418	Duhallow	Kilmeen	Kanturk
Killetragh	468	Duhallow	Dromtarriff	Millstreet
Killinane	243	Duhallow	Knocktemple	Kanturk
Killinane	479	Duhallow	Dromtarriff	Kanturk
Killowen	349	Duhallow	Clonfert	Kanturk
Kilmacurrane	733	Duhallow	Clonmeen	Kanturk
Kilmichael	125	Duhallow	Ballyclogh	Mallow
Kilnahulla Beg	168	Duhallow	Kilmeen	Kanturk
Kilnahulla More	408	Duhallow	Kilmeen	Kanturk
Kilpadder North	262	Duhallow	Kilshannig	Mallow
Kilpadder South	344	Duhallow	Kilshannig	Mallow
Kilpatrick	122	Duhallow	Castlemagner	Kanturk
Kilroe	248	Duhallow	Ballyclogh	Mallow
Kilvealaton East	118	Duhallow	Kilshannig	Mallow
Kilvealaton West	385	Duhallow	Kilshannig	Mallow
Kingwilliamstown (or Ballydesmond ??)	254	Duhallow	Nohavaldaly	Kanturk
Kippagh	153	Duhallow	Kilmeen	Kanturk
Kippagh	198	Duhallow	Dromtarriff	Kanturk
Kippagh Middle	95	Duhallow	Castlemagner	Kanturk
Kippagh North	137	Duhallow	Castlemagner	Kanturk
Kippagh South	60	Duhallow	Castlemagner	Kanturk
Kishkeam Lower	306	Duhallow	Kilmeen	Kanturk
Kishkeam Upper	490	Duhallow	Kilmeen	Kanturk
Knawhill	345	Duhallow	Knocktemple	Kanturk
Knock	232	Duhallow	Clonmeen	Kanturk
Knockacarracoosh	221	Duhallow	Cullen	Millstreet
Knockaclarig	1,096	Duhallow	Kilmeen	Kanturk
Knockacluggin	739	Duhallow	Clonfert	Kanturk
Knockacummer	405	Duhallow	Clonfert	Kanturk
Knockagarrane East	118	Duhallow	Cullen	Millstreet
Knockagarrane West	105	Duhallow	Cullen	Millstreet
Knockagolig	504	Duhallow	Kilbrin	Kanturk
Knockahorrea East	855	Duhallow	Clonfert	Kanturk
Knockahorrea West	832	Duhallow	Clonfert	Kanturk
Knockalohert	339	Duhallow	Kilbrin	Kanturk
Knockane	151	Duhallow	Cullen	Millstreet
Knockaneda	162	Duhallow	Knocktemple	Kanturk
Knockaneglass East	213	Duhallow	Tullylease	Kanturk
Knockaneglass West	131	Duhallow	Tullylease	Kanturk
Knockaneroe	317	Duhallow	Kilmeen	Kanturk
Knockansweeny	170	Duhallow	Kilshannig	Mallow
Knockardfree	365	Duhallow	Kilbrin	Kanturk
Knockardrahan	479	Duhallow	Dromtarriff	Kanturk
Knockardsharriv	268	Duhallow	Castlemagner	Kanturk
Knockastuckane	315	Duhallow	Cullen	Millstreet
Knockatooan	641	Duhallow	Clonfert	Kanturk
Knockatoumpane	356	Duhallow	Tullylease	Kanturk
Knockavaddra	1,084	Duhallow	Kilshannig	Mallow
Knockavoreen	408	Duhallow	Kilmeen	Kanturk
Knockawillin	479	Duhallow	Tullylease	Kanturk
Knockawillin	604	Duhallow	Clonfert	Kanturk
Knockballymartin	327	Duhallow	Kilbrin	Kanturk
Knockbrack	606	Duhallow	Dromtarriff	Kanturk
Knockcahill	291	Duhallow	Dromtarriff	Millstreet
Knockcloona	114	Duhallow	Knocktemple	Kanturk
Knockdrislagh	383	Duhallow	Kilshannig	Mallow
Knockduff Lower	124	Duhallow	Cullen	Millstreet
Knockduff Lower	812	Duhallow	Clonfert	Kanturk
Knockduff Upper	1,204	Duhallow	Clonfert	Kanturk
Knockduff Upper	360	Duhallow	Cullen	Millstreet
Knockeanagh	828	Duhallow	Tullylease	Kanturk
Knockeenacurrig East	186	Duhallow	Kilmeen	Kanturk
Knockeenacurrig West	286	Duhallow	Kilmeen	Kanturk
Knockeenadallane	275	Duhallow	Cullen	Millstreet
Knockeenadallane	437	Duhallow	Kilmeen	Kanturk
Knockeenatuder	161	Duhallow	Clonmeen	Kanturk
Knockeennagearagh	256	Duhallow	Cullen	Millstreet
Knockfadda	72	Duhallow	Clonfert	Kanturk
Knockilly	681	Duhallow	Clonfert	Kanturk
Knocklagh	285	Duhallow	Kilmeen	Kanturk
Knockmanagh	318	Duhallow	Kilmeen	Kanturk
Knocknacolan	371	Duhallow	Kilroe	Kanturk
Knocknacurragh	381	Duhallow	Kilmeen	Kanturk
Knocknageeha East	228	Duhallow	Cullen	Millstreet
Knocknageeha North	238	Duhallow	Cullen	Millstreet
Knocknageeha South	174	Duhallow	Cullen	Millstreet
Knocknageeha West	168	Duhallow	Cullen	Millstreet
Knocknagree	448	Duhallow	Nohavaldaly	Millstreet
Knocknamona	411	Duhallow	Kilshannig	Mallow
Knocknamuck	259	Duhallow	Knocktemple	Kanturk
Knocknamucklagh	225	Duhallow	Knocktemple	Kanturk
Knocknanagh Commons	365	Duhallow	Kilmeen	Kanturk
Knocknanagh East	434	Duhallow	Kilmeen	Kanturk
Knocknanagh West	416	Duhallow	Kilmeen	Kanturk
Knocknanuss	262	Duhallow	Subulter	Kanturk
Knocknashannagh	302	Duhallow	Cullen	Millstreet
Knockskavane	910	Duhallow	Clonfert	Kanturk
Knockskehy	797	Duhallow	Clonfert	Kanturk
Knockyhena	595	Duhallow	Nohavaldaly	Millstreet
Knockyrourke	529	Duhallow	Kilmeen	Kanturk
Knoppoge	11	Duhallow	Clonfert	Kanturk
Knoppoge	197	Duhallow	Kilcorcoran	Kanturk
Lackaleigh	96	Duhallow	Subulter	Kanturk
Lackanastooka	431	Duhallow	Nohavaldaly	Millstreet
Lackaneen	284	Duhallow	Kilshannig	Mallow
Lackeel	159	Duhallow	Kilbrin	Kanturk
Lackendarragh	911	Duhallow	Kilshannig	Mallow
Laght	423	Duhallow	Dromtarriff	Millstreet
Laghtsigh	442	Duhallow	Nohavaldaly	Millstreet
Laharan East	272	Duhallow	Kilmeen	Kanturk
Laharan West	192	Duhallow	Kilmeen	Kanturk
Laharen	759	Duhallow	Kilshannig	Mallow
Liscongill	247	Duhallow	Clonfert	Kanturk
Lisdangan	345	Duhallow	Clonfert	Kanturk
Lisduggan North	221	Duhallow	Castlemagner	Kanturk
Lisduggan South	304	Duhallow	Castlemagner	Kanturk
Lisheenafeela	317	Duhallow	Cullen	Millstreet
Lisheenowen	238	Duhallow	Kilcorcoran	Kanturk
Lislehane	175	Duhallow	Cullen	Millstreet
Lismeelcunnin	760	Duhallow	Clonfert	Kanturk
Lismire	752	Duhallow	Clonfert	Kanturk
Lisnaboy Lower	247	Duhallow	Cullen	Millstreet
Lisnaboy Upper	267	Duhallow	Cullen	Millstreet
Lisnacon	425	Duhallow	Dromtarriff	Kanturk
Lisnashearshane	296	Duhallow	Cullen	Millstreet
Lisrobin East	297	Duhallow	Kilmeen	Kanturk
Lisrobin West	527	Duhallow	Kilmeen	Kanturk
Lissaniska	149	Duhallow	Cullen	Millstreet
Lohort East	250	Duhallow	Castlemagner	Kanturk
Lohort West	228	Duhallow	Castlemagner	Kanturk
Lombardstown	358	Duhallow	Kilshannig	Mallow
Longacre	214	Duhallow	Clonfert	Kanturk
Longueville	317	Duhallow	Ballyclogh	Mallow
Loumanagh North	211	Duhallow	Kilmeen	Millstreet
Loumanagh South	528	Duhallow	Kilmeen	Millstreet
Lyraneag	771	Duhallow	Clonfert	Kanturk
Lyravuckane	227	Duhallow	Cullen	Millstreet
Lyre	503	Duhallow	Clonmeen	Kanturk
Lyre	77	Duhallow	Knocktemple	Kanturk
Lyredaowen	489	Duhallow	Nohavaldaly	Millstreet
Mahanagh	135	Duhallow	Kilbrin	Kanturk
Marybrook	171	Duhallow	Kilbrin	Kanturk
Maulyclickeen	353	Duhallow	Kilmeen	Millstreet
Meelaherragh	403	Duhallow	Clonfert	Kanturk
Meenagloghrane	365	Duhallow	Cullen	Millstreet
Meenaraheeny	813	Duhallow	Clonfert	Kanturk
Meenatarriff	127	Duhallow	Clonfert	Kanturk
Meendurragha	276	Duhallow	Kilmeen	Kanturk
Meeneeshal	686	Duhallow	Clonfert	Kanturk
Meengorman	495	Duhallow	Clonfert	Kanturk
Meenkearagh	635	Duhallow	Clonfert	Kanturk
Meenroe	244	Duhallow	Clonfert	Kanturk
Meens	322	Duhallow	Kilmeen	Kanturk
Meens	787	Duhallow	Clonfert	Kanturk
Meenskeha East	222	Duhallow	Cullen	Millstreet
Meenskeha West	250	Duhallow	Cullen	Millstreet
Meentinny East	560	Duhallow	Clonfert	Kanturk
Meentinny West	1,403	Duhallow	Clonfert	Kanturk
Meentyflugh	347	Duhallow	Kilmeen	Kanturk
Milleenboy	822	Duhallow	Clonfert	Kanturk
Milleenduff	1,346	Duhallow	Clonfert	Kanturk
Milleenylegane	122	Duhallow	Cullen	Millstreet
Minehill	165	Duhallow	Dromtarriff	Millstreet
Moanroe	202	Duhallow	Ballyclogh	Mallow
Moher	427	Duhallow	Cullen	Millstreet
Mohereen	486	Duhallow	Kilshannig	Mallow
Monanveel	463	Duhallow	Kilshannig	Mallow
Mounthillary	115	Duhallow	Kilshannig	Mallow
Mountinfant	311	Duhallow	Nohavaldaly	Millstreet
Mountkeeffe	707	Duhallow	Clonfert	Kanturk
Muckenagh	463	Duhallow	Tullylease	Kanturk
Muinganine	1,063	Duhallow	Nohavaldaly	Kanturk
Muingyroogeen	218	Duhallow	Clonmeen	Kanturk
Mullaghroe North	166	Duhallow	Cullen	Millstreet
Mullaghroe South	186	Duhallow	Cullen	Millstreet
Nadanuller Beg	498	Duhallow	Clonmeen	Kanturk
Nadanuller More	682	Duhallow	Clonmeen	Kanturk
Newberry	294	Duhallow	Kilshannig	Mallow
**Newmarket**	Town	Duhallow	Clonfert	Kanturk
Newmarket	144	Duhallow	Clonfert	Kanturk
Newtown	78	Duhallow	Mallow	Mallow
Nohaval Lower	414	Duhallow	Nohavaldaly	Millstreet
Nohaval Upper	477	Duhallow	Nohavaldaly	Millstreet
Nohavaldaly	964	Duhallow	Nohavaldaly	Millstreet
Nursetown Beg	254	Duhallow	Kilshannig	Mallow
Nursetown More	356	Duhallow	Kilshannig	Mallow
Paal East	247	Duhallow	Kilmeen	Kanturk
Paal West	393	Duhallow	Kilmeen	Kanturk
Pallas	620	Duhallow	Rosskeen	Kanturk
Park	233	Duhallow	Nohavaldaly	Millstreet
Park	457	Duhallow	Clonfert	Kanturk
Poulavare	164	Duhallow	Tullylease	Kanturk
Prohus	312	Duhallow	Dromtarriff	Millstreet
Pulleen	343	Duhallow	Castlemagner	Kanturk
Raheen	372	Duhallow	Tullylease	Kanturk
Rascalstreet	234	Duhallow	Kilmeen	Kanturk
Rathcool	979	Duhallow	Dromtarriff	Millstreet
Rathmaher	98	Duhallow	Castlemagner	Kanturk
Rathnagard	239	Duhallow	Kilbrin	Kanturk
Rathranna	434	Duhallow	Clonfert	Kanturk
Rathroe	223	Duhallow	Cullen	Millstreet
Rea-allen	293	Duhallow	Kilmeen	Kanturk
Reanagashel	341	Duhallow	Kilmeen	Kanturk
Reanahoun	880	Duhallow	Clonfert	Kanturk
Reandallane	242	Duhallow	Kilmeen	Kanturk
Rockhill East	779	Duhallow	Clonfert	Kanturk
Rockhill West	1,329	Duhallow	Clonfert	Kanturk
Roskeen	4	Duhallow	Rosskeen	Kanturk
Rosnagussane	124	Duhallow	Ballyclogh	Mallow
Rossacon	691	Duhallow	Clonfert	Kanturk
Rossglass	184	Duhallow	Dromtarriff	Kanturk
Rossline	128	Duhallow	Clonfert	Kanturk
Rossline	450	Duhallow	Kilcorcoran	Kanturk
Rowls Aldworth	166	Duhallow	Clonfert	Kanturk
Rowls Allen	412	Duhallow	Clonfert	Kanturk
Rowls Daunt	254	Duhallow	Clonfert	Kanturk
Rowls Langford (North)	1,125	Duhallow	Clonfert	Kanturk
Rowls Langford (South)	1,314	Duhallow	Clonfert	Kanturk
Rowls Noonan	641	Duhallow	Clonfert	Kanturk
Rowls Shaddock	250	Duhallow	Clonfert	Kanturk
Ruanes	133	Duhallow	Ballyclogh	Mallow
Rusheen	280	Duhallow	Kilcorcoran	Kanturk
**Sallys Cross Roads**	Town	Duhallow	Castlemagner	Kanturk
Scarteen Lower	702	Duhallow	Clonfert	Kanturk
Scarteen Upper	730	Duhallow	Clonfert	Kanturk
Scrahan	304	Duhallow	Nohavaldaly	Millstreet
Shanaknock	348	Duhallow	Drishane	Millstreet
Shanavoher	483	Duhallow	Kilmeen	Kanturk
Shanavoher	774	Duhallow	Kilshannig	Mallow
Shanbally	428	Duhallow	Nohavaldaly	Millstreet
Shronebeha	518	Duhallow	Clonmeen	Kanturk
Skagh	296	Duhallow	Cullen	Millstreet
Skarragh	538	Duhallow	Kilshannig	Mallow
Smithfield	198	Duhallow	Kilshannig	Mallow
Spring Grove	263	Duhallow	Kilroe	Kanturk
Springville	72	Duhallow	Kilbrin	Kanturk
Stumphill	360	Duhallow	Subulter	Kanturk
Subulter	382	Duhallow	Subulter	Kanturk
Sunfort	230	Duhallow	Knocktemple	Kanturk
Taurbeg	410	Duhallow	Clonfert	Kanturk
Taurmore	1,135	Duhallow	Clonfert	Kanturk
Toorard	922	Duhallow	Clonfert	Kanturk
Tooreen	221	Duhallow	Clonmeen	Kanturk
Tooreen Donnell	140	Duhallow	Clonfert	Kanturk
Tooreenavuscaun	388	Duhallow	Kilmeen	Kanturk
Tooreenclassagh	587	Duhallow	Nohavaldaly	Kanturk
Tooreencormack	145	Duhallow	Clonfert	Kanturk
Tooreendermot	360	Duhallow	Clonfert	Kanturk
Tooreenduff	516	Duhallow	Kilmeen	Kanturk
Tooreenfineen	1,240	Duhallow	Kilmeen	Kanturk
Tooreenglanahee	789	Duhallow	Nohavaldaly	Kanturk
Tooreenmacauliffe	1,174	Duhallow	Clonfert	Kanturk
Tooreennagrena	624	Duhallow	Clonfert	Kanturk
Tooreennaguppoge	313	Duhallow	Clonfert	Kanturk
Tooreennamire	230	Duhallow	Clonfert	Kanturk
Tooreenreaghy	143	Duhallow	Nohavaldaly	Millstreet
Tulladuff	359	Duhallow	Knocktemple	Kanturk
Tullylease	251	Duhallow	Tullylease	Kanturk
Two Gneeves	199	Duhallow	Cullen	Millstreet
Two Gneeves	71	Duhallow	Castlemagner	Kanturk
Ummeraboy East	371	Duhallow	Kilmeen	Millstreet
Ummeraboy West	709	Duhallow	Kilmeen	Millstreet
Urraghilbeg	417	Duhallow	Kilmeen	Kanturk
Urraghilmore East	417	Duhallow	Kilmeen	Millstreet
Urraghilmore West	416	Duhallow	Kilmeen	Millstreet
Woodpark	277	Duhallow	Ballyclogh	Mallow
