= Knockacarracoush =

Knockacarracoosh Irish: Cnoc an Chearrbhachais
- townland
- Knockacarracoosh shown within Ireland
- Coordinates: 52°07′44″N 09°04′27″W
- Country: Ireland
- County: County Cork
- Barony: Duhallow
- Civil parish: Cullen

Area
  - Total: 89 ha (221 acres)

Knockacarracoush or Knockacarracoosh (Irish: Cnoc an Chearrbhachais) is a small townland situated in north County Cork, Ireland, west of Kanturk and north of Millstreet. It is in the parish of Dromtarriff and also borders the parishes of Cullen and Boherbue. It has 14 inhabitants and consists of three farms and four houses.

== Archaeology ==
Archaeological sites include four ringforts and two souterrains.

== See also ==
- List of townlands of the Barony of Duhallow
