= Bweeng =

Village in County Cork, Ireland

Bweeng Na Boinn
- Village
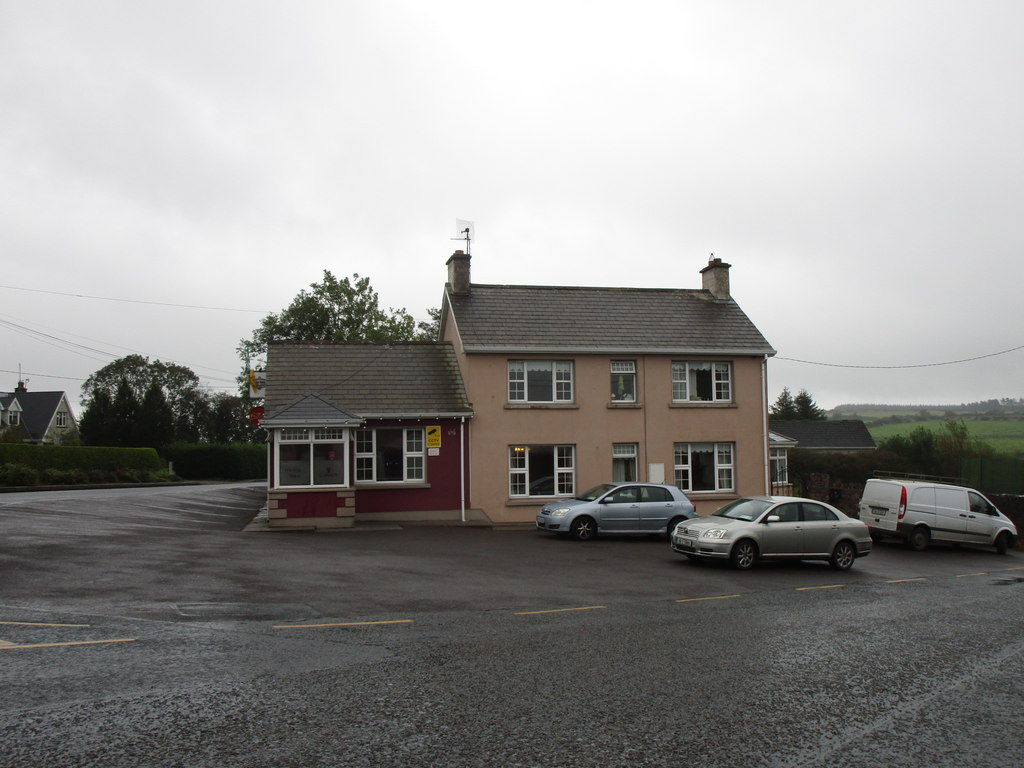
- Molly's Bar, Bweeng

- Location in Ireland
- Coordinates: 52°2′35″N 8°43′3″W
- Country: Ireland
- Province: Munster
- County: County Cork

Population (2022)
  - Total: 728
- Time zone: UTC+0 (WET)
  - Summer (DST): UTC-1 (IST (WEST))

Bweeng (Irish: Na Boinn, meaning 'The Coins') is a village located approximately 14 km (9 mi) south west of the town of Mallow, County Cork, Ireland on the R619 regional road. Bweeng is within the Dáil constituency of Cork North-West and the townlands of Beennamweel West, Beennamweel East, Shanavoher, Ballyboght and Glashaboy West in the civil parish of Kilshannig.

== Transportation ==
The nearest railway station is Mallow railway station, which is on the Mallow-Tralee and Dublin-Cork railway lines.

Bweeng is also accessible by the R619 road.

== Facilities ==
St. Columba's Roman Catholic Church holds regular masses. The village also has one pub, a community centre, playing field and walkway.

The village is served by the local primary school, Bweeng National School, which was opened in 1953.

== Sport ==
Bweeng, along with Dromahane, Lombardstown and Glantane, is represented in Gaelic games by the Kilshannig club. The club's headquarters are O'Connell Park in Glantane. Bweeng Celtic is the village's association football club. They play their home games in Bweeng Community Centre.

== See also ==
- List of towns and villages in Ireland
