= Michael O'Sullivan (jockey) =

Irish jockey (2000–2025)

Personal information
- Nationality: Irish
- Born: 21 February 2000 Lombardstown, County Cork, Ireland
- Died: 16 February 2025 (aged 24) Wilton, Cork, Ireland
- Resting place: St John's Cemetery, Glantane
- Occupation: Jump jockey

Horse racing career
- Sport: Horse racing
- Career winnings: €1,225,673
- Career wins: 95

Major racing wins
- Supreme Novices' Hurdle; Golden Cygnet Novice Hurdle; Royal Bond Novice Hurdle; Fred Winter Juvenile Handicap Hurdle

Racing awards
- Irish Champion Conditional Jockey (2023); Champion Under-21 Rider (2019)

Memorials
- Michael O'Sullivan Supreme Novices' Hurdle (2025)

Significant horses
- Marine Nationale; Good Land

Michael O'Sullivan (21 February 2000 – 16 February 2025) was an Irish jockey who won the Supreme Novices' Hurdle and Fred Winter Juvenile Handicap Hurdle at the 2023 Cheltenham Festival. O'Sullivan died on 16 February 2025 from injuries sustained during a race at Thurles ten days prior.

== Early life ==
O'Sullivan was born in Lombardstown, County Cork and came from a family that had a long association with national hunt racing. His father, William, won the Foxhunters' Chase in 1991, on Lovely Citizen, a horse owned and bred by his grandfather Owen and trained by his uncle Eugene. O'Sullivan's cousin, Maxine, is also a Cheltenham Festival winner.

O'Sullivan graduated with a degree in Agricultural Science from University College Dublin in 2022.

== Career ==
O'Sullivan started off his riding career doing point-to-point horseracing. His first win was in 2018, when he achieved a 47-length victory in a hunter chase with Wilcosdiana at Cork. O'Sullivan was the champion under-21 rider in 2019, before turning professional in September 2022.

He had a day one double at the 2023 Cheltenham Festival with Marine Nationale and Gordon Elliott's Jazzy Matty. O'Sullivan ended his breakthrough campaign by being named Irish Champion conditional jockey with 32 winners.

In all, O'Sullivan rode 90 winners in Ireland and five in Britain under rules. He was noted for his associations with Barry Connell as well as Noel George and Amanda Zetterholm.

== Accident and death ==
On 6 February 2025, O'Sullivan was on board Wee Charlie in a handicap chase at Thurles when he was severely injured after being one of three fallers at the final fence. He received treatment at the course and was later transferred via air ambulance to Cork University Hospital where he was put into an induced coma.

O'Sullivan died from his injuries on 16 February 2025, five days before his 25th birthday. Racing at Punchestown on the same day, alongside point to point fixtures at Knockanard, Nenagh and Tinahely were cancelled. Jockeys in Great Britain wore black armbands in tribute to O'Sullivan at Musselburgh and Lingfield.

His funeral was held on 19 February 2025 at St. John the Baptist Church in Glantane. Racing personalities including Willie Mullins and Ruby Walsh were in attendance, whilst racehorse Barr na Sraide trained by his uncle Eugene led the cortège. O'Sullivan was buried in St John's Cemetery, Glantane. The following day, fellow jockey Harry Derham dedicated his winner Teddy Blue at Huntingdon to the memory of O'Sullivan.

The 2025 Supreme Novices Hurdle at Cheltenham was renamed the "Michael O'Sullivan Supreme Novices' Hurdle" following an agreement between race sponsor Sky Bet, The Jockey Club and O'Sullivan's family as a memorial to O'Sullivan.

== Major wins ==
(Republic of Ireland) Ireland

- Golden Cygnet Novice Hurdle - Good Land (2023)
- Royal Bond Novice Hurdle - Marine Nationale (2022)

== Cheltenham Festival winners (2) ==
- Supreme Novices' Hurdle - Marine Nationale (2023)
- Fred Winter Juvenile Handicap Hurdle - Jazzy Matty (2023)
