= Derrinagree =

Village in County Cork, Ireland

Derrinagree Doire na Graí Dernagree
- Village
- Location in Ireland
- Coordinates: 52.120738°N 9.033457°W
- Country: Ireland
- Province: Munster
- County: County Cork
- Time zone: UTC+0 (WET)
  - Summer (DST): UTC-1 (IST (WEST))

Derrinagree, also spelled Dernagree and Derinagree, (Irish: Doire na Graí, meaning 'oakwood of the cattle') is a small village in north west of County Cork, Ireland. It is in civil parish of Dromtarrife in the barony of Duhallow.

== Location and amenities ==
Derrinagree is located just off the N72 road which links Mallow to Killarney. The nearest market towns are Millstreet (8.5km) to the south and Boherbue (6km) to the north. The village has no public transport. The closest rail links are from Millstreet and Banteer stations. Derrinagree has a primary school and a Catholic church. Derrinagree used to have a post office, but it closed in 2015.

== Sport ==
Dromtarriffe GAA club represents Derrinagree in Gaelic football and hurling.

== See also ==
- List of townlands of the barony of Duhallow
