= R638 road (Ireland) =

Regional road in County Cork, Ireland

Coordinates: 52°07′16″N 8°39′52″W

R638 road
- Bóthar R638
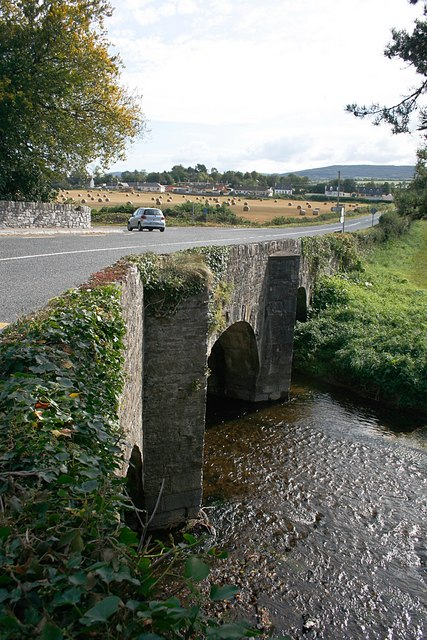
- R619 crossing Clyda Bridge; the R619 continues to the left, while the R638 begins straight on.

Route information
- Length: 2.3 km (1.4 mi)

Major junctions
- From: R619 at Quartertown Lower
- R620 at Gooldshill
- To: N20 at Quartertown Upper

Location
- Country: Ireland

Highway system
- Roads in Ireland; Motorways; Primary; Secondary; Regional
← R637	→ R639

The R638 road is a regional road in northern County Cork, Ireland. It connects the R619 to the N20 south of Mallow.
