= R621 road (Ireland) =

Regional road in Ireland

R621 road
- Bóthar R621
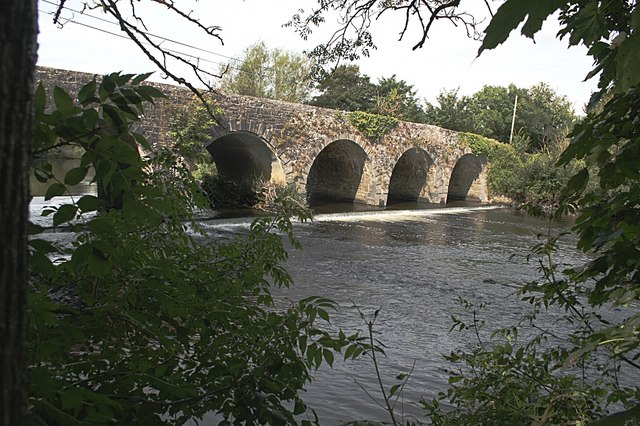
- Longfield's Bridge carries the R621 over the River Blackwater

Route information
- Length: 1.7 km (1.1 mi)

Major junctions
- From: N72 at Gortnagross, County Cork
- To: R619 at Newberry Cross

Location
- Country: Ireland

Highway system
- Roads in Ireland; Motorways; Primary; Secondary; Regional
← R620	→ R622

The R621 road is a regional road in County Cork, Ireland. It travels from the R619 at Gortnagross to the N72 at Newberry Cross. The R621 is 1.7 kilometres (1.1 mi) long.
