= R617 road =

R617 road may refer to:

- R617 road (Ireland)
- R617 (South Africa)
