= R622 road =

R622 road may refer to:

- R622 road (Ireland)
- R622 road (South Africa)
