= R580 road =

R580 road may refer to:

- R580 road (Ireland)
- R580 (South Africa)
