= Bóthar Buí =

Bóthar Buí (Irish for 'yellow road') may refer to several places on the island of Ireland:

- Boherbue, County Cork, a village
- Draperstown, County Londonderry, a village
- Enfield, County Meath, a town
