= List of towns and villages in County Cavan by population =

This is a list of towns and villages in County Cavan, Ireland. At the 2016 census, the county population was 76,176. Population figures below are for settlements included in the 2016 census.

== List of towns and villages by population ==
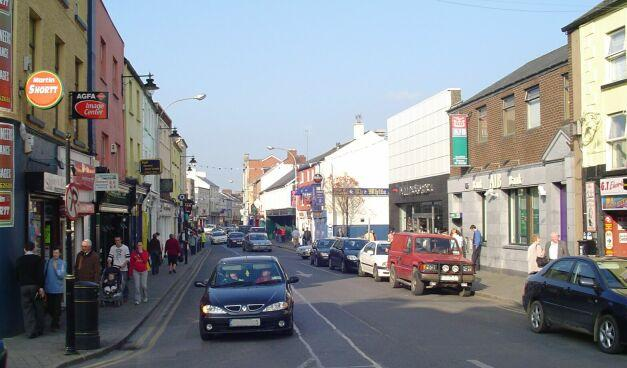
Cavan, county town and largest in county

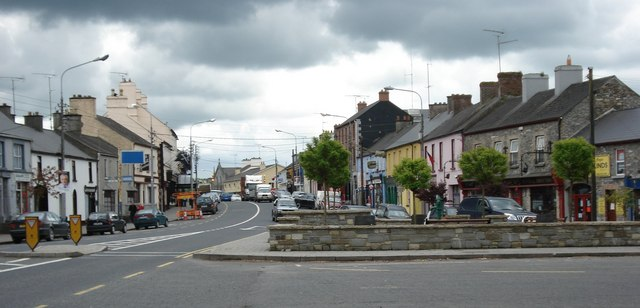
Virginia

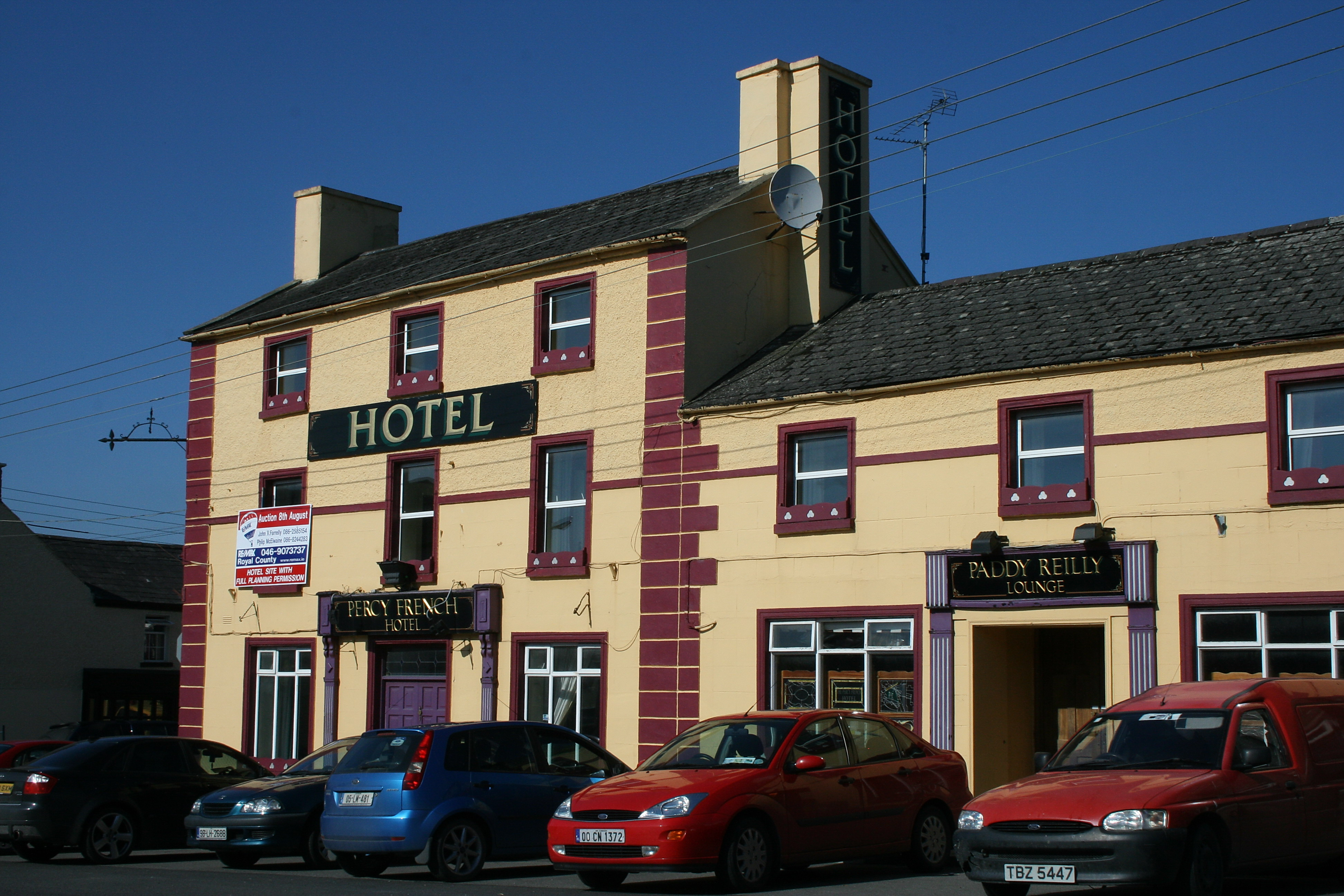
Ballyjamesduff

Name	Population
Arvagh	411
Bailieborough	2,683
Ballinagh	936
Ballyconnell	1,105
Ballyhaise	711
Ballyjamesduff	2,661
Belturbet	1,369
Blacklion	194
Butlersbridge	276
Cavan	10,914
Cootehill	1,853
Killeshandra	388
Kilnaleck	393
Kingscourt	2,499
Lough Gowna	149
Mullagh	1,348
Shercock	588
Swanlinbar	207
Virginia	2,648

a: county town

== See also ==
- List of urban areas in the Republic of Ireland (by population)
- List of towns and villages in the Republic of Ireland (alphabetical)
- List of towns and villages in County Cork
