= R620 road =

R620 road may refer to:

- R620 road (Ireland)
- R620 (South Africa)
