= Loumanagh =

Loumanagh Irish: An Lománach
- townland
- Lamanaugh shown within Ireland
- Coordinates: 52°08′40″N 09°05′31″W
- Country: Ireland
- County: County Cork
- Barony: Duhallow
- Civil parish: Kilmeen

Area
  - Total: 299 ha (739 acres)

Population (2011)
  - Total: 138
- (Loumanagh North 36. Loumanagh South 102)

Loumanagh, or Lamanaugh (Irish: An Lománach meaning "the bare marsh") is a townland situated in the west of Boherbue in north County Cork, Ireland. It is divided between Loumanagh North and Loumanagh South.

== History ==
The road, which divides Loumanagh into north and south, was built in the 17th century to connect Kanturk to Killarney.

Ancient and historical monuments in the townlands of Loumanagh North and Loumanagh South, as listed in the Record of Monuments and Places, include several ringforts, fulacht fiadh, and a burial ground.

== Location ==
Loumanagh is located on a hillock west of Boherbue village towards Knocknagree. The townlands with which it shares borders are Gneeves and Derryleigh to the east, Ruhill to the north, Islandbrack to the west, and to the south is Knocknageeha and Lisheenafeela. Boherbue Presbytery is located on the eastern edge of Lamanaugh.
