= Dripsey Bridge =

Historic bridge in County Cork, Ireland

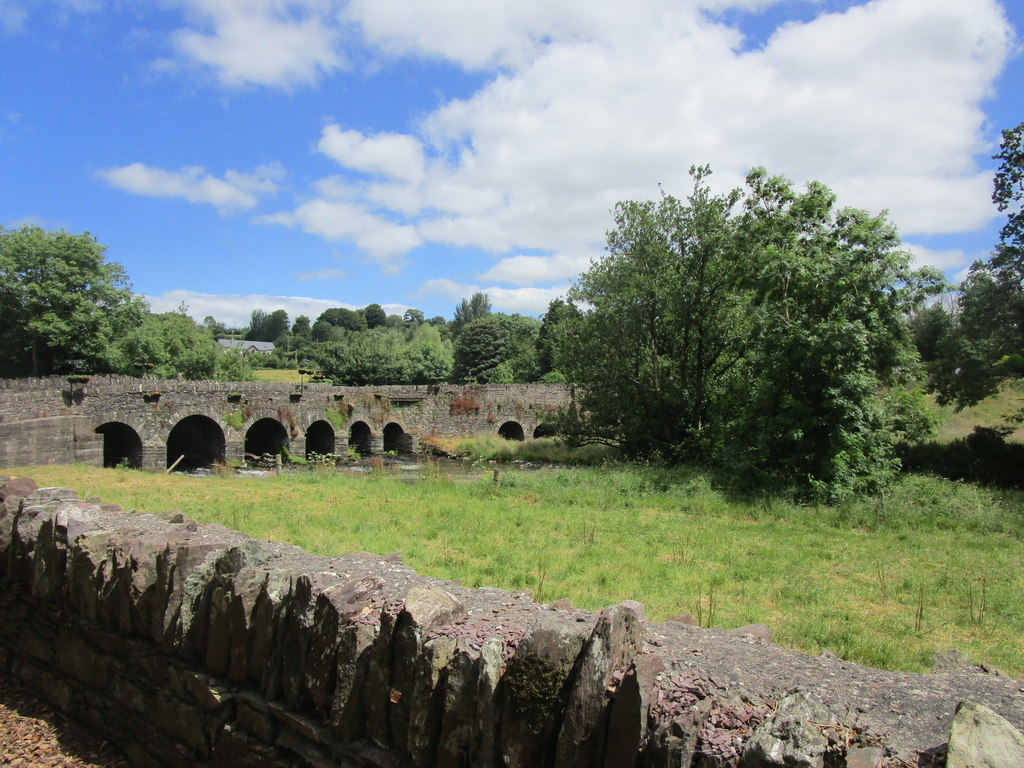
- View of Dripsey Bridge from the West side of the river
- Coordinates: 51°54′55.1″N 8°44′42.8″W
- Carries: Motor vehicles, pedestrians (R618 regional road)
- Crosses: Dripsey River
- Locale: Dripsey, County Cork, Ireland

Characteristics
- Design: Six-arched stone bridge

Dripsey Bridge is a six-arch bridge spanning the Dripsey River in County Cork, Ireland. Although its construction date is unknown, the National Inventory of Architectural Heritage (NIAH) entry for the stone structure suggests that it was "extant" in 1780. It is depicted on both the 1811 Grand Jury map and the 1845 Ordnance Survey maps of the area. It was damaged in 1921 during the Dripsey Ambush that occurred in the Irish War of Independence. The bridge is included in the Record of Protected Structures maintained by Cork County Council.

== Architecture ==
The bridge, originally a small stone structure, has been enlarged and restored over the years. Its current design incorporates six round arches and triangular cutwaters on its piers to manage water flow. It has three additional overflow arches at the eastern end. Pyramidal caps and soldier course copings adorn the parapets. Made of coursed rubble stone, the bridge is traversed by the R618 regional road.

== Folklore ==
Folklore, associated with the bridge, includes a story about a "fairy" in an 1846 article titled "Irish Legends" published in Ainsworth's Magazine. This story, attributed to an unnamed inhabitant of Cork city, recounted that:

"[...] I observed, [standing on battlement of Dripsey bridge], a strange unearthly-looking being dancing to a tune of his own making (such a tune I never heard before or since) [...] I surveyed him quietly for a considerable time, but, at length, to test his nerves, I gave a loud halloo, on hearing which he immediately decamped. My horse arrived home safely that night, and I was found snugly deposited in a ditch at this side of Blarney. That was the only occasion on which I ever saw a fairy".
