= R620 road (Ireland) =

Regional road in Ireland

R620 road
- Bóthar R620
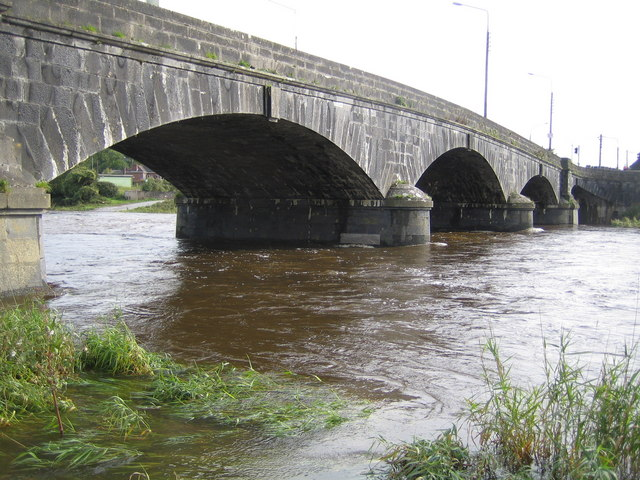
- Mallow Bridge carries the R620 over the River Blackwater

Route information
- Length: 5.1 km (3.2 mi)

Major junctions
- From: R619 at Dromahane, County Cork
- R638 at Gooldshill; N20 at Gooldshill; R619 at Ballydahin, Mallow; Crosses River Blackwater
- To: N72 at Mallow

Location
- Country: Ireland

Highway system
- Roads in Ireland; Motorways; Primary; Secondary; Regional
← R619	→ R621

The R620 road is a regional road in County Cork, Ireland. It travels from the R619 at Dromahane to the N72 at Mallow. The R620 is 5.1 kilometres (3.2 mi) long.
