= R617 road (Ireland) =

Regional road in Ireland

R617 road
- Bóthar R617
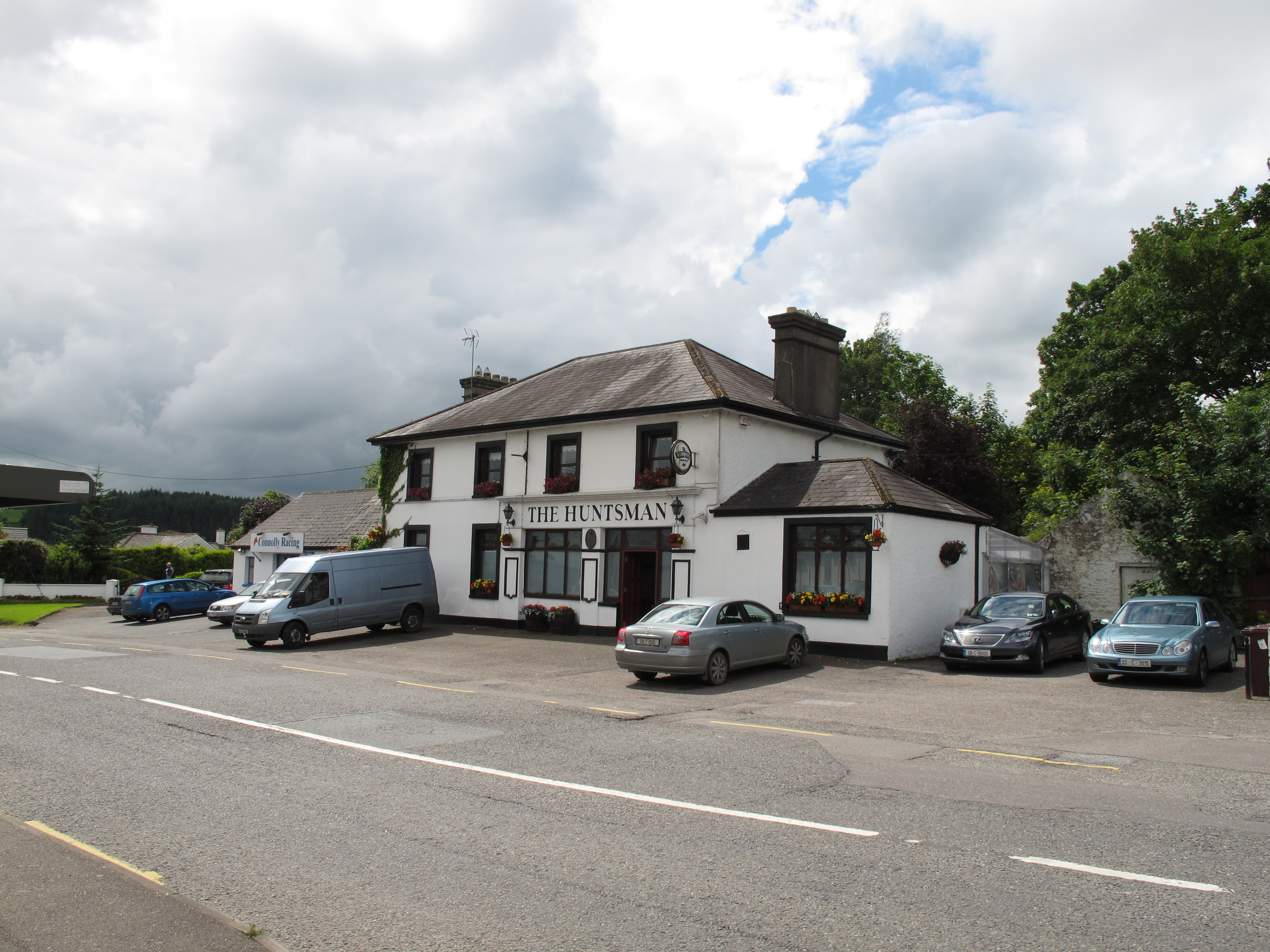
- The Huntsman pub on the R617 in Tower

Route information
- Length: 6.6 km (4.1 mi)

Major junctions
- From: N20 at Clogheenmilcon, County Cork
- To: R579 at Coolflugh

Location
- Country: Ireland

Highway system
- Roads in Ireland; Motorways; Primary; Secondary; Regional
← R616	→ R618

The R617 road is a regional road in County Cork, Ireland. It travels from the N20 road to the R579 road, via Blarney, Tower and Cloghroe. The road is 6.6 kilometres (4.1 mi) long.
