= R576 road (Ireland) =

Road in Ireland

R576 road
- Bóthar R576
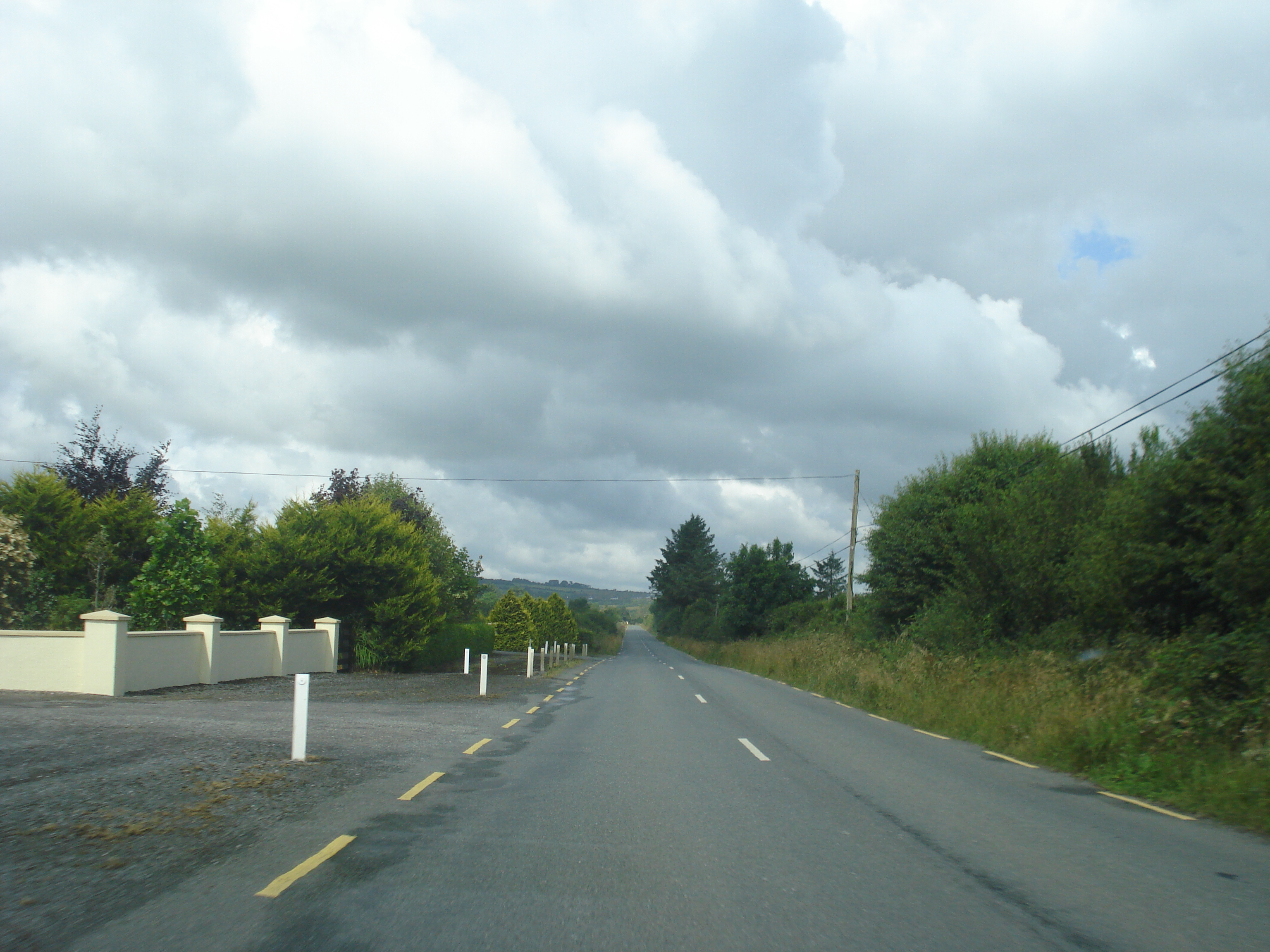
- The R576 near the townland of Inchinapoagh, Brosna

Route information
- Length: 40 km (25 mi)

Location
- Country: Ireland
- Primary destinations: County Kerry; Leaves the N21 at Feale's Bridge; Passes near Brosna and Mountcollins; County Cork; Rockchapel; Newmarket - joins/leaves the R578; Kanturk - (R579; R580); Terminates at the N72

Highway system
- Roads in Ireland; Motorways; Primary; Secondary; Regional

The R576 road is a regional road in Ireland which runs west to east leaving the N21 national primary road in County Kerry at Feale's Bridge and ending at the N72 secondary road east of the town of Kanturk in County Cork.

From Feale's Bridge the route passes the parish of Brosna. Two local roads branch off the R576 to Brosna and Mountcollins, County Limerick respectively. It then enters County Cork passing through the village of Rockchapel. The quality of the road gets very poor from Rockchapel with a series of twisty bends before it passes through the narrow main street in Newmarket where short delays can occur. The route then improves dramatically leaving Newmarket with some stretches of hard shoulder. It then goes through Kanturk with the only roundabout junction on the route before terminating at the N72.

The road is 40 km (25 mi) long.

== See also ==
- Roads in Ireland
- National primary road
- National secondary road
