= Lyre, County Cork =

Village in County Cork, Ireland

Lyre An Ladhar (Irish)
- Village
- Location in Ireland
- Coordinates: 52°04′54.12″N 08°51′32.00″W
- Country: Ireland
- Province: Munster
- County: County Cork

Population (2022)
  - Total: 169
- Time zone: UTC+0 (WET)
  - Summer (DST): UTC-1 (IST (WEST))

Lyre (Irish: An Ladhar) is a townland and small village in the civil parish of Clonmeen, barony of Duhallow, northwest County Cork, Ireland. It is approximately 3 km from the village of Nad. Lyre is within the Cork North-West Dáil constituency.

It is 875 feet (266 metres) above sea level. Some locals claim it to be the third highest village in Ireland, it is the highest in Cork.

== Amenities ==
Lyre has a hall, a national school, a monument for hammer thrower Denis Horgan, a monument to commemorate the turn of the millennium. The local Roman Catholic church is dedicated to St. Joseph and is in the Diocese of Cloyne.

Lyre GAA is the local Gaelic Athletic Association club. It has a football team which competes at levels from under 14 upwards. They compete in the Duhallow league and Ducon Cup Championship, and also the Nevin Cup.

== See also ==
- List of towns and villages in Ireland
