= R622 road (Ireland) =

Road in Ireland

Coordinates: 51.908329°N 8.643911°W

R622 road
- Bóthar R622

Route information
- Length: 1.9 km (1.2 mi)

Major junctions
- From: R579 Cloghroe

- To: R618 Inniscarra

Location
- Country: Ireland

Highway system
- Roads in Ireland; Motorways; Primary; Secondary; Regional

The R622 road is a regional road in Ireland, located in County Cork.
