= Nad, County Cork =

Village in County Cork, Ireland

Nadd Nead an Iolair
- Village
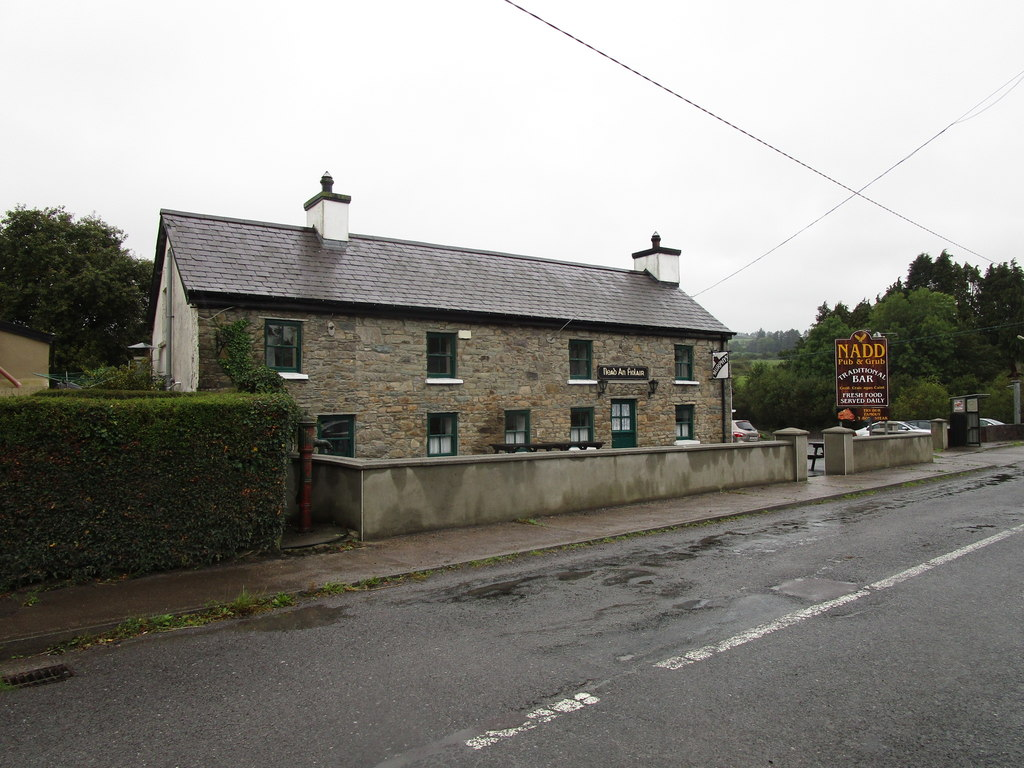
- Eagles Nest pub in Nadd

- Location in Ireland
- Coordinates: 52°04′06″N 08°50′06″W
- Country: Ireland
- Province: Munster
- County: County Cork
- Time zone: UTC+0 (WET)
  - Summer (DST): UTC-1 (IST (WEST))

Nad or Nadd (Irish: Nead an Iolair, meaning 'nest of the eagle') is a small village in the south-east of the barony of Duhallow, in north County Cork, Ireland. It is located on the Kanturk to Cork route (R579) in the foothills of the Boggeragh Mountains, at the confluence of the Nadd and Glen Rivers. The population of the village and surrounding areas is approximately 170 people. The population has been increasing over a number of years, with many young families now living in the area. Nad is located within the Cork North-West and is part of the traditional home of the O'Keeffe clan.

== See also ==
- List of towns and villages in Ireland
