= Maine South =

Maine South Irish: Méin Theas
- Maine South shown within Ireland
- Coordinates: 52°20′39″N 8°48′57″W
- Country: Ireland
- County: Cork
- Barony: Orrery & Kilmore
- Civil parish: Killbolane

Government
  - Council: Cork
  - Local electoral area: Fermoy LEA, Newtown ED

Area
  - Total: 199.5 ha (493 acres)
- Irish grid ref: R544420621707

Maine South (Irish: Méin Theas) is a townland in the Barony of Orrery and Kilmore in County Cork, Ireland. It is contained within the civil parish of Kilbolane, within the Poor law union of Kanturk, and within the electoral division of Newtown, in the local electoral area of Fermoy. It is located on the R515 road, midway between the villages of Milford and Newtownshandrum.
