= R580 road (Ireland) =

Regional road in Ireland

R580 road
- Bóthar R580

Route information
- Length: 18.8 km (11.7 mi)

Major junctions
- From: R576 at Greenane Street Kanturk, County Cork
- To: N20 at Main Street, Buttevant, County Cork

Location
- Country: Ireland

Highway system
- Roads in Ireland; Motorways; Primary; Secondary; Regional
| ← R579 | → R581 |

The R580 road is a regional road in County Cork, Ireland. It travels from the R576 road at Kanturk to the N20 at Buttevant. The road is 18.8 kilometres (11.7 mi) long.
