= Glantane =

Village in County Cork, Ireland

Glantane An Gleanntán
- Village
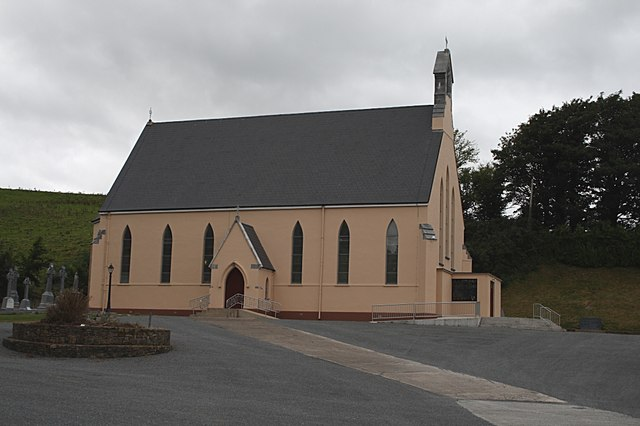
- Glantane Church

- Location in Ireland
- Coordinates: 52°5′59″N 8°45′8″W
- Country: Ireland
- Province: Munster
- County: County Cork
- Time zone: UTC+0 (WET)
  - Summer (DST): UTC-1 (IST (WEST))

Glantane (Irish: An Gleanntán) is a village located 10 km (6.2 mi) south west of the town of Mallow, County Cork, Ireland on the L1212 local road. Glantane is within the Cork North-West Dáil constituency.

== Transportation ==
=== Road ===
Glantane is situated approximately 10 km from Mallow on the L1212 road. The village is 3.5 km from the N72 national secondary road.

=== Rail ===
The nearest railway station is Mallow railway station. The station is the terminus for the Mallow-Tralee line, while it is also a key station on the Dublin-Cork railway line and as part of Cork Suburban Rail. Until 1967, the nearest railway station to Glantane was located 3.5 km away in Lombardstown.

== Facilities ==
St. John's Roman Catholic Church holds regular masses. The village also has a pub (the Local), a Garda station, a community centre and the sports grounds of Kilshannig GAA.

== Education ==
The village is served by the local primary school, Glantane National School, which was opened in 1953. At that time, there were two schools in the building: Glantane Girls' N.S and Glantane Boys' N.S. In 1967 the two schools were amalgamated.

== Sport ==
Glantane, along with Dromahane, Lombardstown and Bweeng, is represented in Gaelic games by the Kilshannig club. The club's headquarters are O'Connell Park in Glantane. The club's facilities include three playing fields and a GAA complex featuring a gym, an indoor playing area and meeting rooms.

== See also ==
- List of towns and villages in Ireland
