= Castlemagner =

Village in County Cork, Ireland

Castlemagner Caisleán an Mhaignéaraigh
- Village
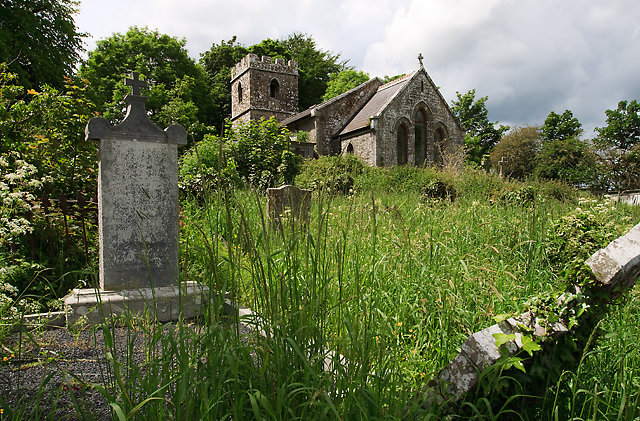
- Ruined church and St Brigid's cemetery in Castlemagner townland

- Location in Ireland
- Coordinates: 52°9′59″N 8°49′37″W
- Country: Ireland
- Province: Munster
- County: County Cork

Population (2022)
  - Total: 354
- Time zone: UTC+0 (WET)
  - Summer (DST): UTC-1 (IST (WEST))

Castlemagner (Irish: Caisleán an Mhaignéaraigh) is a village, townland and civil parish in the Duhallow area of north-west County Cork, Ireland. Castlemagner is within the Cork North-West Dáil constituency.

== History ==
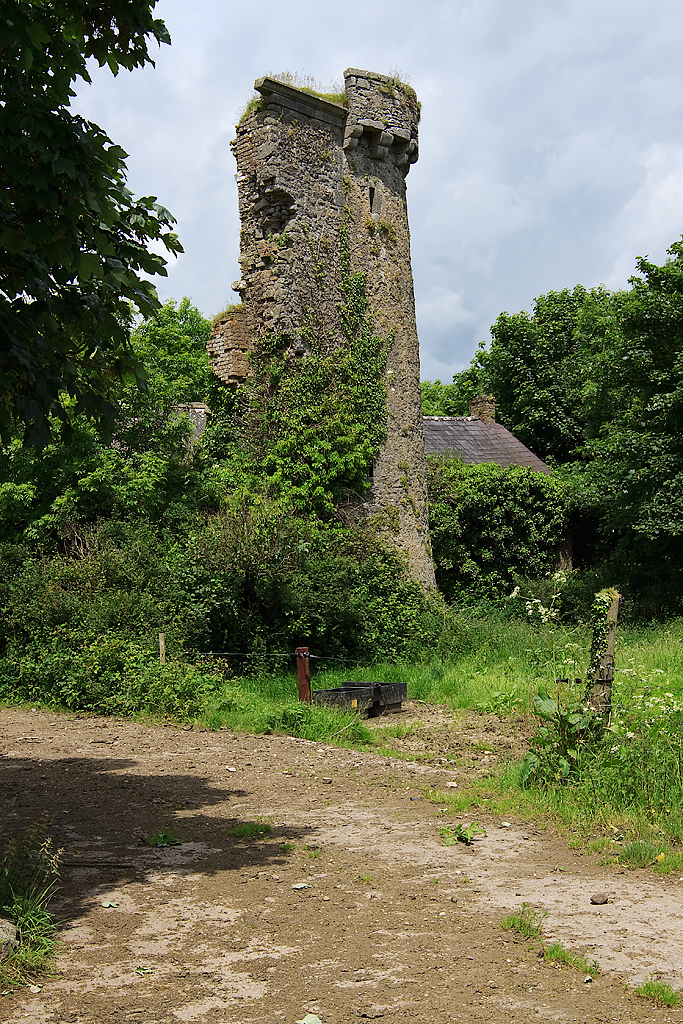
The ruined remains of Castle Magner's stair turret

The area takes its name from the eponymous Castle Magner, a Norman-era tower house which is located approximately 500 metres (1,600 ft) east of the village itself on the eastern boundary of Castlemagner townland. Owned by a Richard Magner during the Irish Rebellion of 1641, the tower house was largely destroyed in the late 16th century. The lands surrounding Castle Magner were confiscated during the Cromwellian conquest of Ireland. The castle is largely in ruin, though the stair turret and parts of the surrounding bawn wall remain.

Close to the castle is Saint Bridget's Church, a disused but largely extant Church of Ireland church. While the church itself was built in the early 19th century, the surrounding cemetery contains gravestones which are dated from the 18th century and earlier.

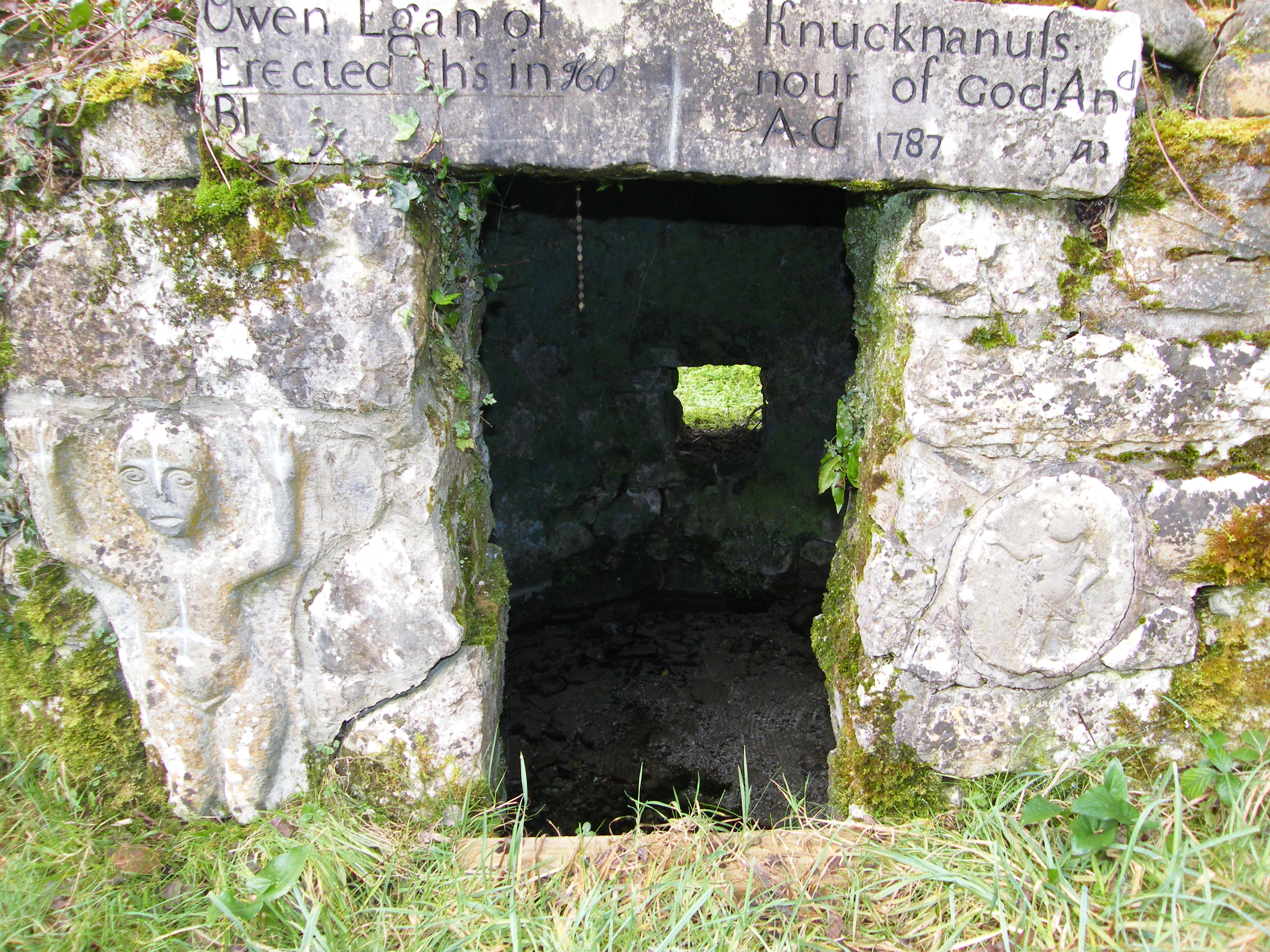
Holy well entrance, with 1789 inscription and carved figures

A nearby holy well, also dedicated to Saint Bridget, is covered by a carved stone surround including an 18th-century inscription and a carving, sometimes claimed to be a Sheela na gig.

Castlemagner's Roman Catholic church, which is dedicated to Saint Mary and was built c.1880, is located within the village itself. There is a shrine to Edel Quinn, a local lay missionary, within the church grounds.

== Amenities ==
Castlemagner has a community centre building, a pub (the Castle Bar, known locally as Geoff's). The local Gaelic Athletic Association club, Castlemagner GAA, fields Gaelic football and hurling teams in the Duhallow division. The club won the Cork Junior B Hurling Championship in 2012.
