= R579 road (Ireland) =

Regional road in Ireland

R579 road
- Bóthar R579
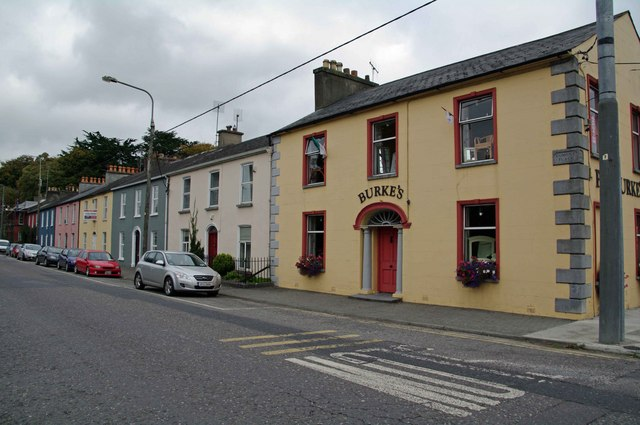
- R579 in Kanturk

Route information
- Length: 69.7 km (43.3 mi)

Major junctions
- From: R515 at Killilagh Cross, County Limerick
- Enter County Cork; R578 at Glanycummane Lower; R576 at O'Brien Street, Kanturk; N72 at Ballymaquirk; Cross River Blackwater; R619 at Ballycunningham; R617 at Coolflugh
- To: R618 at Leemount Cross, County Cork

Location
- Country: Ireland

Highway system
- Roads in Ireland; Motorways; Primary; Secondary; Regional
← R578	→ R580

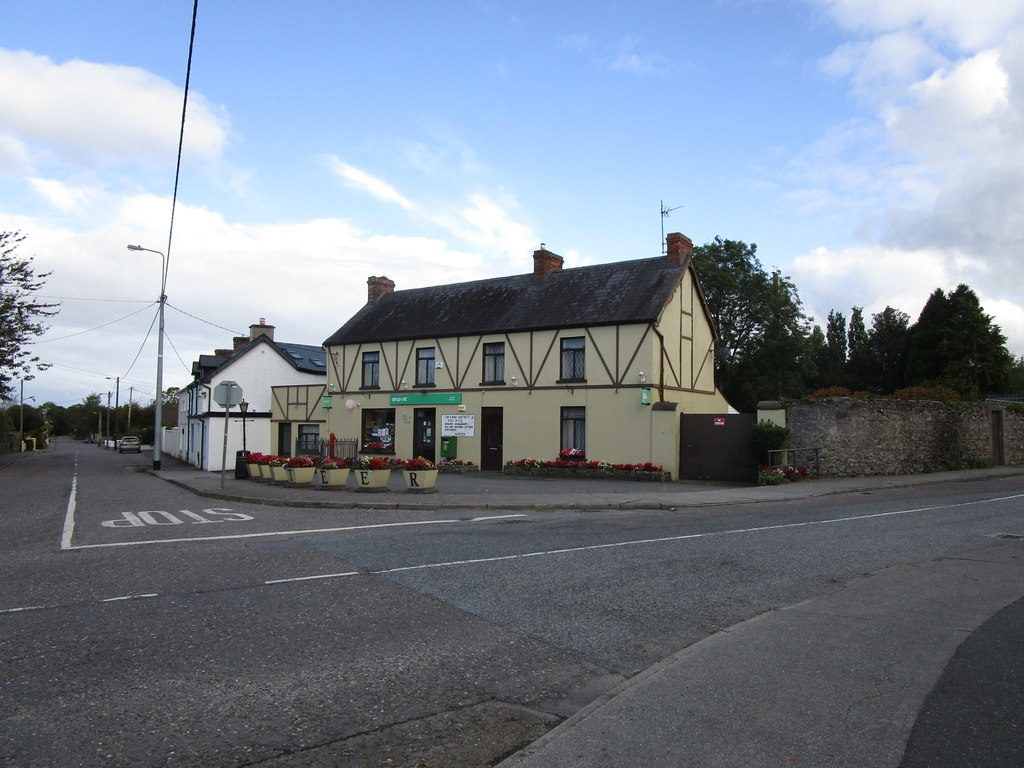
Banteer on the R579

The R579 road is a regional road in Ireland. It travels from the R515 road at Broadford, County Limerick to the R618 on the outskirts of Cork, via the town of Kanturk and the villages of Banteer and Cloghroe. North of Kanturk, the road mostly follows the course of the River Allow. The road is 69.7 kilometres (43.3 mi) long.
