= Cloghroe =

Village in County Cork, Munster, Ireland

Cloghroe Cloch Reo
- Village
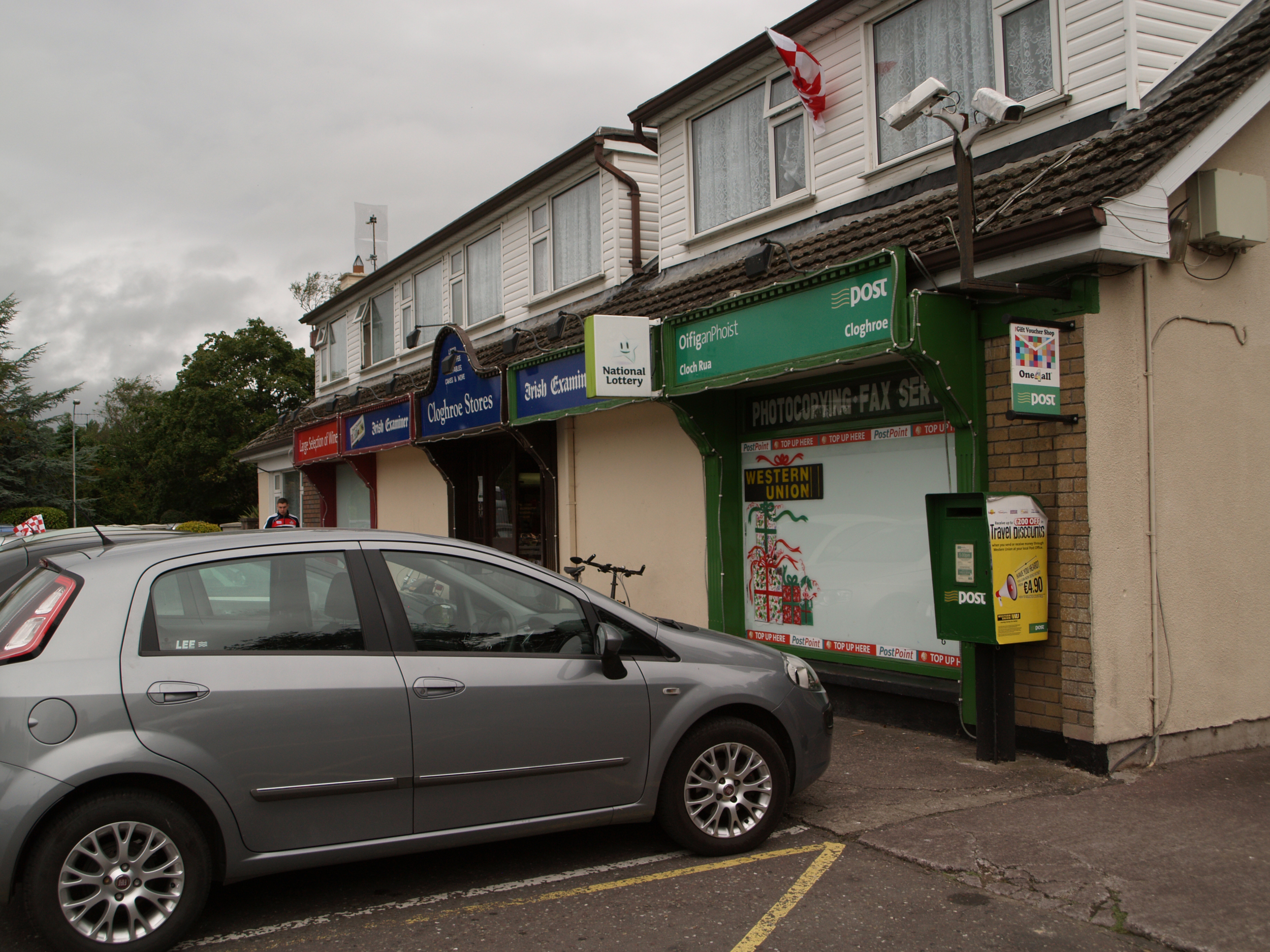
- Post office and village shops

- Location in Ireland
- Coordinates: 51°55′29″N 8°38′56″W
- Country: Ireland
- Province: Munster
- County: County Cork
- Barony: Barretts
- Parish: Inniscarra
- Time zone: UTC+0 (WET)
  - Summer (DST): UTC-1 (IST (WEST))

Cloghroe (Irish: Cloch Reo) is a village and townland on the R579 (Cork to Banteer) road in County Cork, Ireland. It is 7 miles (11 km) northwest of Cork, close to Inniscarra and Tower (via the R617 road). The Sheep River runs to the rear of the local pub Blairs Inn on the western side. The Wayside Inn is at the eastern end of the village. Cloghroe village is a linear settlement consisting of one row of houses on each side of the road.

The origin of the name Cloghroe is from the Irish cloc rua meaning "red stone", which is common in the natural geography of the land.

Cloghroe House is situated en route to the Inniscarra Community Centre. It was built in the middle of the 18th century and became the home of Elizabeth, second daughter of Joseph Capel, (by Elizabeth M'Cartie, only daughter of Dennis M'Cartie of Castle Ballea, before she married Col Sir Thomas Judkin-FitzGerald 1st Bt of Lisheen & infamous "flogging FitzGerald" 1798 High Sheriff of Tipperary) descended inherited residence of Sir Joseph Capel Judkin-Fitzgerald 4th Bt of Lisheen who died in 1917.

== See also ==
- List of towns and villages in Ireland
