= R618 road (Ireland) =

Road in Ireland

R618 road
- Bóthar R618
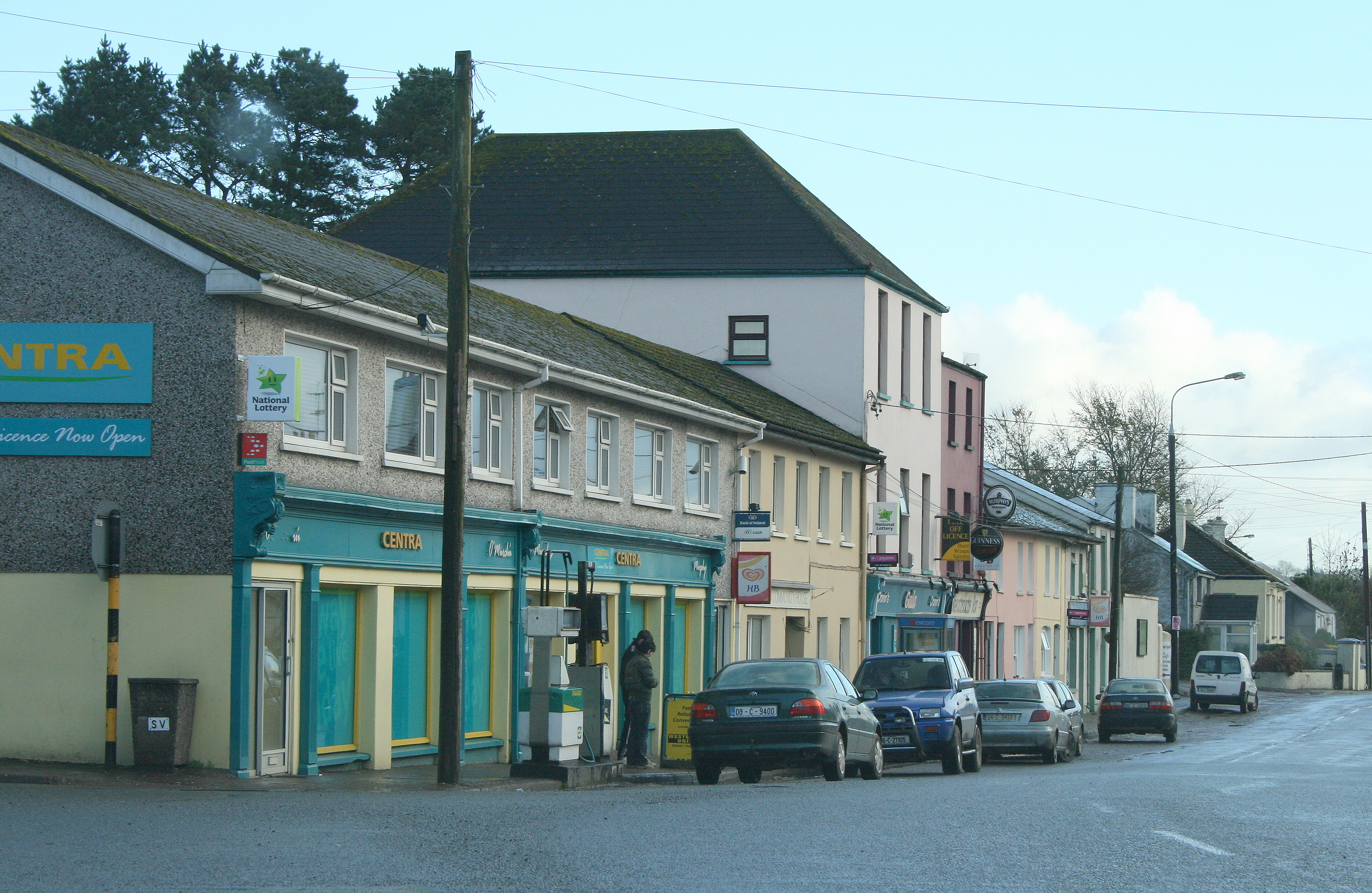
- Cork Road, Coachford, on the R618

Route information
- Length: 34.3 km (21.3 mi)

Location
- Country: Ireland
- Primary destinations: County Cork; Carrigaphooca - leaves the N22; Macroom - (R584); Carrigadrohid; Coachford - (R619); Dripsey; (R622); (R579); Terminates at the N22 west of Cork

Highway system
- Roads in Ireland; Motorways; Primary; Secondary; Regional

The R618 road is a regional road in Ireland which runs west-east from the N22 bypass in Carrigaphooca, west of Macroom along the northern banks of the River Lee to rejoin the N22 at Carrigrohane near Cork City. The road passes through Carrigadrohid, Coachford and Dripsey en route. The point where the R618 leaves the N22 on the outskirts of Cork is known as Kerry Pike. The road was once part of the main route between Cork and Kerry.

The road is 28 km (17 mi) long.

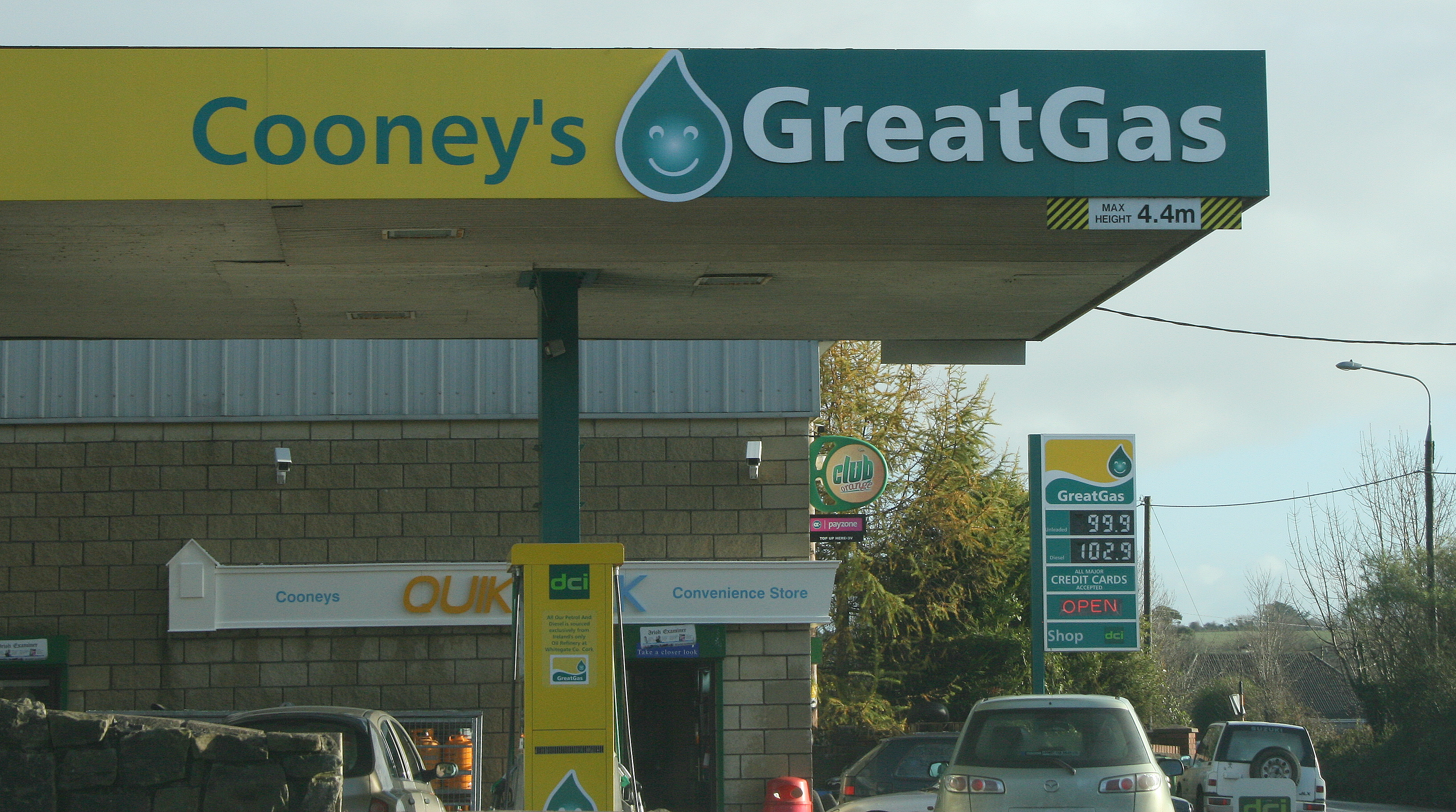
Pit stop on the R618

== See also ==
- Roads in Ireland
- National primary road
- National secondary road
