= R619 road (Ireland) =

Road in Ireland

R619 road
- Bóthar R619
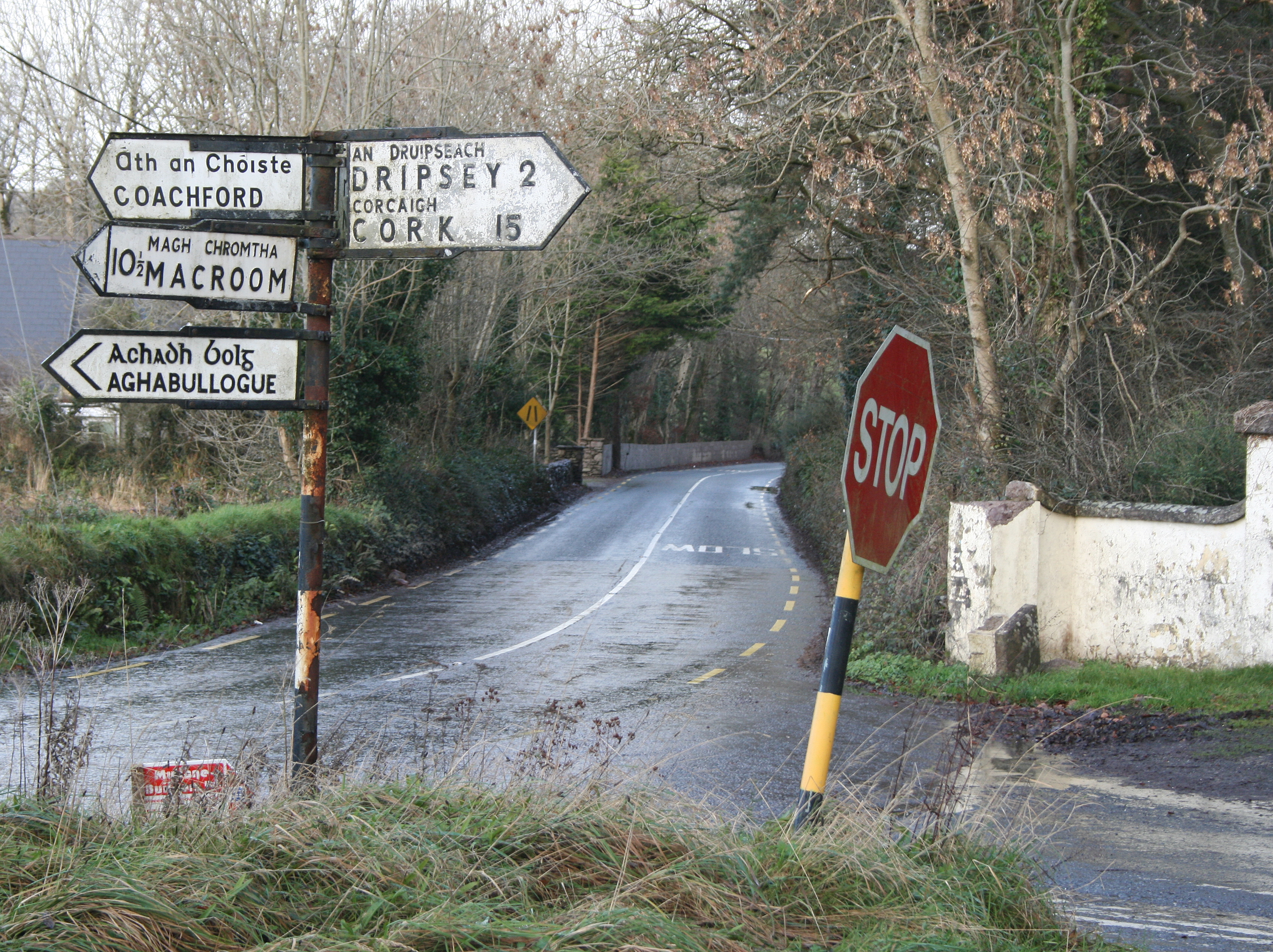
- R619 near Dripsey

Route information
- Length: 42 km (26 mi)

Location
- Country: Ireland
- Primary destinations: County Cork; Mallow - leaves the N72 at junction with the R620; (R621); Crosses the Mallow - Killarney railway line; Drommahane - (R620); Crean's Cross Roads - (R579); Coachford - (R618); Dripsey; Crosses the River Lee; Terminates at Farnanes on the N22 between Cork and Macroom

Highway system
- Roads in Ireland; Motorways; Primary; Secondary; Regional

The R619 road is a regional road in Ireland which runs north-south from the N73 in Mallow to Farnanes on the N22 between Macroom and Cork City. It crosses the River Lee south of Coachford.

The R619 is entirely in County Cork. The road is 42 km (26 mi) long.

The road is often affected by poor weather during winter, for example in January 2025 there was snow accumulation and poor conditions on the road.
