= Duhallow =

Barony in County Cork, Ireland

Duhallow Dúiche Ealla
- Barony
- Location in Ireland
- Coordinates: 52°13′27″N 8°58′15″W
- Country: Ireland
- Province: Munster
- County: Cork
- Time zone: UTC+0 (WET)
  - Summer (DST): UTC-1 (IST (WEST))

Duhallow (Irish: Dúiche Ealla) is a barony located in the north-western part of County Cork, Ireland.

== Legal context ==
Baronies were created after the Norman invasion of Ireland as divisions of Irish counties and used in the administration of justice and the raising of revenue. While Baronies have been administratively obsolete since 1898, they continue to be used in some areas, such as in planning permissions. In some cases, a barony may correspond to an earlier Gaelic túath which had submitted to the Crown.

== Location and settlements ==
Duhallow is located on the borders of counties Kerry and Limerick, and is bounded on the south by the Boggeragh Mountains. The Blackwater River flows southward from Ballydesmond to Rathmore before turning eastward past Millstreet, Kanturk, and Banteer, eventually flowing to the sea at Youghal. The main towns in Duhallow are Newmarket, Kanturk, and Millstreet, with smaller villages such as Ballydesmond, Banteer, Lyre, Kilcorney, Nadd, Boherbue, Castlemagner, Cullen, Kiskeam, Kilbrin, Knocknagree, Lismire, Meelin, Freemount, Rockchapel and Rathcoole.

== Culture ==
Duhallow GAA is the local division for the Gaelic Athletic Association clubs of Duhallow. The top football and hurling competitions in the division are the Duhallow Junior A Football Championship and the Duhallow Junior A Hurling Championship.

Duhallow is mentioned in the Irish folk song Thady Quill.

== See also ==
- List of civil parishes of County Cork
- List of townlands of the barony of Duhallow in County Cork
