= Cullen, County Cork =

Village in County Cork, Ireland

Cullen Cuillinn
- Village
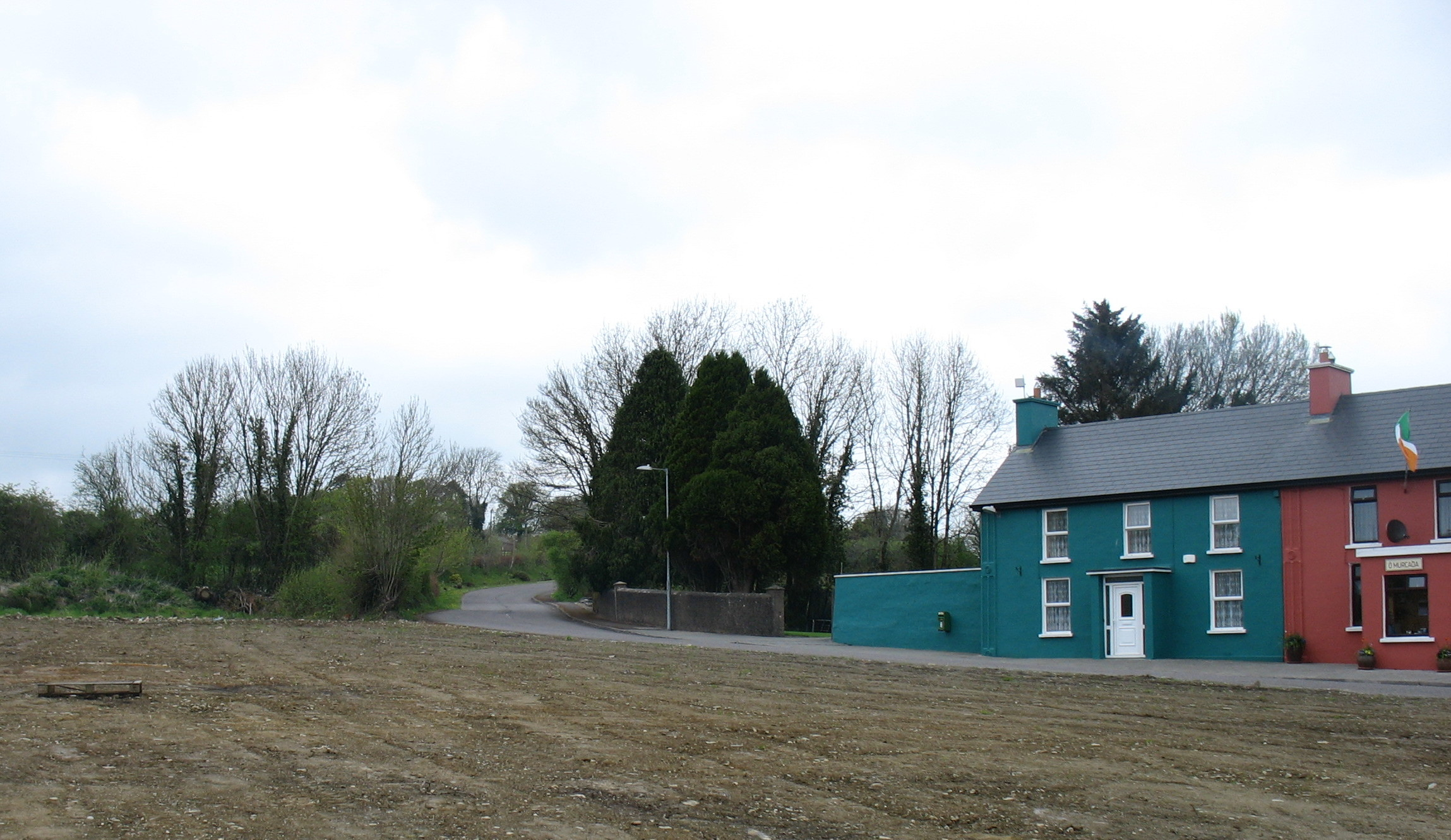
- Houses in Cullen

- Location in Ireland
- Coordinates: 52°06′54″N 09°07′22″W
- Country: Ireland
- Province: Munster
- County: County Cork
- Time zone: UTC+0 (WET)
  - Summer (DST): UTC-1 (IST (WEST))
- Area code: 029
- Irish grid reference: W232960

Cullen (Irish: Cuillinn) is a small village and civil parish in County Cork, Ireland, situated north west of Millstreet town, in the barony of Duhallow. It is about four miles east of the Kerry border and Rathmore village. St. Laitiaran's Well can be found in the area. Cullen is within the Dáil constituency of Cork North-West.

The local Gaelic Athletic Association club, Cullen GAA, fields Gaelic football teams in the Duhallow divisional competitions. The former Minister for Education, Batt O'Keeffe, and poet and academic Bernard O'Donoghue are from the area.

The Cullen Pipe Band, founded in the 1940s and based in the village, has participated in national and international competitions.

== See also ==
- List of towns and villages in Ireland
