= Dromahane =

Village in County Cork, Ireland

Dromahane Drom Átháin
- Village
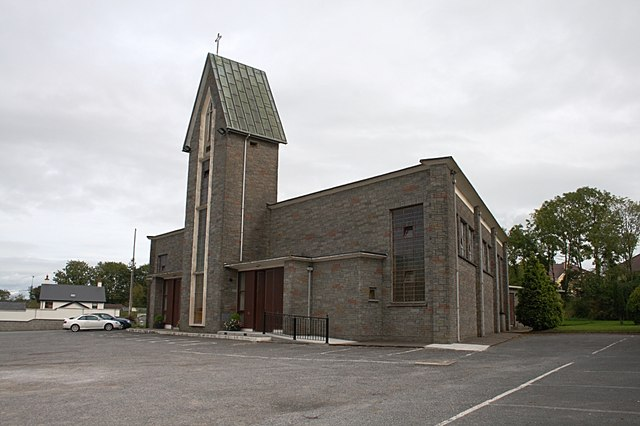
- St Peter's Church

- Location in Ireland
- Coordinates: 52°6′19″N 8°41′27″W
- Country: Ireland
- Province: Munster
- County: County Cork

Population (2022)
  - Total: 947
- Time zone: UTC+0 (WET)
  - Summer (DST): UTC-1 (IST (WEST))

Dromahane (Irish: Drom Átháin) is a village located 5 km (3 mi) south west of the town of Mallow, County Cork, Ireland on the R619 road. Centred on a main crossroads, the village overlooks the Blackwater Valley. As of the 2022 census, Dromahane had a population of 947 people.

Dromahane is in the civil parish of Kilshannig. There are several ringforts in the area and Dromaneen Castle is nearby. St Peter's Church was finished in 1904 and renovated in 1956.

== Transport ==
By road, the Dromahane junction is 2 miles (3.2 km) south of Mallow on the N20. Alternate routes from Mallow include taking the "Navigation Road" or the "Old Cork Road".

Although the main rail line between Mallow and Kerry passes just to the north of the village, the nearest railway station is Mallow railway station about 6 km away.

== Economy ==
South of Dromahane is the Dromore "Point to Point" race track, which draws crowds from all over Munster to the village for the horse racing event.

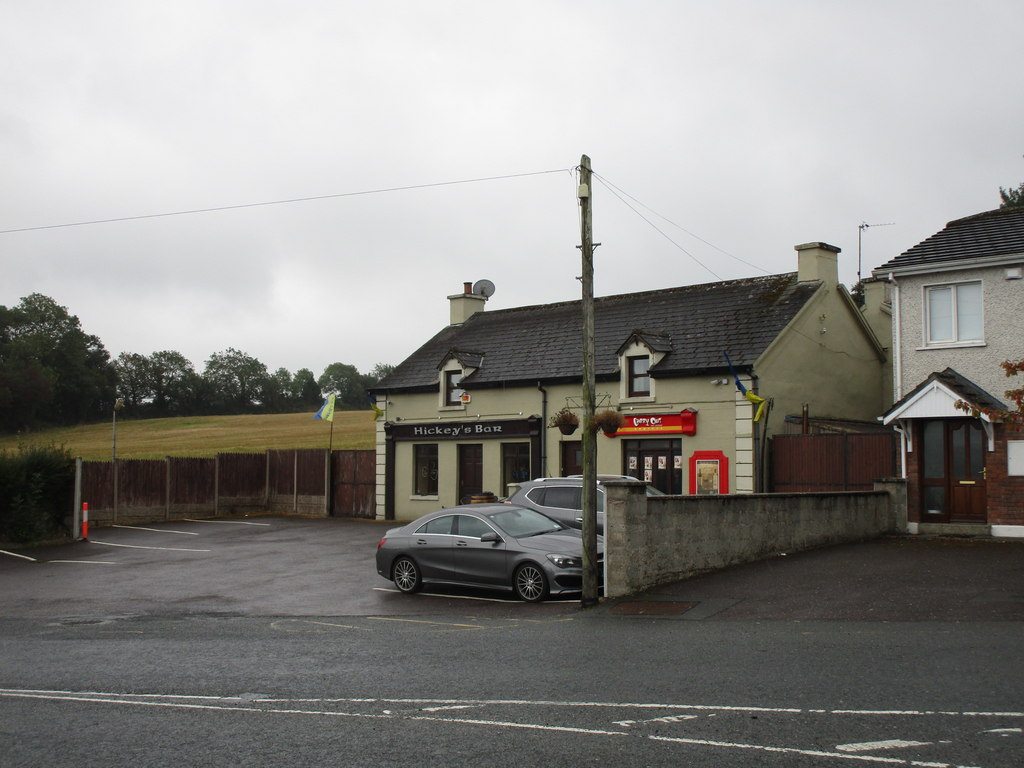
Pub and shop in Dromahane

Businesses located in the village include a pub, shop, nursing home, a joinery, printers, electricians, hauliers, plumbers, plant hire, ironmonger and agri-contractor.

== Amenities ==
The village has a large school primary (national) school. The nearest secondary schools are in Mallow town.

The village also has St Peter's Roman Catholic church.

The local underage GAA club is called Thomas Russell's and they have their grounds in the village of Glantane, located 3 miles (4.8 km) west of Dromahane. There is also a tennis club in the area.

== People ==
Thomas Russell, sometimes referred to as "the man from God knows where", was born in the village on 21 November 1767. He was a founding member of the United Irishmen and was hanged in 1803 in Downpatrick gaol for his involvement in uprisings against the British.

An old graveyard (Kilshannig) is located north of the village and this is where Daniel O'Connell's maternal ancestors are buried. Also, the parents of Thomas Croke, after whom Croke Park is named, are buried here.

In his book Mo Sgéal Féin, Canon Peter O'Leary (Peadar Ua Laoghaire) talks about Dromahane in a discussion of his ancestry. He says his mother's father, Conor O'Leary, married Nell Hickey of Dromathane (an alternate spelling). From the translation by Cyril Ó Céirnín published in 1987:

"They had a son, Conor was his name, a very wise, very prudent man. He married one of the Hickeys, a daughter of Tadhg 'ach Aindriais, who was living over at Dromathane, on the banks of the Blackwater; the daughter was called Neill ni Taidhg. They had the full of the house of children. Siobhán was the name of one of the daughters."

== See also ==
- List of towns and villages in Ireland
