= Lombardstown =

Village in County Cork, Ireland

Lombardstown Baile Lombaird
- Village
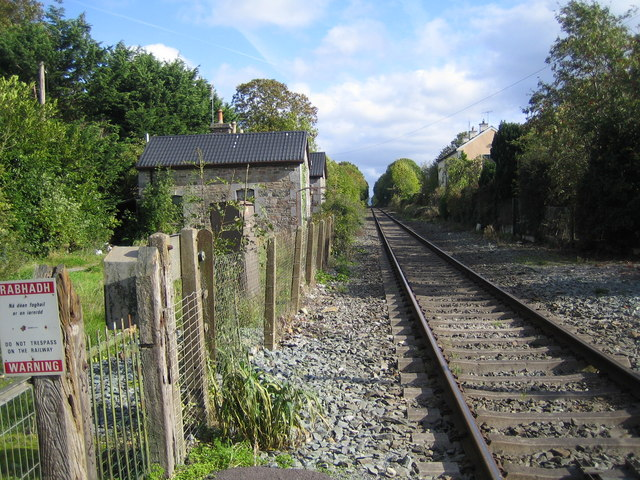
- Railway line to Mallow at Lombardstown

- Location in Ireland
- Coordinates: 52°07′07″N 08°46′55″W
- Country: Ireland
- Province: Munster
- County: County Cork
- Time zone: UTC+0 (WET)
  - Summer (DST): UTC-1 (IST (WEST))

Lombardstown (Irish: Baile Lombaird) is a village 9 kilometres (6 mi) west of the town of Mallow in County Cork, Ireland. It takes its name from the Lombard family who came to Ireland from Lombardy in Northern Italy in the Middle Ages and became rich and prominent, with branches of the family in Waterford and Cork. Lombardstown is within the Dáil constituency of Cork North-West.

It has a co-op, a post office and is the site of a Dairygold Agri Business plant.

== Notable people ==
From 1912 the Irish tenor, John McCormack, spent summers in the area after he purchased a small cottage outside the village. In 1918, McCormack sold this cottage due to his singing commitments in the US.

== See also ==
- List of towns and villages in Ireland
