= Boherbue =

Village in County Cork, Ireland

Boherbue An Bóthar Buí
- Village
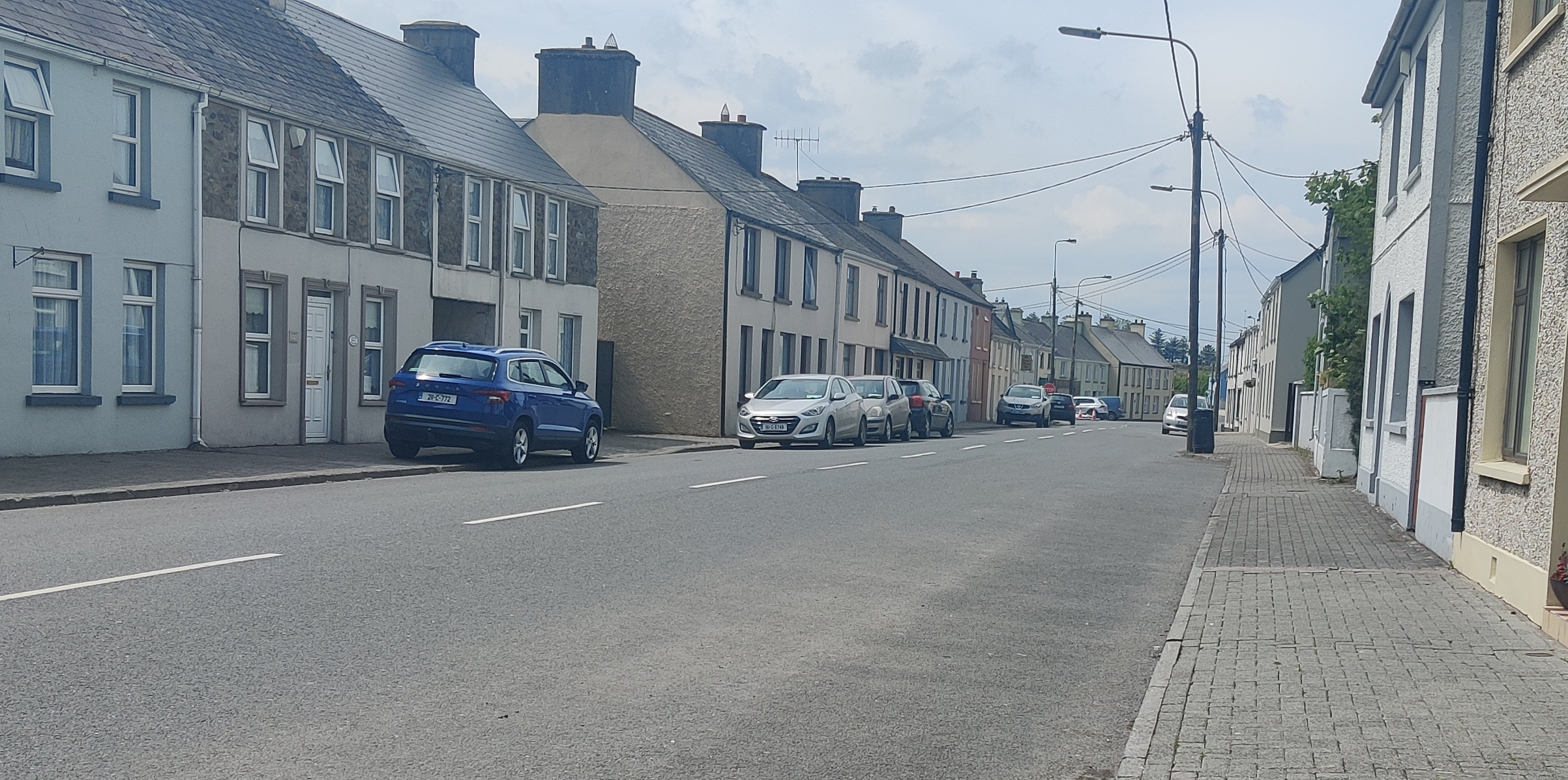
- Main Street
- Nickname: Boher
- Location in Ireland
- Coordinates: 52°09′N 9°04′W
- Country: Ireland
- Province: Munster
- County: County Cork
- District: Millstreet
- Elevation: 800 ft (240 m)

Population (2022)
  - Total: 442
- Time zone: UTC+0 (WET)
  - Summer (DST): UTC-1 (IST (WEST))

Boherbue (post office spelling) or Boherboy (Ordnance Survey spelling) (Irish: An Bóthar Buí, meaning 'the yellow road') is a village in north-west County Cork, Ireland. The village is in the civil parish of Kilmeen in the Barony of Duhallow, and spans the townlands of Gneeves, Laharan and Derrynatubbrid. Boherbue is within the Cork North-West Dáil constituency.

== History ==
While a date for the first permanent settlement in the area is not known, it has been suggested that the first inhabitants of the area were nomadic due to the number of 'forts and bailes' recorded in the area. Other ancient monuments in the area, as listed in the Record of Monuments and Places, include several ringforts and fulacht fiadh.

A permanent settlement was described as early as 1655 in William Petty’s map of County Cork. In the 17th century the wider areas of Pobal Uí Chaoimh and Sliabh Luachra were being opened up by the construction of roadways, which facilitated the movement of cattle and general economic growth. During this time a roadway from Kanturk to Killarney was constructed which passed through present day Boherbue.

Map showing the area around the parish of Boherbue from the Down Survey of Ireland circa 1656

== Origin of name ==
Several theories exist as to how the area came to be known as Bóthar Buí. Bóthar Buí literally translated from Irish means ‘yellow road’, and many maintain that the name comes from the yellow mud that used to come to the surface of the road in times of rain. Another theory suggests that the name comes from the pagan god or chief Druid Baoí, who is said to have lived in the area. Yet another explanation is that name originates from the abundant yellow gorse bushes (known locally as ‘furze’) that grow in the area.

== Transport and economy ==
Boherbue lies on the R577 road, linking Tralee and Mallow. The nearest airport is Kerry Airport (37 km away).

The closest rail link to Boherbue is Millstreet (12 km) and Banteer (15 km) train stations, Mallow train station (32 km away) is popular in the area because of the frequent Cork-Dublin services from there.

Employers in the area include Ingredients Solutions (a cheese factory).

== Education ==
Boherbue Educare (a pre-school and creche) is located in the townland of Gneeves.

At primary level, local children are educated at Boherbue National School which is on the Knocknagree road (L1108). The local second-level school is Boherbue Comprehensive School which lies to the east of the village.

== Religion ==
The original parish church was situated evidently where Kilmeen graveyard is today. The present parish church is situated in the east end of the village. It is a modern building, erected in 1969 by local contractor Christy Feehan and blessed and opened by the then Bishop of Kerry, Dr Moynihan, on 29 April 1969.

== Sport ==
Boherbue's main sport is Gaelic Football represented by Boherbue GAA club with the football field situated in Gneeves at the western end of the village on the Knocknagree road. (L1108)

As of 2018 Boherbue juvenile footballers have amalgamated with Knocknagree to form BK Plunketts, the name Plunkett is of honour of the founder of the Co-operative movement Horace Plunkett.

Boherbue is also represented in Ladies Football, Boherbue LFC used to represent the area until they amalgamated with the Ballydesmond and Kiskeam club Araglin Desmonds, therefore renaming Araglin Desmonds Buí to represent Boherbue.

Boherbue National School and Boherbue Comprehensive School both compete in school championships in football and hurling.

Handball is also played in Boherbue.

== Notable people ==
- Daniel Buckley, survivor of the sinking of the RMS Titanic and United States Army soldier in World War I
